= List of airports by IATA code: F =

The DST column shows the months in which Daylight Saving Time, a.k.a. Summer Time, begins and ends. A blank DST box usually indicates that the location stays on Standard Time all year, although in some cases the location stays on Summer Time all year. If a location is currently on DST, add one hour to the time in the Time column.

IATA	ICAO	Airport name	Location served	Time	DST
-FA-
FAA	GUFH	Faranah Airport	Faranah, Guinea	UTC±00:00	
FAB	EGLF	Farnborough Airport	Farnborough, England, United Kingdom	UTC±00:00	Mar-Oct
FAC	NTKF	Faaite Airport	Faaite, Tuamotus, French Polynesia	UTC−10:00	
FAE	EKVG	Vágar Airport	Vágar, Faroe Islands	UTC±00:00	Mar-Oct
FAF	KFAF	Felker Army Airfield	Fort Eustis, Virginia, United States	UTC−05:00	Mar-Nov
FAG	BIFM	Fagurhólsmýri Airport	Fagurhólsmýri, Iceland	UTC±00:00	
FAH	OAFR	Farah Airport	Farah, Afghanistan	UTC+04:30	
FAI	PAFA	Fairbanks International Airport	Fairbanks, Alaska, United States	UTC−09:00	Mar-Nov
FAJ	TJFA	Diego Jiménez Torres Airport (FAA: X95)	Fajardo, Puerto Rico, United States	UTC−04:00	
FAK		False Island Seaplane Base (FAA: 2Z6)	False Island, Alaska, United States	UTC−09:00	Mar-Nov
FAM	KFAM	Farmington Regional Airport	Farmington, Missouri, United States	UTC−06:00	Mar-Nov
FAO	LPFR	Faro Airport	Faro, Portugal	UTC±00:00	Mar-Oct
FAQ	AYFR	Frieda River Airport	Frieda River, Papua New Guinea	UTC+10:00	
FAR	KFAR	Hector International Airport	Fargo, North Dakota, United States	UTC−06:00	Mar-Nov
FAS	BIFF	Fáskrúðsfjörður Airport	Fáskrúðsfjörður, Iceland	UTC±00:00	
FAT	KFAT	Fresno Yosemite International Airport	Fresno, California, United States	UTC−08:00	Mar-Nov
FAU	OOFD	Fahud Airport	Fahud, Oman	UTC+04:00	
FAV	NTGF	Fakarava Airport	Fakarava, Tuamotus, French Polynesia	UTC−10:00	
FAY	KFAY	Fayetteville Regional Airport (Grannis Field)	Fayetteville, North Carolina, United States	UTC−05:00	Mar-Nov
FAZ	OISF	Fasa Airport	Fasa, Iran	UTC+03:30	Mar-Sep
-FB-
FBA	SWOB	Fonte Boa Airport	Fonte Boa, Amazonas, Brazil	UTC−05:00	
FBD	OAFZ	Fayzabad Airport	Fayzabad, Afghanistan	UTC+04:30	
FBE	SSFB	Francisco Beltrão Airport (Paulo Abdala Airport)	Francisco Beltrão, Paraná, Brazil	UTC−03:00	
FBG	KFBG	Simmons Army Airfield	Fort Bragg, North Carolina, United States	UTC−05:00	Mar-Nov
FBK	PAFB	Ladd Army Airfield	Fairbanks, Alaska, United States	UTC−09:00	Mar-Nov
FBL	KFBL	Faribault Municipal Airport	Faribault, Minnesota, United States	UTC−06:00	Mar-Nov
FBM	FZQA	Lubumbashi International Airport	Lubumbashi, Democratic Republic of the Congo	UTC+02:00	
FBR	KFBR	Fort Bridger Airport	Fort Bridger, Wyoming, United States	UTC−07:00	Mar-Nov
FBS		Friday Harbor Seaplane Base (FAA: W33)	Friday Harbor, Washington, United States	UTC−08:00	Mar-Nov
FBY	KFBY	Fairbury Municipal Airport	Fairbury, Nebraska, United States	UTC−06:00	Mar-Nov
-FC-
FCA	KGPI	Glacier Park International Airport (FAA: GPI)	Kalispell, Montana, United States	UTC−07:00	Mar-Nov
FCB	FAFB	Ficksburg Airport	Ficksburg, South Africa	UTC+02:00	
FCH	KFCH	Fresno Chandler Executive Airport	Fresno, California, United States	UTC−08:00	Mar-Nov
FCM	KFCM	Flying Cloud Airport	Eden Prairie, Minnesota, United States	UTC−06:00	Mar-Nov
FCN	ETMN	Sea-Airport Cuxhaven/Nordholz	Cuxhaven, Lower Saxony, Germany	UTC+01:00	Mar-Oct
FCO	LIRF	Leonardo da Vinci–Fiumicino Airport	Rome, Lazio, Italy	UTC+01:00	Mar-Oct
FCS	KFCS	Butts Army Airfield (Fort Carson)	Colorado Springs, Colorado, United States	UTC−07:00	Mar-Nov
FCY	KFCY	Forrest City Municipal Airport	Forrest City, Arkansas, United States	UTC−06:00	Mar-Nov
-FD-
FDE	ENBL	Førde Airport, Bringeland	Førde, Norway	UTC+01:00	Mar-Oct
FDF	TFFF	Martinique Aimé Césaire International Airport	Fort-de-France, Martinique	UTC−04:00	
FDH	EDNY	Friedrichshafen Airport (Bodensee Airport)	Friedrichshafen, Baden-Württemberg, Germany	UTC+01:00	Mar-Oct
FDK	KFDK	Frederick Municipal Airport	Frederick, Maryland, United States	UTC−05:00	Mar-Nov
FDR	KFDR	Frederick Regional Airport	Frederick, Oklahoma, United States	UTC−06:00	Mar-Nov
FDU	FZBO	Bandundu Airport	Bandundu, Democratic Republic of the Congo	UTC+01:00	
FDY	KFDY	Findlay Airport	Findlay, Ohio, United States	UTC−05:00	Mar-Nov
-FE-
FEA		Fetlar Airport	Fetlar, Scotland, United Kingdom	UTC±00:00	Mar-Oct
FEB	VNSR	Sanfebagar Airport	Sanfebagar, Nepal	UTC+05:45	
FEC	SNJD	Feira de Santana Airport (Gov. João Durval Carneiro Airport)	Feira de Santana, Bahia, Brazil	UTC−03:00	
FEG	UTKF	Fergana International Airport	Fergana, Uzbekistan	UTC+05:00	
FEJ	SNOU	Feijó Airport	Feijó, Acre, Brazil	UTC−05:00	
FEK	DIFK	Ferkessédougou Airport	Ferkessédougou, Ivory Coast	UTC±00:00	
FEL	ETSF	Fürstenfeldbruck Air Base	Fürstenfeldbruck, Bavaria, Germany	UTC+01:00	Mar-Oct
FEN	SBFN	Fernando de Noronha Airport (Gov. Carlos Wilson Airport)	Fernando de Noronha, Pernambuco, Brazil	UTC−02:00	
FEP	KFEP	Albertus Airport	Freeport, Illinois, United States	UTC−06:00	Mar-Nov
FET	KFET	Fremont Municipal Airport	Fremont, Nebraska, United States	UTC−06:00	Mar-Nov
FEZ	GMFF	Fes–Saïss Airport	Fez, Morocco	UTC±00:00	Mar-Oct^{1}
-FF-
FFA	KFFA	First Flight Airport	Kill Devil Hills, North Carolina, United States	UTC−05:00	Mar-Nov
FFD	EGVA	RAF Fairford	Fairford, England, United Kingdom	UTC±00:00	Mar-Oct
FFL	KFFL	Fairfield Municipal Airport	Fairfield, Iowa, United States	UTC−06:00	Mar-Nov
FFM	KFFM	Fergus Falls Municipal Airport (Einar Mickelson Field)	Fergus Falls, Minnesota, United States	UTC−06:00	Mar-Nov
FFO	KFFO	Wright-Patterson Air Force Base (First Flight-Office)	Dayton, Ohio, United States	UTC−05:00	Mar-Nov
FFT	KFFT	Capital City Airport	Frankfort, Kentucky, United States	UTC−05:00	Mar-Nov
FFU	SCFT	Futaleufú Airfield	Futaleufú, Chile	UTC−04:00	Aug-May
-FG-
FGD	GQPF	Fderik Airport	Fderîck, Mauritania	UTC±00:00	
FGI	NSFI	Fagali'i Airport	Apia, Upolu Island, Samoa	UTC+13:00	Sep-Apr
FGU	NTGB	Fangatau Airport	Fangatau, Tuamotus, French Polynesia	UTC−10:00	
-FH-
FHU	KFHU	Sierra Vista Municipal Airport (Libby Army Airfield)	Sierra Vista, Arizona, United States	UTC−07:00	
FHZ	NTKH	Fakahina Airport	Fakahina, Tuamotus, French Polynesia	UTC−10:00	
-FI-
FID		Elizabeth Field (FAA: 0B8)	Fishers Island, New York, United States	UTC−05:00	Mar-Nov
FIE	EGEF	Fair Isle Airport	Fair Isle, Scotland, United Kingdom	UTC±00:00	Mar-Oct
FIG	GUFA	Fria Airport	Fria, Guinea	UTC±00:00	
FIH	FZAA	N'djili Airport (Kinshasa Int'l Airport)	Kinshasa, Democratic Republic of the Congo	UTC+01:00	
FIK	YFNE	Finke Airport	Finke (Aputula), Northern Territory, Australia	UTC+09:30	
FIL	KFOM	Fillmore Municipal Airport (FAA: FOM)	Fillmore, Utah, United States	UTC−07:00	Mar-Nov
FIN	AYFI	Finschhafen Airport	Finschhafen, Papua New Guinea	UTC+10:00	
FIZ	YFTZ	Fitzroy Crossing Airport	Fitzroy Crossing, Western Australia, Australia	UTC+08:00	
-FJ-
FJR	OMFJ	Fujairah International Airport	Fujairah, United Arab Emirates	UTC+04:00	
-FK-
FKB	EDSB	Karlsruhe/Baden-Baden Airport	Karlsruhe / Baden-Baden, Baden-Württemberg, Germany	UTC+01:00	Mar-Oct
FKI	FZIC	Bangoka International Airport	Kisangani, Democratic Republic of the Congo	UTC+02:00	
FKJ	RJNF	Fukui Airport	Fukui, Honshu, Japan	UTC+09:00	
FKL	KFKL	Venango Regional Airport (Chess Lamberton Field)	Franklin, Pennsylvania, United States	UTC−05:00	Mar-Nov
FKN	KFKN	Franklin Municipal–John Beverly Rose Airport	Franklin, Virginia, United States	UTC−05:00	Mar-Nov
FKQ	WASF	Fakfak Torea Airport	Fakfak, Indonesia	UTC+09:00	
FKS	RJSF	Fukushima Airport	Sukagawa, Honshu, Japan	UTC+09:00	
-FL-
FLA	SKFL	Gustavo Artunduaga Paredes Airport	Florencia (Caquetá), Colombia	UTC−05:00	
FLB	SNQG	Cangapara Airport	Floriano, Piauí, Brazil	UTC−03:00	
FLD	KFLD	Fond du Lac County Airport	Fond du Lac, Wisconsin, United States	UTC−06:00	Mar-Nov
FLF	EDXF	Flensburg-Schäferhaus Airport	Flensburg, Schleswig-Holstein, Germany	UTC+01:00	Mar-Oct
FLG	KFLG	Flagstaff Pulliam Airport	Flagstaff, Arizona, United States	UTC−07:00	
FLH		Flotta Isle Airport	Flotta, Scotland, United Kingdom	UTC±00:00	Mar-Oct
FLI		Holt Airport	Flateyri, Iceland	UTC±00:00	
FLL	KFLL	Fort Lauderdale–Hollywood International Airport	Fort Lauderdale / Hollywood, Florida, United States	UTC−05:00	Mar-Nov
FLM	SGFI	Filadelfia Airport	Filadelfia, Paraguay	UTC−04:00	Oct-Mar
FLN	SBFL	Hercílio Luz International Airport	Florianópolis, Santa Catarina, Brazil	UTC−03:00	
FLO	KFLO	Florence Regional Airport	Florence, South Carolina, United States	UTC−05:00	Mar-Nov
FLP	KFLP	Marion County Regional Airport	Flippin, Arkansas, United States	UTC−06:00	Mar-Nov
FLR	LIRQ	Florence Airport, Peretola (Amerigo Vespucci Airport)	Florence, Tuscany, Italy	UTC+01:00	Mar-Oct
FLS	YFLI	Flinders Island Airport	Flinders Island, Tasmania, Australia	UTC+10:00	Oct-Apr
FLT		Flat Airport	Flat, Alaska, United States	UTC−09:00	Mar-Nov
FLV	KFLV	Sherman Army Airfield	Fort Leavenworth, Kansas, United States	UTC−06:00	Mar-Nov
FLW	LPFL	Flores Airport	Flores Island, Azores, Portugal	UTC−01:00	Mar-Oct
FLX	KFLX	Fallon Municipal Airport	Fallon, Nevada, United States	UTC−08:00	Mar-Nov
FLY	YFIL	Finley Airport	Finley, New South Wales, Australia	UTC+10:00	Oct-Apr
FLZ	WIMS	Ferdinand Lumban Tobing Airport	Sibolga, Indonesia	UTC+07:00	
-FM-
FMA	SARF	Formosa International Airport (El Pucú Airport)	Formosa, Argentina	UTC−03:00	
FME	KFME	Tipton Airport	Fort Meade / Odenton, Maryland, United States	UTC−05:00	Mar-Nov
FMH	KFMH	Otis Air National Guard Base	Falmouth, Massachusetts, United States	UTC−05:00	Mar-Nov
FMI	FZRF	Kalemie Airport	Kalemie, Democratic Republic of the Congo	UTC+02:00	
FMM	EDJA	Memmingen Airport	Memmingen, Bavaria, Germany	UTC+01:00	Mar-Oct
FMN	KFMN	Four Corners Regional Airport	Farmington, New Mexico, United States	UTC−07:00	Mar-Nov
FMO	EDDG	Münster Osnabrück Airport	Münster / Osnabrück (LS), North Rhine-Westphalia, Germany	UTC+01:00	Mar-Oct
FMS	KFSW	Fort Madison Municipal Airport (FAA: FSW)	Fort Madison, Iowa, United States	UTC−06:00	Mar-Nov
FMU		Florence Municipal Airport (FAA: 6S2)	Florence, Oregon, United States	UTC−08:00	Mar-Nov
FMY	KFMY	Page Field	Fort Myers, Florida, United States	UTC−05:00	Mar-Nov
-FN-
FNA	GFLL	Lungi International Airport	Freetown, Sierra Leone	UTC±00:00	
FNB	ETNU	Neubrandenburg Airport	Neubrandenburg, Mecklenburg-Vorpommern, Germany	UTC+01:00	Mar-Oct
FNC	LPMA	Madeira Airport	Funchal, Madeira, Portugal	UTC±00:00	Mar-Oct
FND		Funadhoo Airport	Funadhoo, Shaviyani Atoll, Maldives	UTC+05:00	
FNE	AYFA	Fane Airport	Fane, Papua New Guinea	UTC+10:00	
FNG	DFEF	Fada N'gourma Airport	Fada N'gourma, Burkina Faso	UTC±00:00	
FNH	HAFN	Fincha Airport	Fincha, Ethiopia	UTC+03:00	
FNI	LFTW	Nîmes–Alès–Camargue–Cévennes Airport (Garons Airport)	Nîmes, Languedoc-Roussillon, France	UTC+01:00	Mar-Oct
FNJ	ZKPY	Pyongyang Sunan International Airport	Pyongyang, North Korea	UTC+08:30	
FNL	KFNL	Fort Collins–Loveland Municipal Airport	Fort Collins/Loveland, Colorado, United States	UTC−07:00	Mar-Nov
FNR	PANR	Funter Bay Seaplane Base	Funter Bay, Alaska, United States	UTC−09:00	Mar-Nov
FNT	KFNT	Bishop International Airport	Flint, Michigan, United States	UTC−05:00	Mar-Nov
FNU	LIER	Oristano-Fenosu Airport	Oristano, Sardinia, Italy	UTC+01:00	Mar-Oct
-FO-
FOA		Foula Airfield	Foula, Scotland, United Kingdom	UTC±00:00	Mar-Oct
FOB		Fort Bragg Airport (FAA: 82CL)	Fort Bragg, California, United States	UTC−08:00	Mar-Nov
FOC	ZSFZ	Fuzhou Changle International Airport	Fuzhou, Fujian, China	UTC+08:00	
FOD	KFOD	Fort Dodge Regional Airport	Fort Dodge, Iowa, United States	UTC−06:00	Mar-Nov
FOE	KFOE	Topeka Regional Airport	Topeka, Kansas, United States	UTC−06:00	Mar-Nov
FOG	LIBF	Foggia "Gino Lisa" Airport	Foggia, Apulia, Italy	UTC+01:00	Mar-Oct
FOK	KFOK	Francis S. Gabreski Airport	Westhampton Beach, New York, United States	UTC−05:00	Mar-Nov
FOM	FKKM	Foumban Nkounja Airport	Foumban, Cameroon	UTC+01:00	
FON	MRAN	La Fortuna Arenal Airport	La Fortuna, Costa Rica	UTC−06:00	
FOO		Kornasoren Airport (Numfoor Airport)	Numfoor, Indonesia	UTC+09:00	
FOR	SBFZ	Pinto Martins – Fortaleza International Airport	Fortaleza, Ceará, Brazil	UTC−03:00	
FOS	YFRT	Forrest Airport	Forrest, Western Australia, Australia	UTC+08:00	
FOT	YFST	Forster (Wallis Island) Airport	Forster, New South Wales, Australia	UTC+10:00	Oct-Apr
FOU	FOGF	Fougamou Airport	Fougamou, Gabon	UTC+01:00	
FOY		Foya Airport	Foya, Liberia	UTC±00:00	
-FP-
FPO	MYGF	Grand Bahama International Airport	Freeport, Grand Bahama, Bahamas	UTC−05:00	Mar-Nov
FPR	KFPR	St. Lucie County International Airport	Fort Pierce, Florida, United States	UTC−05:00	Mar-Nov
FPY		Perry-Foley Airport (FAA: 40J)	Perry, Florida, United States	UTC−05:00	Mar-Nov
-FR-
FRA	EDDF	Frankfurt Airport	Frankfurt, Hessen, Germany	UTC+01:00	Mar-Oct
FRB	YFBS	Forbes Airport	Forbes, New South Wales, Australia	UTC+10:00	Oct-Apr
FRC	SIMK	Franca Airport (Ten. Lund Presotto–Franca State Airport)	Franca, São Paulo, Brazil	UTC−03:00	
FRD	KFHR	Friday Harbor Airport (FAA: FHR)	Friday Harbor, Washington, United States	UTC−08:00	Mar-Nov
FRE	AGGF	Fera Airport (Fera/Maringe Airport)	Fera Island, Isabel Province, Solomon Islands	UTC+11:00	
FRG	KFRG	Republic Airport	Farmingdale, New York, United States	UTC−05:00	Mar-Nov
FRH	KFRH	French Lick Municipal Airport	French Lick, Indiana, United States	UTC−05:00	Mar-Nov
FRI	KFRI	Marshall Army Airfield	Fort Riley, Kansas, United States	UTC−06:00	Mar-Nov
FRK	FSSF	Frégate Island Airport	Frégate Island, Seychelles	UTC+04:00	
FRL	LIPK	Forlì International Airport (Luigi Ridolfi Airport)	Forlì, Emilia-Romagna, Italy	UTC+01:00	Mar-Oct
FRM	KFRM	Fairmont Municipal Airport	Fairmont, Minnesota, United States	UTC−06:00	Mar-Nov
FRN	PAFR	Bryant Army Airport	Anchorage, Alaska, United States	UTC−09:00	Mar-Nov
FRO	ENFL	Florø Airport	Florø, Norway	UTC+01:00	Mar-Oct
FRQ	AYFE	Feramin Airport	Feramin, Papua New Guinea	UTC+10:00	
FRR	KFRR	Front Royal–Warren County Airport	Front Royal, Virginia, United States	UTC−05:00	Mar-Nov
FRS	MGTK	Mundo Maya International Airport	Flores, Guatemala	UTC−06:00	
FRT	SCFI	Frutillar Airport	Frutillar, Chile	UTC−04:00	Aug-May
FRW	FBFT	Francistown Airport	Francistown, Botswana	UTC+02:00	
FRY	KIZG	Eastern Slopes Regional Airport (FAA: IZG)	Fryeburg, Maine, United States	UTC−05:00	Mar-Nov
FRZ	ETHF	Fritzlar Air Base	Fritzlar, Hesse, Germany	UTC+01:00	Mar-Oct
-FS-
FSC	LFKF	Figari–Sud Corse Airport	Figari, Corsica, France	UTC+01:00	Mar-Oct
FSD	KFSD	Sioux Falls Regional Airport (Joe Foss Field)	Sioux Falls, South Dakota, United States	UTC−06:00	Mar-Nov
FSI	KFSI	Henry Post Army Airfield (Fort Sill)	Lawton, Oklahoma, United States	UTC−06:00	Mar-Nov
FSK	KFSK	Fort Scott Municipal Airport	Fort Scott, Kansas, United States	UTC−06:00	Mar-Nov
FSL		Fossil Downs Airport	Fossil Downs Station, Western Australia, Australia	UTC+08:00	
FSM	KFSM	Fort Smith Regional Airport	Fort Smith, Arkansas, United States	UTC−06:00	Mar-Nov
FSP	LFVP	Saint-Pierre Airport	Saint-Pierre, Saint Pierre and Miquelon	UTC−03:00	Mar-Nov
FSS	EGQK	RAF Kinloss	Forres, Scotland, United Kingdom	UTC±00:00	Mar-Oct
FST	KFST	Fort Stockton–Pecos County Airport	Fort Stockton, Texas, United States	UTC−06:00	Mar-Nov
FSU	KFSU	Fort Sumner Municipal Airport	Fort Sumner, New Mexico, United States	UTC−07:00	Mar-Nov
FSZ	RJNS	Shizuoka Airport (Mt. Fuji Shizuoka Airport)	Shizuoka, Honshu, Japan	UTC+09:00	
-FT-
FTA	NVVF	Futuna Airport	Futuna Island, Tafea, Vanuatu	UTC+11:00	
FTE	SAWA	Comandante Armando Tola International Airport	El Calafate, Santa Cruz, Argentina	UTC−03:00	
FTI	NSFQ	Fitiuta Airport (FAA: FAQ)	Fitiuta, American Samoa, United States	UTC−11:00	
FTK	KFTK	Godman Army Airfield	Fort Knox, Kentucky, United States	UTC−05:00	Mar-Nov
FTU	FMSD	Tôlanaro Airport (Marillac Airport)	Tôlanaro, Madagascar	UTC+03:00	
FTW	KFTW	Fort Worth Meacham International Airport	Fort Worth, Texas, United States	UTC−06:00	Mar-Nov
FTX	FCOO	Owando Airport	Owando, Republic of the Congo	UTC+01:00	
FTY	KFTY	Fulton County Airport (Charlie Brown Field)	Atlanta, Georgia, United States	UTC−05:00	Mar-Nov
-FU-
FUB		Fulleborn Airport	Fulleborn, Papua New Guinea	UTC+10:00	
FUE	GCFV	Fuerteventura Airport	Fuerteventura, Canary Islands, Spain	UTC±00:00	Mar-Oct
FUG	ZSFY	Fuyang Xiguan Airport	Fuyang, Anhui, China	UTC+08:00	
FUJ	RJFE	Fukue Airport (Gotō-Fukue Airport)	Gotō, Gotō Islands, Japan	UTC+09:00	
FUK	RJFF	Fukuoka Airport (Itazuke Air Base)	Fukuoka, Kyushu, Japan	UTC+09:00	
FUL	KFUL	Fullerton Municipal Airport	Fullerton, California, United States	UTC−08:00	Mar-Nov
FUM		Fuma Airport	Fuma, Papua New Guinea	UTC+10:00	
FUN	NGFU	Funafuti International Airport	Funafuti, Tuvalu	UTC+12:00	
FUO	ZGFS	Foshan Shadi Airport	Foshan, Guangdong, China	UTC+08:00	
FUT	NLWF	Pointe Vele Airport	Futuna Island, Wallis and Futuna	UTC+12:00	
-FV-
FVL	YFLO	Flora Valley Airport	Flora Valley, Western Australia, Australia	UTC+08:00	
FVM	VRMF	Fuvahmulah Airport	Fuvahmulah, Gnaviyani Atoll, Maldives	UTC+05:00	
FVR	YFRV	Forrest River Airport	Forrest River Mission, Western Australia, Australia	UTC+08:00	
-FW-
FWA	KFWA	Fort Wayne International Airport	Fort Wayne, Indiana, United States	UTC−05:00	Mar-Nov
FWH	KNFW	NAS Fort Worth JRB / Carswell Field (FAA: NFW)	Fort Worth, Texas, United States	UTC−06:00	Mar-Nov
FWL	PAFW	Farewell Airport	Farewell, Alaska, United States	UTC−09:00	Mar-Nov
-FX-
FXE	KFXE	Fort Lauderdale Executive Airport	Fort Lauderdale, Florida, United States	UTC−05:00	Mar-Nov
FXO	FQCB	Cuamba Airport	Cuamba, Mozambique	UTC+02:00	
FXY	KFXY	Forest City Municipal Airport	Forest City, Iowa, United States	UTC−06:00	Mar-Nov
-FY-
FYJ	ZYFY	Fuyuan Dongji Airport	Fuyuan, Heilongjiang, China	UTC+08:00	
FYM	KFYM	Fayetteville Municipal Airport	Fayetteville, Tennessee, United States	UTC−06:00	Mar-Nov
FYN	ZWFY	Fuyun Koktokay Airport	Fuyun, Xinjiang, China	UTC+06:00	
FYT	FTTY	Faya-Largeau Airport	Faya-Largeau, Chad	UTC+01:00	
FYU	PFYU	Fort Yukon Airport	Fort Yukon, Alaska, United States	UTC−09:00	Mar-Nov
FYV	KFYV	Drake Field (Fayetteville Executive Airport)	Fayetteville, Arkansas, United States	UTC−06:00	Mar-Nov
-FZ-
FZO	EGTG	Bristol Filton Airport	Bristol, England, United Kingdom	UTC±00:00	Mar-Oct
FZL	UBBF	Fuzuli International Airport	Fuzuli, Karabakh, Azerbaijan	UTC+04:00	

== Notes ==
- ^1 Morocco temporarily suspends DST for the month of Ramadan.
