= List of airports in Guinea =

This is a list of airports in Guinea, sorted by location.

== List ==
Airport names shown in bold indicate that the facility has commercial services on scheduled airlines.

Location	ICAO	IATA	Airport name
Banankoro	GUGO		Gbenko Airport
Beyla	GUBE		Beyla Airport
Boké	GUOK	BKJ	Boké Baralande Airport
Conakry	GUCY	CKY	**Conakry International Airport** (Gbessia Int'l)
Faranah	GUFH	FAA	Faranah Airport
Fria	GUFA	FIG	Fria Airport
Port Kamsar	GUKR		Kawass Airport
Kankan	GUXD	KNN	Kankan Airport
Kissidougou	GUKU	KSI	Kissidougou Airport
Koundara	GUSB	SBI	Sambailo Airport
Labe	GULB	LEK	Tata Airport
Macenta	GUMA	MCA	Macenta Airport
Nzérékoré	GUNZ	NZE	Nzérékoré Airport
Sangarédi	GUSA		Sangarédi Airport
Siguiri	GUSI	GII	Siguiri Airport

== See also ==
- Transport in Guinea
- List of airports by ICAO code: G#GU - Guinea
- Wikipedia: WikiProject Aviation/Airline destination lists: Africa#Guinea
