= Banankoro =

Banankoro may refer to:

- Banankoro, Beyla, a town in Guinea
- Banankoro, Kérouané, a town in Guinea
