= Lists of airports =

An airport is an aerodrome with facilities for flights to take off and land. Airports often have facilities to store and maintain aircraft, and a control tower. An airport consists of a landing area, which comprises an aerially accessible open space including at least one operationally active surface such as a runway for a plane to take off or a helipad, and often includes adjacent utility buildings such as control towers, hangars and terminals.

An airport with a helipad for rotorcraft but no runway is called a heliport. An airport for use by seaplanes and amphibious aircraft is called a seaplane base. Such a base typically includes a stretch of open water for takeoffs and landings, and seaplane docks for tying-up. An international airport has additional facilities for customs and immigration.

== By continent ==
- Lists of airports in Africa
- List of airports in Antarctica
- Lists of airports in Asia
- Lists of airports in Europe
- Lists of airports in North America
- Lists of airports in Oceania
- Lists of airports in South America

== Busiest airports ==
=== By traffic type ===
- List of busiest airports by aircraft movements
- List of busiest airports by cargo traffic
- List of busiest airports by passenger traffic
- List of busiest airports by international passenger traffic

=== By continent ===
- List of the busiest airports in Africa
- List of the busiest airports in Asia
- List of the busiest airports in Europe
- List of the busiest airports in North America
- List of the busiest airports in Oceania
- List of the busiest airports in South America

== By code ==
=== By IATA code ===
- A
- B
- C
- D
- E
- F
- G
- H
- I
- J
- K
- L
- M
- N
- O
- P
- Q
- R
- S
- T
- U
- V
- W
- X
- Y
- Z

=== By ICAO code ===
- A
- B
- C
- D
- EB-EG
- EH-EY
- FA-FM
- FN-FZ
- G
- H
- I
- J
- KA-KH
- KI-KP
- KR-KZ
- L
- M
- N
- O
- P
- Q
- R
- S
- T
- U
- V
- W
- X
- Y
- Z

== By elevation ==
- List of highest airports
- List of lowest airports

== Other ==
- List of international airports by country
- List of eponyms of airports - airports named after people
- List of airports with triple takeoff/landing capability
- List of airports by metropolitan area, see: Category:Airports by city
- List of airports with scheduled commercial service, see: Airline destinations
- Lists of military installations

== See also ==
- List of countries without an airport
- List of cities with more than one commercial airport
- List of defunct international airports
- List of IATA-indexed railway stations
- Lists of ports
- Seaport
