= Kouya Sidia =

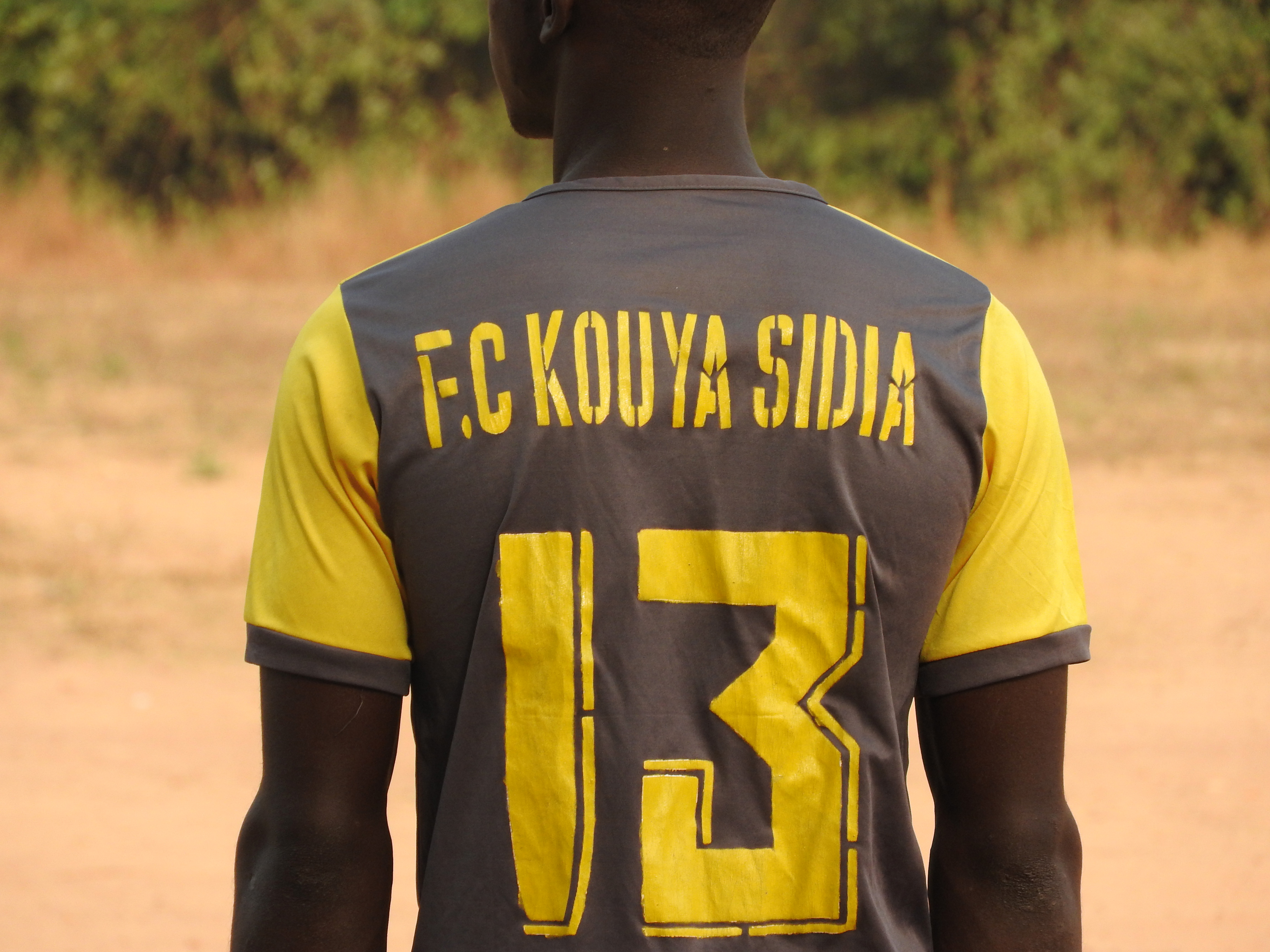
- FC Kouya Sidia

- Location within Guinea
- Coordinates: 9.795°N 10.083°W

Population (2020)
  - Total: 1,200

Kouya Sidia is a village in the Faranah region of Guinea. It has a population of 1200.

== Description ==
The village is led by Mamady Conde who replaced his elder brother Yonay in 2014 as the Sotikemo (Chief). The town has a three-room school which serves this village and Simbun and Duoko. The population is about 1,200 people, who live in buildings made from air-dried bricks. The hospital is constructed from concrete.

== History ==
From 2014 to 2018 the village had three new wells installed and a new school. In 2019, a benefit concert was held at an arts centre in Cumberland, Maine to help fund the addition of a library to his home village.
