= Mohamed Gassim Bangoura =

Guinean politician

Deputy in the National Assembly (Guinea)
- President: Alpha Conde
- Preceded by: Sény Sabany Bangoura
- Constituency: Fria

Personal details
- Party: Rally of the Guinean People
- Committees: Commerce, Hotels, Tourism and Handicrafts

Mohamed Gassim Bangoura is a Guinean politician who represents the constituency of Fria, in the National Assembly (Guinea). He is a member of the Majority Rally of the Guinean People Party of former president Alpha Conde. Member of the Trade, Hotels, Tourism and Crafts Committee of the 9th Legislature of the Republic of Guinea.
