= UN/LOCODE =

Geographic coding scheme

UN/LOCODE, the United Nations Code for Trade and Transport Locations, or in a more simplified form United Nations location code, is a geographic coding scheme developed and maintained by United Nations Economic Commission for Europe (UNECE). UN/LOCODE assigns codes to locations used in trade and transport with functions such as seaports, rail and road terminals, airports, postal exchange offices, and border crossing points. The first issue in 1981 contained codes for 8,000 locations.

== Structure ==
UN/LOCODEs have five characters. The first two letters code a country by the table defined in ISO 3166-1 alpha-2. The three remaining characters code a location within that country. Letters are preferred, but if necessary digits 2 through 9 may be used, excluding "0" and "1" to avoid confusion with the letters "O" and "I" respectively.

For each country there can be a maximum of 17,576 entries using only letters (26×26×26), or 39,304 entries using letters and digits (34×34×34).

For the US, the letter combinations have almost all been exhausted. So in 2006, the Secretariat added 646 entries with a digit as the last character.

For airports, the three letters following the country code are not always identical to the IATA airport code. According to the Secretariat note for Issue 2006-2, there are 720 locations showing a different IATA code.

== See also ==
- Lists of airports by IATA and ICAO code
- List of IATA-indexed railway stations
