= KNN =

KNN may refer to:

- k-nearest neighbors algorithm (k-NN), a method for classifying objects
- Nearest neighbor graph (k-NNG), a graph connecting each point to its k nearest neighbors
- Khanna railway station, in Khanna, Punjab, India (by Indian Railways code)
- Kings Norton railway station, in Birmingham, England (by National Rail code)
- Knighton News Network, the recurring TV station which hosts the news recap by Herb Herbertson at the beginning of every episode of Nexo Knights
- Konkani language, spoken in the Konkan coast of India (by ISO 639-3 language code)
- Korea New Network, broadcast television in South Korea
- Kurdish News Network, news television network in Iraqi Kurdistan
- Kankan Airport, Guinea (by IATA airport code)
