= Lists of airports in South America =

This page contains the lists of airports in South America by country. The lists include both military air bases and civilian airports.

== List ==
- List of airports in Argentina
- List of airports in Bolivia
- List of airports in Brazil
- List of airports in Chile
- List of airports in Colombia
- List of airports in Ecuador
- List of airports in the Falkland Islands
- List of airports in French Guiana
- List of airports in Guyana
- List of airports in Paraguay
- List of airports in Peru
- List of airports in Suriname
- List of airports in Uruguay
- List of airports in Venezuela

== See also ==
- Lists of airports
- List of the busiest airports in South America
- Wikipedia:WikiProject Aviation/Airline destination lists: South America
