= Juami-Japurá Ecological Station =

Ecological station in Japurá, Amazonas, Brazil

- Estação Ecológica Juami-Japurá
- IUCN category Ia (strict nature reserve)
- Location within Brazil
- Nearest city: Fonte Boa, Amazonas
- Coordinates: 2.233°S 68.359°W
- Area: 831,524 hectares (2,054,740 acres)
- Designation: ecological station
- Created: 3 June 1985
- Established: 3 June 1985

Juami-Japurá Ecological Station (Portuguese: Estação Ecológica Juami-Japurá) is an ecological station in the municipality of Japurá, Amazonas, Brazil.

== Location ==
The Ecological Station of 831.524 hectares (2,054.74 acres) was created by decree on 3 June 1985, amended on 11 October 2011. It is administered by the Chico Mendes Institute for Biodiversity Conservation. It became part of the Central Amazon Ecological Corridor, created in 2002. The protection unit is located on the right bank of the Japurá River in the municipality of Japurá, Amazonas. It is only accessible by boat.

== Environment ==
Juam-Japurá Ecological Station lies in the Amazon plain, with altitudes that range from 45 to 450 metres (148 to 1,476 ft) above sea level. It covers the entire basin of the black water Juami River, which flows into the white water Japurá River. The highest land is on the edges of the unit, and delimits the river basin. The conservation unit has a tropical rainforest climate. Average rainfall is 2,850 millimetres (112 in). Temperatures range from 19 to 43 °C (66 to 109 °F) with an average of 25 °C (77 °F). The vegetation is Rain Forest Lowland.

== Conservation ==
The Ecological Station is a "strict nature reserve" under IUCN protected area category Ia. Its purpose is to secure nature and biodiversity and to support scientific research and environmental education. The conservation unit is supported by the Amazon Region Protected Areas Program. It preserves a representative sample of the interfluvial region between the Içá River and Japurá River, tributaries of the Solimões River. The bald uakari (Cacajao calvus rubicundus) is protected in the reserve. There have been reports of mining activity in the vicinity. Inspection is difficult due to lack of infrastructure.

== Sources ==
- CEC Central da Amazônia (in Portuguese), ISA: Instituto Socioambiental
- "Estação Ecológica Juami-Japurá", Ambiente Brasil (in Portuguese)
- Estação Ecológica Juami-Japurá (in Portuguese), Chico Mendes Institute for Biodiversity Conservation, archived from the original on 2016-08-10
- Full list: PAs supported by ARPA, ARPA
- Unidade de Conservação: Estação Ecológica Juami-Japurá (in Portuguese), MMA: Ministério do Meio Ambiente
