= Gbenko Airport =

Airport in Gbenko, Guinea

Gbenko Airport Aéroport de Gbenko (French)
- IATA: none; ICAO: GUGO

Summary
- Airport type: Public
- Serves: Banankoro, Guinea
- Location: Gbenko
- Elevation AMSL: 2,133 ft / 650 m
- Coordinates: 9°14′30″N 9°17′50″W

Map
- Location of the airport in Guinea

Runways
Direction	Length		Surface
Direction	m	ft	Surface
11/29	1,600	5,249	Dirt
- Source: Google Maps GCM

Gbenko Airport (ICAO: GUGO) is an airstrip serving Banankoro in Guinea. It is 4 miles (6.4 km) north of Banankoro, near the village of Gbenko.

The Gbenko non-directional beacon (Ident: GK) is located on the field.

== See also ==
- Transport in Guinea
- List of airports in Guinea
