= Siguiri Airport =

Airport in Guinea

Siguiri Airport Aéroport de Siguiri (French)
- IATA: GII; ICAO: GUSI

Summary
- Airport type: Public
- Owner/Operator: ANAC Guinea
- Serves: Siguiri, Guinea
- Elevation AMSL: 1,296 ft (395 m)
- Coordinates: 11°24′00″N 9°11′15″W

Map
- Location of the airport in Guinea

Runways
Direction	Length		Surface
Direction	m	ft	Surface
11/29	1,495	4,905	Gravel
- Source: Google Maps GCM

Siguiri Airport (IATA: GII, ICAO: GUSI) is an airport serving Siguiri, a river port in western Guinea. The airport is south of the town and 2 kilometres (1.2 mi) west of the Niger River.

== See also ==
- Transport in Guinea
- List of airports in Guinea
