= Beyla Airport =

Airport in Guinea

Beyla Airport Aéroport de Beyla (French)
- IATA: none; ICAO: GUBE

Summary
- Airport type: Public
- Serves: Beyla, Guinea
- Elevation AMSL: 2,190 ft / 668 m
- Coordinates: 8°41′50″N 8°42′50″W

Map
- Location of the airport in Guinea

Runways
Direction	Length		Surface
Direction	m	ft	Surface
15/33	1,830	6,004	Asphalt
- Source: Google Maps OurAirports

Beyla Airport (ICAO: GUBE) is an airport serving the town of Beyla in the Nzérékoré Region of Guinea. The airport is 9 kilometres (5.6 mi) west of Beyla.

== See also ==
- Transport in Guinea
- List of airports in Guinea
