= List of the busiest airports in Latin America =

-- This is a list of the busiest airports by passenger traffic in Latin America since 2008.

== 2026(JAN-SEP) ==
Rank	Airport	City served	Country	Passengers	Annual change	Position change
1	São Paulo/Guarulhos International Airport	São Paulo	Brazil	35'912,417	▲TBD%	Steady
2	El Dorado International Airport	Bogotá	Colombia	34'365,417	▲TBD%	▼1
3	Mexico City International Airport	Mexico City	Mexico	33'671,932	▲1.40%	▼1
4	Cancún International Airport	Cancún	Mexico	20'882,658	▲TBD%	Steady
5	Jorge Chávez International Airport	Lima	Peru	18'613,268(AUG)	▲4.43%	▲1
6	Arturo Merino Benítez International Airport	Santiago	Chile	19'244,000	▼TBD%	▼1
7	São Paulo–Congonhas Airport	São Paulo	Brazil	18'564,361	▲3.40%	Steady
8	Tocumen International Airport	Panama City	Panama	17'818,114	▲15.00%	Steady
9	Rio de Janeiro/Galeão International Airport	Rio de Janeiro	Brazil	14'284,611	▲TBD%	Steady
10	Guadalajara International Airport	Guadalajara	Mexico	14'272,900	▲4.20%	Steady
11	Brasília International Airport	Brasília	Brazil	12'931,180	▲TBD%	Steady
12	Aeroparque Jorge Newbery	Buenos Aires	Argentina	12'849,000	▼ -3.00%	▲1
13	Monterrey International Airport	Monterrey	Mexico	11'610,052	▲0.80%	▲2
14	José María Córdova International Airport	Medellín	Colombia	10'958,169	▲TBD%	▼1
15	Luis Muñoz Marín International Airport	San Juan	Puerto Rico	10'232,656	▲TBD%	▼1
16	Belo Horizonte International Airport	Belo Horizonte	Brazil	9'795,262	▲TDB%	▲2
17	Viracopos International Airport	Campinas	Brazil	9'342,035	▼1.60%	▲1
18	Ezeiza International Airport	Buenos Aires	Argentina	9'235,000	▲8.00%	▲1
19	Tijuana International Airport	Tijuana	Mexico	8'984,600	▼5.20%	▼1
20	Punta Cana International Airport	Punta Cana	Dominican Republic	8'882,879	▲TBD%	▼2
21	Recife/Guararapes–Gilberto Freyre International Airport	Recife	Brazil	7'488,017	▲2.30%	Steady
22	Salgado Filho Porto Alegre International Airport	Porto Alegre	Brazil	6'088,183	▲14.300%	Steady
23	Rafael Núñez International Airport	Cartagena	Colombia	5'734,303	▲1.20%	▲1
24	Salvador Bahia Airport	Salvador	Brazil	5'562,100	▲TBD%	▲2
25	Felipe Angeles International Airport	Mexico City	Mexico	4'338,663(JUL)	▲TBD%	▲3
26	Los Cabos International Airport	Los Cabos	Mexico	5'351,200	▼ -5.60%	▼3
27	Alfonso Bonilla Aragón International Airport	Cali	Colombia	5'236,024	▲TBD%	Steady
28	Juan Santamaría International Airport	San José	Costa Rica	4'835,976	▲0.50%	▲1
28	Puerto Vallarta International Airport	Puerto Vallarta	Mexico	4'540,200	▼12.30%	▼4
30	Santos Dumont Airport	Rio de Janeiro	Brazil	3'701,001(JUL)	▲0.90%	▼1
31	Fortaleza International Airport	Fortaleza	Brazil	4'656,816	▲2.50%	Steady

== 2025 ==
Rank	Airport	City served	Country	Passengers	Annual change	Position change
1	São Paulo/Guarulhos International Airport	São Paulo	Brazil	47,188,085	▲8.28%	▲1
2	El Dorado International Airport	Bogotá	Colombia	45,470,707	▼0.81%	▼1
3	Mexico City International Airport	Mexico City	Mexico	44,605,576	▼1.66%	▼1
4	Cancún International Airport	Cancún	Mexico	29,345,538	▼3.51%	Steady
5	Jorge Chávez International Airport	Lima	Peru	27,420,159	▲5.12%	Steady
6	Arturo Merino Benítez International Airport	Santiago	Chile	25,941,414	▲0.39%	Steady
7	São Paulo–Congonhas Airport	São Paulo	Brazil	24,491,178	▲5.88%	Steady
8	Tocumen International Airport	Panama City	Panama	20,981,855	▲9.00%	Steady
9	Guadalajara International Airport	Guadalajara	Mexico	18,696,600	▲4.75%	Steady
10	Rio de Janeiro/Galeão International Airport	Rio de Janeiro	Brazil	17,906,990	▲23.56%	▲2
11	Aeroparque Jorge Newbery	Buenos Aires	Argentina	17,737,973	▲19.13%	Steady
12	Brasília International Airport	Brasília	Brazil	16,713,369	▲10.24%	▼2
13	Monterrey International Airport	Monterrey	Mexico	15,623,275	▲15.03%	▲1
14	José María Córdova International Airport	Medellín	Colombia	14,242,523	▲6.15%	▼1
15	Luis Muñoz Marín International Airport	San Juan	Puerto Rico	13,643,686	▲2.99%	Steady
16	Belo Horizonte International Airport	Belo Horizonte	Brazil	13,321,333	▲7.80%	▲2
17	Viracopos International Airport	Campinas	Brazil	12,826,553	▲3.47%	Steady
18	Tijuana International Airport	Tijuana	Mexico	12,650,000	▲0.83%	▼2
19	Ministro Pistarini International Airport	Buenos Aires	Argentina	11,912,433	▲7.49%	Steady
20	Punta Cana International Airport	Punta Cana	Dominican Republic	10,689,693	▲11.91%	▲1
21	Recife/Guararapes–Gilberto Freyre International Airport	Recife	Brazil	9,938,051	▲3.90%	▼1
22	Rafael Núñez International Airport	Cartagena	Colombia	7,756,298	▲3.27%	▲1
23	Los Cabos International Airport	Los Cabos	Mexico	7,529,900	▲0.56%	▲1
24	Salgado Filho Porto Alegre International Airport	Porto Alegre	Brazil	7,512,942	▲93.21%	New entry
25	Salvador Bahia Airport	Salvador	Brazil	7,192,936	▼4.52%	▼3
26	Felipe Angeles International Airport	Mexico City	Mexico	7,079,033	▲12.04%	▲1
27	Puerto Vallarta International Airport	Puerto Vallarta	Mexico	6,947,700	▲2.11%	▼1
28	Alfonso Bonilla Aragón International Airport	Cali	Colombia	6,903,591	▲2.73%	▼2
29	Juan Santamaría International Airport	San José	Costa Rica	6,403,220	▲3.20%	▼1
30	Santos Dumont Airport	Rio de Janeiro	Brazil	6,201,200	▲0.90%	▼1

== 2024 ==
Rank	Airport	City served	Country	Passengers	Annual change	Position change
1	El Dorado International Airport	Bogotá	Colombia	45,802,360	▲16.03%	▲2
2	Mexico City International Airport	Mexico City	Mexico	45,359,485	▼ -6.30%	▼1
3	Guarulhos International Airport	São Paulo	Brazil	43,580,962	▲5.50%	▼1
4	Cancún International Airport	Cancún	Mexico	30,411,520	▼ -7.1%	Steady
5	Jorge Chávez International Airport	Lima	Peru	26,085,244	▲14.77%	▲1
6	Arturo Merino Benítez International Airport	Santiago	Chile	25,840,584	▲12.76%	▼1
7	São Paulo–Congonhas Airport	São Paulo	Brazil	23,130,523	▲4.50%	Steady
8	Tocumen International Airport	Panama City	Panama	19,250,384	▲7.0%	Steady
9	Guadalajara International Airport	Guadalajara	Mexico	17,848,700	▲0.80%	Steady
10	Brasília International Airport	Brasília	Brazil	15,161,041	▲2.02%	▲1
11	Aeroparque Jorge Newbery	Buenos Aires	Argentina	14,890,000	▼ -4.37%	▼1
12	Rio de Janeiro-Galeão International Airport	Rio de Janeiro	Brazil	14,491,987	▲82.37%	▲10
13	José María Córdova International Airport	Medellín	Colombia	13,781,543	▲16.8%	▲3
14	Monterrey International Airport	Monterrey	Mexico	13,581,599	▲0.60%	▼1
15	Luis Muñoz Marín International Airport	San Juan	Puerto Rico	13,247,382	▲8.60%	Steady
16	Tijuana International Airport	Tijuana	Mexico	12,545,800	▼ -4.90%	▼3
17	Viracopos International Airport	Campinas	Brazil	12,395,874	▼ -1.02%	▼3
18	Belo Horizonte International Airport	Belo Horizonte	Brazil	12,357,280	▲17.55%	Steady
19	Ministro Pistarini International Airport	Buenos Aires	Argentina	11,077,000	▲7.47%	Steady
20	Recife/Guararapes–Gilberto Freyre International Airport	Recife	Brazil	9,593,804	▲6.10%	▲1
21	Punta Cana International Airport	Punta Cana	Dominican Republic	9,551,921	▲TBD%	▼1
22	Salvador International Airport	Salvador	Brazil	7,560,840	▲TBD%	▲3
23	Rafael Nunez International Airport	Cartagena	Colombia	7,510,922	▲15.00%	▲5
24	Los Cabos International Airport	Los Cabos	Mexico	7,488,200	▼ -2.90%	▼1
25	Puerto Vallarta International Airport	Puerto Vallarta	Mexico	6,803,500	▲0.20%	▲1
26	Alfonso Bonilla Aragón International Airport	Cali	Colombia	6,716,970	▼TBD%	▲1
27	Felipe Angeles International Airport	Mexico City	Mexico	6,318,091	▲140.50%	New entry
28	Juan Santamaría International Airport	San José	Costa Rica	6,204,906	▲9.20%	▲1
29	Santos Dumont Airport	Rio de Janeiro	Brazil	6,145,799	▼TBD%	▼12
30	Fortaleza International Airport	Fortaleza	Brazil	5,658,227	▲1.0%	Steady

== 2023 ==
Rank	Airport	City served	Country	Passengers	Annual change	Position change
1	Mexico City International Airport	Mexico City	Mexico	48,415,693	▲4.70%	Steady
2	São Paulo/Guarulhos International Airport	Guarulhos	Brazil	41,307,915	▲19.80%	▲1
3	El Dorado International Airport	Bogotá	Colombia	39,483,621	▲11.65%	▼1
4	Cancún International Airport	Cancún	Mexico	32,750,413	▲7.93%	Steady
5	Arturo Merino Benítez International Airport	Santiago	Chile	22,915,885	▲23.74%	▲1
6	Jorge Chávez International Airport	Lima	Peru	22,876,785	▲16.84%	▼1
7	São Paulo–Congonhas Airport	São Paulo	Brazil	22,032,407	▲21.90%	Steady
8	Tocumen International Airport	Panama City	Panama	17,825,465	▲12.97%	Steady
9	Guadalajara International Airport	Guadalajara	Mexico	17,710,200	▲13.48%	Steady
10	Aeroparque Jorge Newbery	Buenos Aires	Argentina	15,566,000	▲22.00%	▲2
11	Brasília International Airport	Brasília	Brazil	14,860,880	▲10.31%	▼1
12	Monterrey International Airport	Monterrey	Mexico	13,326,936	▲21.78%	▲3
13	Tijuana International Airport	Tijuana	Mexico	13,194,900	▲7.06%	Steady
14	Viracopos International Airport	Campinas	Brazil	12,524,219	▲5.73%	Steady
15	Luis Muñoz Marín International Airport	San Juan	Puerto Rico	12,197,553	▲18.30%	▲1
16	José María Córdova International Airport	Medellín	Colombia	11,871,959	▼10.26%	▼5
17	Santos Dumont Airport	Rio de Janeiro	Brazil	11,446,012	▲12.57%	Steady
18	Belo Horizonte International Airport	Belo Horizonte	Brazil	10,512,245	▲10.20%	Steady
19	Ministro Pistarini International Airport	Buenos Aires	Argentina	10,297,000	▲55.45%	▲6
20	Punta Cana International Airport	Punta Cana	Dominican Republic	9,336,501	▲11.59%	Steady
21	Recife/Guararapes–Gilberto Freyre International Airport	Recife	Brazil	9,046,145	▲3.67%	▼2
22	Rio de Janeiro-Galeão International Airport	Rio de Janeiro	Brazil	7,946,583	▲34.80%	▲6
23	Los Cabos International Airport	Los Cabos	Mexico	7,715,600	▲9.92%	Steady
24	Salgado Filho Porto Alegre International Airport	Porto Alegre	Brazil	7,492,886	▲12.61%	Steady
25	Salvador International Airport	Salvador	Brazil	7,279,732	▲11.12%	▲1
26	Puerto Vallarta International Airport	Puerto Vallarta	Mexico	6,790,100	▲9.37%	▲1
27	Alfonso Bonilla Aragón International Airport	Cali	Colombia	6,615,106	▼8.34%	▼6
28	Rafael Nunez International Airport	Cartagena	Colombia	6,338,147	▼9.87%	▼6
29	Juan Santamaría International Airport	San José	Costa Rica	5,682,476	▲21.79%	▲3
30	Fortaleza International Airport	Fortaleza	Brazil	5,589,563	▼ -3.26%	Steady

== 2022 ==
Rank	Airport	City served	Country	Passengers	Annual change	Position change
1	Mexico City International Airport	Mexico City	Mexico	46,258,521	▲28.29%	Steady
2	El Dorado International Airport	Bogotá	Colombia	35,362,529	▲55.35%	▲2
3	São Paulo/Guarulhos International Airport	Guarulhos	Brazil	34,480,706	▲42.66%	▼1
4	Cancún International Airport	Cancún	Mexico	30,342,961	▲35.95%	▼1
5	Jorge Chávez International Airport	Lima	Peru	19,579,837	▲74.57%	▲1
6	Arturo Merino Benítez International Airport	Santiago	Chile	18,519,667	▲86.74%	▲3
7	São Paulo–Congonhas Airport	Guarulhos	Brazil	18,073,610	▲86.76%	▲5
8	Tocumen International Airport	Panama City	Panama	15,779,103	▲72.19%	▲5
9	Guadalajara International Airport	Guadalajara	Mexico	15,606,600	▲27.48%	▼4
10	Brasília International Airport	Brasília	Brazil	13,471,797	▲28.31%	▼3
11	José María Córdova International Airport	Medellín	Colombia	13,214,155	▲66.92%	▲4
12	Aeroparque Jorge Newbery	Buenos Aires	Argentina	12,833,254	▲183.40%	▲11
13	Tijuana International Airport	Tijuana	Mexico	12,324,600	▲27.35%	▼2
14	Viracopos International Airport	Campinas	Brazil	11,845,500	▲17.92%	▼6
15	Monterrey International Airport	Monterrey	Mexico	10,943,186	▲32.33%	▼1
16	Luis Muñoz Marín International Airport	San Juan	Puerto Rico	10,310,990	▲6.47%	▼6
17	Santos Dumont Airport	Rio de Janeiro	Brazil	10,167,951	▲49.54%	▲1
18	Belo Horizonte International Airport	Belo Horizonte	Brazil	9,537,289	▲38.22%	▼1
19	Recife/Guararapes–Gilberto Freyre International Airport	Recife	Brazil	8,725,495	▲15.98%	▼3
20	Punta Cana International Airport	Punta Cana	Dominican Republic	8,366,844	▲89.69%	▲5
21	Alfonso Bonilla Aragón International Airport	Cali	Colombia	7,217,373	▲38.48%	Steady
22	Rafael Núñez International Airport	Cartagena	Colombia	7,087,788	▲59.07%	▲2
23	Los Cabos International Airport	Los Cabos	Mexico	7,019,300	▲26.48%	▼4
24	Salgado Filho Porto Alegre International Airport	Porto Alegre	Brazil	6,654,062	▲37.49%	▼2
25	Ministro Pistarini International Airport	Buenos Aires	Argentina	6,628,352	▲113.28%	▲6
26	Salvador International Airport	Salvador	Brazil	6,551,162	▲19.42%	▼6
27	Puerto Vallarta International Airport	Puerto Vallarta	Mexico	6,208,700	▲22.90%	▼1
28	Rio de Janeiro-Galeão International Airport	Rio de Janeiro	Brazil	5,895,257	▲50.91%	Steady
29	Fortaleza International Airport	Fortaleza	Brazil	5,778,038	▼45.37%	▼2
30	Afonso Pena International Airport	Curitiba	Brazil	4,885,282	▲56.98%	Steady

== 2021 ==
Rank	Airport	City served	Country	Passengers	Annual change	Position change
1	Mexico City International Airport	Mexico City	Mexico	36,056,614	▲64.03%	Steady
2	São Paulo/Guarulhos International Airport	Guarulhos	Brazil	24,167,495	▲18.92%	Steady
3	Cancún International Airport	Cancún	Mexico	22,318,467	▲82.06%	Steady
4	El Dorado International Airport	Bogotá	Colombia	22,091,102	▲104.24%	Steady
5	Guadalajara International Airport	Guadalajara	Mexico	12,243,000	▲50.67%	▲1
6	Jorge Chávez International Airport	Lima	Peru	11,215,750	▲48.22%	▲2
7	Brasília International Airport	Brasília	Brazil	10,499,097	▲33.78%	Steady
8	Viracopos International Airport	Campinas	Brazil	10,045,361	▲49.73%	▲2
9	Arturo Merino Benítez International Airport	Santiago	Chile	9,916,293	▲16.90%	▼4
10	Luis Muñoz Marín International Airport	San Juan	Puerto Rico	9,684,227	▲99.87%	▲4
11	Tijuana International Airport	Tijuana	Mexico	9,677,900	▲53.21%	Steady
12	São Paulo–Congonhas Airport	São Paulo	Brazil	9,677,569	▲38.96%	▼3
13	Tocumen International Airport	Panama City	Panama	9,163,998	▲102.44%	▲5
14	Monterrey International Airport	Monterrey	Mexico	8,269,834	▲65.69%	▼2
15	José María Córdova International Airport	Medellín	Colombia	7,916,646	▲156.57%	▲8
16	Recife/Guararapes–Gilberto Freyre International Airport	Recife	Brazil	7,523,046	▲55.53%	Steady
17	Belo Horizonte International Airport	Belo Horizonte	Brazil	6,899,849	▲43.39%	▼2
18	Santos Dumont Airport	Rio de Janeiro	Brazil	6,799,614	▲37.15%	▼5
19	Los Cabos International Airport	Los Cabos	Mexico	5,549,600	▲81.11%	▲5
20	Salvador International Airport	Salvador	Brazil	5,486,014	▲42.83%	▼1
21	Alfonso Bonilla Aragón International Airport	Cali	Colombia	5,211,765	▲166.45%	▲9
22	Salgado Filho Porto Alegre International Airport	Porto Alegre	Brazil	4,839,594	▲35.90%	▼2
23	Aeroparque Jorge Newbery	Buenos Aires	Argentina	4,519,650	▲92.54%	▲4
24	Rafael Núñez International Airport	Cartagena	Colombia	4,455,787	▲137.05%	▲7
25	Punta Cana International Airport	Punta Cana	Dominican Republic	4,410,838	▲117.60%	▲4

== 2020 ==
Rank	Airport	City served	Country	Passengers	Annual change	Position change
1	Mexico City International Airport	Mexico City	Mexico	21,981,711	▼56.31%	Steady
2	São Paulo/Guarulhos International Airport	Guarulhos	Brazil	20,322,520	▼52.74%	Steady
3	Cancún International Airport	Cancún	Mexico	12,259,148	▼51.89%	▲1
4	El Dorado International Airport	Bogotá	Colombia	10,816,372	▼69.09%	▼1
5	Arturo Merino Benítez International Airport	Santiago	Chile	8,527,737	▼65.38%	▲1
6	Guadalajara International Airport	Guadalajara	Mexico	8,125,600	▼45.27%	▲4
7	Brasília International Airport	Brasília	Brazil	7,848,297	▼53.08%	▲1
8	Jorge Chávez International Airport	Lima	Peru	7,566,704	▼70.24%	▼3
9	São Paulo–Congonhas Airport	Guarulhos	Brazil	6,964,390	▼69.29%	▼2
10	Viracopos International Airport	Campinas	Brazil	6,709,061	▼36.62%	▲6
11	Tijuana International Airport	Tijuana	Mexico	6,316,000	▼29.24%	▲9
12	Monterrey International Airport	Monterrey	Mexico	4,994,170	▼55.32%	▲2
13	Santos Dumont Airport	Rio de Janeiro	Brazil	4,957,973	▼45.46%	▲6
14	Luis Muñoz Marín International Airport	San Juan	Puerto Rico	4,845,353	▼48.72%	▲3
15	Recife/Guararapes–Gilberto Freyre International Airport	Recife	Brazil	4,836,890	▼44.49%	▲6
16	Belo Horizonte International Airport	Belo Horizonte	Brazil	4,811,942	▼56.94%	▼1
17	Rio de Janeiro/Galeão International Airport	Rio de Janeiro	Brazil	4,635,123	▼65.69%	▼6
18	Tocumen International Airport	Panama City	Panama	4,526,663	▼72.70%	▼9
19	Salvador International Airport	Salvador	Brazil	3,840,940	▼50.67%	▲4
20	Salgado Filho International Airport	Porto Alegre	Brazil	3,840,940	▼56.39%	▲2
21	Ministro Pistarini International Airport	Buenos Aires	Argentina	3,305,171	▼73.79%	▼9
22	Fortaleza Airport	Fortaleza	Brazil	3,156,418	▼55.14%	▲2
23	José María Córdova International Airport	Medellín	Colombia	3,085,601	▼66.48%	▼5
24	Los Cabos International Airport	Los Cabos	Mexico	3,064,200	▼45.37%	▲5
25	Puerto Vallarta International Airport	Puerto Vallarta	Mexico	2,536,100	▼49.80%	▲7

== 2019 ==
Rank	Airport	City served	Country	Passengers	Annual change	Position change
1	Mexico City International Airport	Mexico City	Mexico	50,308,049	▲5.47%	Steady
2	São Paulo-Guarulhos International Airport	São Paulo	Brazil	43,002,419	▲1.83%	Steady
3	El Dorado International Airport	Bogotá	Colombia	34,989,785	▲6.95%	Steady
4	Cancún International Airport	Cancún	Mexico	25,481,989	▲1.11%	Steady
5	Jorge Chávez International Airport	Lima	Peru	25,402,742	▲6.82%	Steady
6	Arturo Merino Benítez International Airport	Santiago	Chile	24,630,742	▲5.60%	Steady
7	São Paulo-Congonhas Airport	São Paulo	Brazil	22,681,392	▲3.28%	Steady
8	Brasília International Airport	Brasília	Brazil	16,727,177	▼6.23%	Steady
9	Tocumen International Airport	Panama City	Panama	16,582,601	▲2.09%	Steady
10	Guadalajara International Airport	Guadalajara	Mexico	14,846,329	▲3.45%	▲1
11	Rio de Janeiro-Galeão International Airport	Rio de Janeiro	Brazil	13,508,309	▼9.98%	▼1
12	Ministro Pistarini International Airport	Buenos Aires	Argentina	12,609,270	▲12.57%	▲1
13	Aeroparque Jorge Newbery	Buenos Aires	Argentina	12,298,969	▼7.98%	▼1
14	Monterrey International Airport	Monterrey	Mexico	11,176,555	▲4.13%	Steady
15	Tancredo Neves International Airport	Belo Horizonte	Brazil	11,173,878	▲5.50%	Steady
16	Viracopos International Airport	Campinas	Brazil	10,585,018	▲14.77%	Steady
17	Luis Muñoz Marín International Airport	San Juan	Puerto Rico	9,448,253	▲12.83%	▲1
18	José María Córdova International Airport	Medellín	Colombia	9,205,009	▲14.54%	▲3
19	Santos Dumont Airport	Rio de Janeiro	Brazil	9,091,258	▼0.81%	▼2
20	Tijuana International Airport	Tijuana	Mexico	8,925,873	▲13.92%	▲4
21	Recife/Guararapes–Gilberto Freyre International Airport	Recife	Brazil	8,714,119	▲3.74%	▼2
22	Salgado Filho International Airport	Porto Alegre	Brazil	8,298,205	▼0.04%	▼2
23	Deputado Luís Eduardo Magalhães International Airport	Salvador	Brazil	7,786,582	▼2.88%	▼1
24	Fortaleza Airport	Fortaleza	Brazil	7,218,697	▲9.14%	▲1
25	Punta Cana International Airport	Punta Cana	Dominican Republic	7,137,882	▼9.49%	▼2

== 2018 ==
Rank	Airport	City served	Country	Passengers	Annual change	Position change
1	Mexico City International Airport	Mexico City	Mexico	47,700,547	▲6.63%	Steady
2	São Paulo-Guarulhos International Airport	Guarulhos	Brazil	42,831,981	▲13.41%	Steady
3	El Dorado International Airport	Bogotá	Colombia	32,716,468	▲5.57%	Steady
4	Cancún International Airport	Cancún	Mexico	25,202,016	▲6.78%	Steady
5	Jorge Chávez International Airport	Lima	Peru	23,659,196	▲7.61%	Steady
6	Arturo Merino Benítez International Airport	Santiago	Chile	23,324,306	▲8.86%	▲1
7	São Paulo-Congonhas Airport	Guarulhos	Brazil	21,546,480	▼1.43%	▼1
8	Brasília International Airport	Brasília	Brazil	17,622,873	▲4.10%	Steady
9	Tocumen International Airport	Panama City	Panama	16,242,679	▲4.01%	▲1
10	Rio de Janeiro-Galeão International Airport	Rio de Janeiro	Brazil	15,005,304	▼7.62%	▼1
11	Guadalajara International Airport	Guadalajara	Mexico	14,351,600	▲12.05%	▲1
12	Aeroparque Jorge Newbery	Buenos Aires	Argentina	13,363,000	▼3.15%	▼1
13	Ministro Pistarini International Airport	Buenos Aires	Argentina	11,204,000	▲8.49%	Steady
14	Monterrey International Airport	Monterrey	Mexico	10,733,186	▲9.84%	▲1
15	Tancredo Neves International Airport	Belo Horizonte	Brazil	10,591,138	▲4.20%	▼1
16	Viracopos International Airport	Campinas	Brazil	9,223,074	▼1.17%	Steady
17	Santos Dumont Airport	Rio de Janeiro	Brazil	9,108,564	▼1.50%	Steady
18	Luis Muñoz Marín International Airport	San Juan	Puerto Rico	8,373,679	▼0.79%	Steady
19	Recife/Guararapes–Gilberto Freyre International Airport	Recife	Brazil	8,399,935	▲4.91%	Steady
20	Salgado Filho International Airport	Porto Alegre	Brazil	8,301,172	▲3.61%	Steady
21	José María Córdova International Airport	Medellín	Colombia	8,036,411	▲5.47%	▲1
22	Deputado Luís Eduardo Magalhães International Airport	Salvador	Brazil	8,001,175	▲3.64%	▼1
23	Punta Cana International Airport	Punta Cana	Dominican Republic	7,886,586	▲7.57%	Steady
24	Tijuana International Airport	Tijuana	Mexico	7,835,100	▲10.30%	Steady
25	Fortaleza Airport	Fortaleza	Brazil	6,614,227	▲11.5%%	Steady

== 2017 ==
Rank	Airport	City served	Country	Passengers	Annual change	Position change
1	Mexico City International Airport	Mexico City	Mexico	44,732,418	▲7.25%	Steady
2	São Paulo-Guarulhos International Airport	Guarulhos	Brazil	37,765,898	▲3.22%	Steady
3	El Dorado International Airport	Bogotá	Colombia	30,989,932	▼0.16%	Steady
4	Cancún International Airport	Cancún	Mexico	23,601,509	▲10.21%	Steady
5	Jorge Chávez International Airport	Lima	Peru	22,046,042	▲14.07%	▲1
6	São Paulo-Congonhas Airport	São Paulo	Brazil	21,859,453	▲5.01%	▼1
7	Arturo Merino Benítez International Airport	Santiago	Chile	21,426,871	▲13.11%	Steady
8	Brasília International Airport	Brasília	Brazil	16,912,680	▼5.76%	Steady
9	Rio de Janeiro-Galeão International Airport	Rio de Janeiro	Brazil	16,243,253	▲0.87%	Steady
10	Tocumen International Airport	Panama City	Panama	15,616,065	▲5.93%	Steady
11	Aeroparque Jorge Newbery	Buenos Aires	Argentina	13,797,710	▲18.27%	Steady
12	Guadalajara International Airport	Guadalajara	Mexico	12,808,000	▲12.39%	Steady
13	Ministro Pistarini International Airport	Buenos Aires	Argentina	10,327,203	▲5.05%	Steady
14	Tancredo Neves International Airport	Belo Horizonte	Brazil	10,164,077	▲5.49%	Steady
15	Monterrey International Airport	Monterrey	Mexico	9,771,630	▲6.46%	▲1

== 2016 ==
Rank	Airport	City served	Country	Passengers	Annual change	Position change
1	Mexico City International Airport	Mexico City	Mexico	41,710,254	▲8.53%	▲1
2	São Paulo-Guarulhos International Airport	São Paulo	Brazil	36,596,326	▼6.13%	▼1
3	El Dorado International Airport	Bogotá	Colombia	31,041,841	▲3.62%	Steady
4	Cancún International Airport	Cancún	Mexico	21,415,795	▲9.28%	▲1
5	São Paulo-Congonhas Airport	São Paulo	Brazil	20,816,957	▲7.97%	▲1
6	Jorge Chávez International Airport	Lima	Peru	19,286,158	▲9.73%	▲1
7	Arturo Merino Benítez International Airport	Santiago	Chile	18,943,231	▲9.94%	▲1
8	Brasília International Airport	Brasília	Brazil	17,947,153	▼9.46%	▼4
9	Rio de Janeiro-Galeão International Airport	Rio de Janeiro	Brazil	16,103,011	▼4.95%	Steady
10	Tocumen International Airport	Panama City	Panama	14,741,937	▲9.73%	Steady
11	Aeroparque Jorge Newbery	Buenos Aires	Argentina	11,666,528	▲7.76%	▲1
12	Guadalajara International Airport	Guadalajara	Mexico	11,395,800	▲16.78%	▲2
13	Ministro Pistarini International Airport	Buenos Aires	Argentina	9,831,127	▲7.70%	▲3
14	Tancredo Neves International Airport	Belo Horizonte	Brazil	9,635,314	▼14.76%	▼3
15	Viracopos International Airport	Campinas	Brazil	9,325,252	▼9.68%	▼2

== 2015 ==
Rank	Airport	City served	Country	Passengers	Annual change	Position change
1	São Paulo-Guarulhos International Airport	Guarulhos	Brazil	38,984,587	▼1.39%	Steady
2	Mexico City International Airport	Mexico City	Mexico	38,433,078	▲12.20%	Steady
3	El Dorado International Airport	Bogotá	Colombia	29,956,551	▲9.20%	Steady
4	Brasília International Airport	Brasília	Brazil	19,821,796	▲9.23%	Steady
5	Cancún International Airport	Cancún	Mexico	19,596,485	▲12.3%	▲1
6	São Paulo-Congonhas Airport	São Paulo	Brazil	19,279,644	▲6.31%	▼1
7	Jorge Chávez International Airport	Lima	Peru	17,575,919	▲8.69%	▲1
8	Arturo Merino Benítez International Airport	Santiago	Chile	17,230,567	▲7.23%	▲1
9	Rio de Janeiro-Galeão International Airport	Rio de Janeiro	Brazil	16,942,229	▼2.17%	▼2
10	Tocumen International Airport	Panama City	Panama	13,434,673	▲5.10%	Steady

== 2014 ==
Rank	Airport	City served	Country	Passengers	Annual change	Position change
1	São Paulo-Guarulhos International Airport	São Paulo	Brazil	39,573,000	▲8.53%	Steady
2	Mexico City International Airport	Mexico City	Mexico	34,255,739	▲8.62%	Steady
3	El Dorado International Airport	Bogotá	Colombia	27,430,266	▲9.67%	Steady
4	Brasília International Airport	Brasília	Brazil	18,146,405	▲10.04%	▲2
5	São Paulo-Congonhas Airport	São Paulo	Brazil	18,134,768	▲5.93%	▼1
6	Cancún International Airport	Cancún	Mexico	17,455,353	▲9.35%	▲1
7	Rio de Janeiro-Galeão International Airport	Rio de Janeiro	Brazil	17,261,873	▲0.85%	▼2
8	Jorge Chávez International Airport	Lima	Peru	16,170,035	▲8.45%	▲1
9	Arturo Merino Benítez International Airport	Santiago	Chile	16,068,242	▲4.93%	▼1
10	Tocumen International Airport	Panama City	Panama	12,782,167	▲64.20%	▲9

== 2013 ==
Rank	Airport	City served	Country	Passengers	Annual change	Position change
1	São Paulo-Guarulhos International Airport	São Paulo	Brazil	36,460,923	▲13.31%	Steady
2	Mexico City International Airport	Mexico City	Mexico	31,534,638	▲6.93%	Steady
3	El Dorado International Airport	Bogotá	Colombia	25,009,483	▲11.02%	Steady
4	São Paulo-Congonhas Airport	São Paulo	Brazil	17,119,530	▲2.04%	▲1
5	Rio de Janeiro-Galeão International Airport	Rio de Janeiro	Brazil	17,115,368	▼2.15%	▼1
6	Brasília International Airport	Brasília	Brazil	16,489,987	▲5.26%	Steady
7	Cancún International Airport	Cancún	Mexico	15,962,162	▲10.36%	Steady
8	Arturo Merino Benítez International Airport	Santiago	Chile	15,312,649	▲8.07%	Steady
9	Jorge Chávez International Airport	Lima	Peru	14,908,772	▲11.84%	Steady
10	Simón Bolívar International Airport	Caracas	Venezuela	11,230,000	▲7.66%	Steady

== 2012 ==
Rank	Airport	City served	Country	Passengers	Annual change	Position change
1	São Paulo-Guarulhos International Airport	Guarulhos	Brazil	32,177,594	▲9.24%	Steady
2	Mexico City International Airport	Mexico City	Mexico	29,491,553	▲11.84%	Steady
3	El Dorado International Airport	Bogotá	Colombia	22,525,873	▲10.27%	Steady
4	Rio de Janeiro-Galeão International Airport	Rio de Janeiro	Brazil	17,491,744	▲17.08%	▲2
5	São Paulo-Congonhas Airport	São Paulo	Brazil	16,775,785	▲0.11%	▼1
6	Brasília International Airport	Brasília	Brazil	15,665,045	▲3.2%	▼1
7	Cancún International Airport	Cancún	Mexico	14,463,435	▲11.1%	Steady
8	Arturo Merino Benítez International Airport	Santiago	Chile	14,168,282	▲17.3%	Steady
9	Jorge Chávez International Airport	Lima	Peru	13,330,290	▲11.7%	Steady
10	Simón Bolívar International Airport	Caracas	Venezuela	10,430,243	▲9.67%	▲1
11	Tancredo Neves International Airport	Belo Horizonte	Brazil	10,390,396	▲9.05%	▼1
12	Santos Dumont Airport	Rio de Janeiro	Brazil	9,002,863	▲5.43%	Steady
13	Ministro Pistarini International Airport	Buenos Aires	Argentina	8,880,289	▲7.27%	▲1
14	Viracopos International Airport	Campinas / São Paulo	Brazil	8,858,380	▲17.04%	▲4
15	Jorge Newbery Airport	Buenos Aires	Argentina	8,849,465	▲8.54%	▲1
16	Deputado Luís Eduardo Magalhães International Airport	Salvador	Brazil	8,811,540	▲4.96%	▼2
17	Luis Muñoz Marín International Airport	San Juan	Puerto Rico	8,448,172	▲5.7%	▼4
18	Salgado Filho International Airport	Porto Alegre	Brazil	8,261,355	▲5.45%	▼1
19	Guadalajara International Airport	Guadalajara	Mexico	7,436,400	▲3.3%	Steady
20	Afonso Pena International Airport	Curitiba	Brazil	6,828,334	▼2.03%	Steady

== 2011 ==
Rank	Airport	City served	Country	Passengers	Annual change	Position change
1	São Paulo-Guarulhos International Airport	Guarulhos	Brazil	30,003,428	▲11.75%	Steady
2	Mexico City International Airport	Mexico City	Mexico	26,368,861	▲9.28%	Steady
3	El Dorado International Airport	Bogotá	Colombia	20,427,603	▲7.89%	Steady
4	Congonhas-São Paulo Airport	São Paulo	Brazil	16,756,452	▲8.11%	Steady
5	Brasília International Airport	Brasília	Brazil	15,398,737	▲7.18%	Steady
6	Rio de Janeiro-Galeão International Airport	Rio de Janeiro	Brazil	14,952,830	▲22.27%	▲1
7	Cancún International Airport	Cancún	Mexico	13,022,481	▲4.69%	▼1
8	Arturo Merino Benítez International Airport	Santiago	Chile	12,989,318	▲17.40%	Steady
9	Jorge Chávez International Airport	Lima	Peru	11,904,553	▲15.82%	Steady
10	Tancredo Neves International Airport	Belo Horizonte	Brazil	9,639,332	▲32.75%	▲6
11	Simón Bolívar International Airport	Maiquetia	Venezuela	9,509,874	▲7.69%	▼1
12	Santos Dumont Airport	Rio de Janeiro	Brazil	8,515,021	▲8.85%	▲1
13	Luis Muñoz Marín International Airport	San Juan	Puerto Rico	8,423,102	▼0.3%	▼1
14	Deputado Luís Eduardo Magalhães International Airport	Salvador	Brazil	8,310,651	▲7.98%	▲1
15	Ministro Pistarini International Airport	Buenos Aires	Argentina	8,278,159	▼5.79%	▼3
16	Jorge Newbery Airport	Buenos Aires	Argentina	8,162,809	▲7.5%	Steady
17	Salgado Filho International Airport	Porto Alegre	Brazil	7,834,312	▲17.3%	▲1
18	Viracopos International Airport	Campinas	Brazil	7,568,384	▲39.3%	▲3
19	Guadalajara International Airport	Guadalajara	Mexico	7,190,998	▲3.4%	▼2
20	Afonso Pena International Airport	Curitiba	Brazil	6,969,484	▲20.7%	▼1

== 2010 ==
Rank	Airport	City served	Country	Passengers	Annual change	Position change
1	São Paulo-Guarulhos International Airport	Guarulhos	Brazil	26,849,185	▲23.5%	▲1
2	Mexico City International Airport	Mexico City	Mexico	24,130,535	▼0.004%	▼1
3	El Dorado International Airport	Bogotá	Colombia	18,934,203	▲27.1%	Steady
4	Congonhas-São Paulo Airport	São Paulo	Brazil	15,499,462	▲13.1%	Steady
5	Brasília International Airport	Brasília	Brazil	14,367,061	▲17.6%	Steady
6	Cancún International Airport	Cancún	Mexico	12,439,266	▲11.3%	▲1
7	Rio de Janeiro-Galeão International Airport	Rio de Janeiro	Brazil	12,229,513	▲3.4%	▼1
8	Arturo Merino Benítez International Airport	Santiago	Chile	11,064,487	▲22.6%	Steady
9	Jorge Chávez International Airport	Lima	Peru	10,278,493	▲17.0%	Steady
10	Simón Bolívar International Airport	Maiquetia	Venezuela	8,830,688	▲0.65%	Steady
11	Ministro Pistarini International Airport	Buenos Aires	Argentina	8,786,807	▲10.87%	▲1
12	Luis Muñoz Marín International Airport	San Juan	Puerto Rico	8,491,257	▲2.98%	▼1
13	Santos Dumont Airport	Rio de Janeiro	Brazil	7,822,848	▲53.4%	▲7
14	Deputado Luís Eduardo Magalhães International Airport	Salvador	Brazil	7,696,307	▲9.13%	▼1
15	Jorge Newbery Airport	Buenos Aires	Argentina	7,558,149	▲16.47%	▼1
16	Tancredo Neves International Airport	Belo Horizonte	Brazil	7,261,064	▲29.26%	Steady
17	Guadalajara International Airport	Guadalajara	Mexico	6,953,900	▲7.8%	▼2
18	Salgado Filho International Airport	Porto Alegre	Brazil	6,676,216	▲19.1%	▼1
19	Guararapes International Airport	Recife	Brazil	5,958,982	▲13.49%	▼1
20	Afonso Pena International Airport	Curitiba	Brazil	5,774,155	▲18.97%	▲1

== 2009 ==
Rank	Airport	Location	Passengers	Annual change	Position change
1	Mexico City International Airport	Mexico City	24,243,056	▼7.5%	Steady
2	São Paulo-Guarulhos International Airport	Guarulhos	21,727,642	▲6.5%	Steady
3	El Dorado International Airport	Bogotá	14,899,199	▲10.7%	▲1
4	Congonhas-São Paulo Airport	São Paulo	13,699,657	▲0.2%	▼1
5	Brasília International Airport	Brasília	12,213,825	▲16.9%	▲2
6	Rio de Janeiro-Galeão International Airport	Rio de Janeiro	11,828,656	▲10.3%	Steady
7	Cancún International Airport	Cancún	11,174,908	▼11.6%	▼2
8	Arturo Merino Benítez International Airport	Santiago	9,024,611	▲0.1%	▲1
9	Jorge Chávez International Airport	Lima	8,786,973	▲6.0%	▲2
10	Simón Bolívar International Airport	Maiquetia	8,773,461	▼2.2%	Steady
11	Luis Muñoz Marín International Airport	San Juan	8,245,895	▼12.1%	▼3
12	Ministro Pistarini International Airport	Buenos Aires	7,924,759	▼1.1%	Steady
13	Deputado Luís Eduardo Magalhães International Airport	Salvador	7,052,720	▲17.2%	▲2
14	Jorge Newbery Airport	Buenos Aires	6,489,066	▲14.1%	▲2
15	Guadalajara International Airport	Guadalajara	6,453,100	▼10.2%	▼2
16	Tancredo Neves International Airport	Belo Horizonte	5,617,171	▲8.2%	▲1
17	Salgado Filho International Airport	Porto Alegre	5,607,703	▲13.7%	▲1
18	Guararapes International Airport	Recife	5,250,565	▲12.2%	▲1
19	Monterrey International Airport	Monterrey	5,199,895	▼21.0%	▼5
20	Santos Dumont Airport	Rio de Janeiro	5,099,643	▲40.5%	▲1

== 2008 ==
Rank	Airport	Location	Passengers	Annual change
1	Mexico City International Airport	Mexico City	26,210,217	▲1.3%
2	São Paulo-Guarulhos International Airport	São Paulo	20,400,304	▲8.54%
3	Congonhas-São Paulo Airport	São Paulo	13,672,301	▼10.43%
4	El Dorado International Airport	Bogotá	13,456,331	▲4.90%
5	Cancún International Airport	Cancún	12,646,512	▲11.5%
6	Rio de Janeiro-Galeão International Airport	Rio de Janeiro	10,717,120	▲3.52%
7	Brasília International Airport	Brasília	10,443,393	▼6.08%
8	Luis Muñoz Marín International Airport	San Juan	9,378,924	▼9.9%
9	Arturo Merino Benítez International Airport	Santiago	9,017,718	▲7.38%
10	Simón Bolívar International Airport	Maiquetia	8,975,897	▲7.4%
11	Jorge Chávez International Airport	Lima	8,285,688	▲10.4%
12	Ministro Pistarini International Airport	Buenos Aires	8,012,794	▲7.01%
13	Guadalajara International Airport	Guadalajara	7,193,200	▼1.9%
14	Monterrey International Airport	Monterrey	6,586,200	▲0.4%
15	Deputado Luís Eduardo Magalhães International Airport	Salvador	6,042,307	▲4.2%

== See also ==
- List of the busiest airports in Mexico
- List of the busiest airports in Central America
- List of the busiest airports in the Caribbean
- List of the busiest airports in North America
- List of the busiest airports in South America
- List of busiest airports by passenger traffic
