= Juami River =

River in Amazonas, Brazil

- Juami River (Brazil)

Location
- Country: Brazil

Physical characteristics
- Mouth
  - location: Japurá, Amazonas, Brazil
  - coordinates: 1.762177°S 67.593451°W

Basin features
- River system: Amazon

Juami River is a river of Amazonas state in north-western Brazil.

Juami River is a black water river, a tributary of the white water Japurá River, and runs through the Amazon plain. The entire basin of the Juami River is contained within the Juami-Japurá Ecological Station. The basin has altitudes that range from 45 to 450 metres (148 to 1,476 ft) above sea level.

== See also ==
- List of rivers of Amazonas
