= Banankoro, Beyla =

Banankoro
- Town
- Location in Guinea
- Coordinates: 9°10′51″N 9°18′11″W
- Country: Guinea
- Region: Nzérékoré Region
- Prefecture: Beyla Prefecture
- Time zone: UTC+0 (Guinea Standard Time)

Banankoro is a town in the Beyla Prefecture the Nzérékoré Region of eastern Guinea. It is located to the west of the iron ore deposits at Simandou.

== Transport ==
The town is served by Gbenko Airport.
