= Nzérékoré Airport =

Airport in Nzérékoré, Guinea

Nzérékoré Airport Aéroport de Nzérékoré (French)
- IATA: NZE; ICAO: GUNZ

Summary
- Airport type: Public
- Serves: Nzérékoré, Guinea
- Elevation AMSL: 1,657 ft / 505 m
- Coordinates: 7°48′50″N 8°42′10″W

Map
- Location of the airport in Guinea

Runways
Direction	Length		Surface
Direction	m	ft	Surface
18/36	1,650	5,413	Dirt
- Source: GCM SkyVector

Nzérékoré Airport (IATA: NZE, ICAO: GUNZ) is an airport serving Nzérékoré in Guinea. The airport is in the countryside, 12 kilometres (7.5 mi) northeast of the city.

== See also ==
- Transport in Guinea
- List of airports in Guinea
