= List of airports by IATA code: Q =

| IATA | ICAO | Airport name | Location served | Time | DST | | | | |
-QA-
| QAQ | LIAP | L'Aquila–Preturo Airport | L'Aquila, Abruzzo, Italy | | | | | | |
-QB-
| QBC | CYBD | Bella Coola Airport | British Columbia, Canada | | | | | | |
| QBH | YMHL | Mount Holland Airport | Mount Holland, Western Australia, Australia | | | | | | |
-QC-
| QCY | EGXC | RAF Coningsby | Coningsby, England, United Kingdom | | | | | | |
-QH-
| QHU | EDXJ | Husum Schwesing Airport | Husum, Schleswig-Holstein, Germany | | | QJR | EDNR | Regensburg Oberhub Flugplatz | Regensburg, Germany |
-QL-
| QLR | LPMR | Monte Real Air Base | Monte Real, Portugal | | | | | | |
-QO-
| QOW | DNIM | Sam Mbakwe Airport | Owerri, Nigeria | | | | | | |
-QP-
| QPG | WSAP | Paya Lebar Air Base | Singapore | | | | | | |
-QR-
| QRA | FAGM | Rand Airport | Johannesburg, South Africa | | | | | | |
| QRC | SCRG | Rancagua de la Independencia Airport | Rancagua, Chile | | | | | | |
| QRO | MMQT | Querétaro Intercontinental Airport | Querétaro City, Querétaro, Mexico | | | | | | |
| QRW | DNSU | Warri Airport (Osubi Airport) | Warri, Nigeria | | | | | | |
-QS-
| QSC | SDSC | Mário Pereira Lopes Airport | São Carlos, São Paulo, Brazil | | | | | | |
| QSF | DAAS | Ain Arnat Airport | Sétif, Algeria | | | | | | |
| QSR | LIRI | Salerno Costa d'Amalfi Airport (Pontecagnano Airport) | Salerno, Campania, Italy | | | | | | |
| QSZ | ZWSC | Shache Airport | Shache, Xinjiang, China | UTC+08:00 | | | | | |
-QU-
| QUB | HLUB | Ubari Airport | Ubari, Libya | | | | | | |
| QUG | EGHR | Chichester/Goodwood Airfield | Chichester, England, United Kingdom | | | | | | |
| QUO | DNAI | Akwa Ibom International Airport | Uyo, Nigeria | | | | | | |
| QUY | EGUY | RAF Wyton | Wyton, England, United Kingdom | | | | | | |
-QW-
| QWG | | Wilgrove Air Park (FAA: 8A6) (closed June 2020) | Charlotte, North Carolina, United States | | | | | | |
