= Tata Airport =

Airport in Guinea

Tata Airport Aéroport de Tata (French)
- IATA: LEK; ICAO: GULB

Summary
- Airport type: Public
- Serves: Labé
- Elevation AMSL: 3,396 ft / 1,035 m
- Coordinates: 11°20′15″N 12°17′25″W

Map
- Location of the airport in Guinea

Runways
Direction	Length		Surface
Direction	m	ft	Surface
06/24	3,000	9,843	Dirt
- Source: GCM Google Maps

Tata Airport (IATA: LEK, ICAO: GULB) is an airport serving Labé in Guinea.

The airport was formerly paved, but is now entirely grass/dirt due to plans to repave the entire runway that never occurred.

The Labe non-directional beacon (Ident: LB) is located on the field.

There are currently no scheduled passenger flights to Labé, but the airport received passengers up until the mid-2000s through regional carriers: Air Guinee and Union des Transports Africains (West Coast Airways).

== See also ==
- Transport in Guinea
- List of airports in Guinea
