= Japurá =

Municipality of Amazonas, Brazil

- Municipality
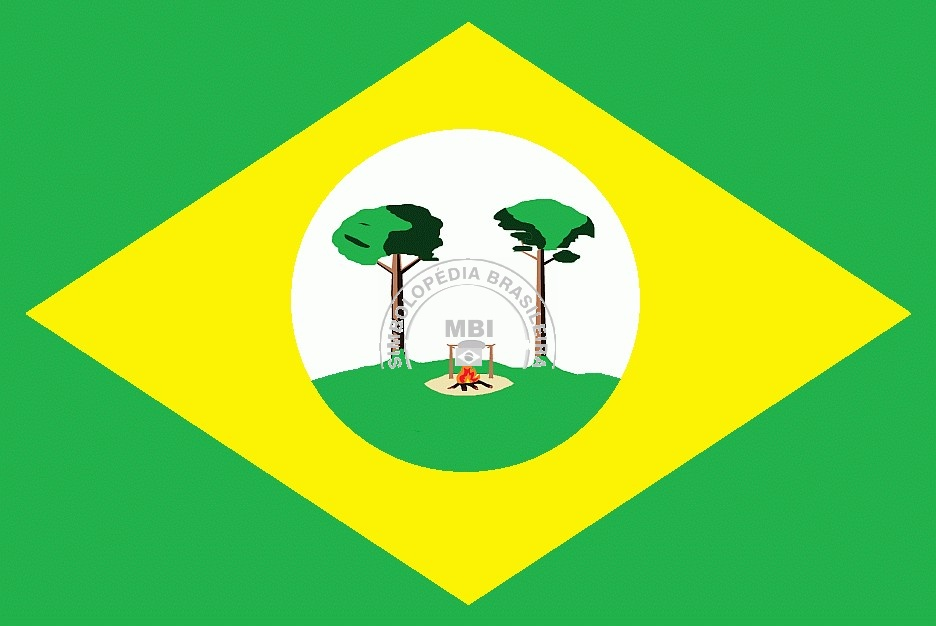
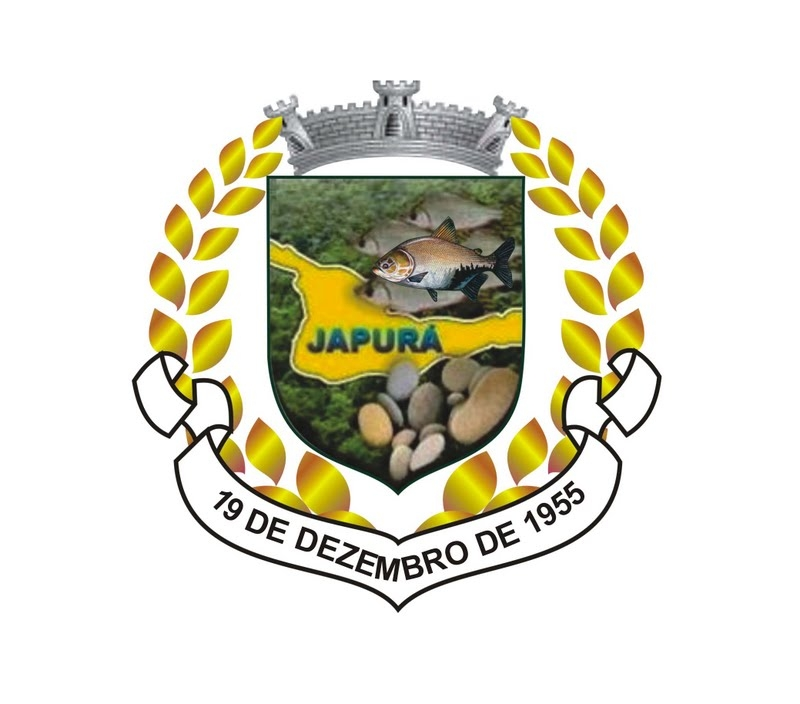
- Flag Coat of arms

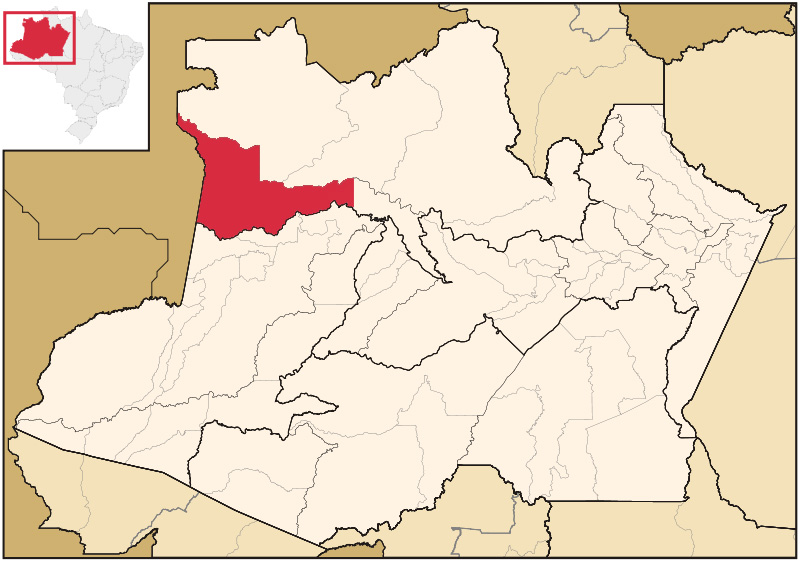
- Location of the municipality inside Amazonas

- Location in Brazil
- Coordinates: 1°49′34″S 66°35′56″W
- Country: Brazil
- Region: North
- State: Amazonas

Population (2020)
  - Total: 2,251
- Time zone: UTC−4 (BRT)
  - Summer (DST): UTC−4 (DST no longer used)

Japurá is a municipality located in the Brazilian state of Amazonas. Its population was 2,251 (2020) and its area is 55,791 km^{2} (21,541 sq mi). It forms the Japurá microregion together with the municipality Maraã (to the east of the Japurá municipality). The southern border of both the municipality and the microregion is the Japurá River.

It forms the Japurá microregion together with the municipality Maraã (to the east of the Japurá municipality).

The municipality contains the Juami-Japurá Ecological Station, which covers the entire Juami River basin. The municipality contains 55% of the 146,950-hectare (363,100-acre) Auatí-Paraná Extractive Reserve, created in 2001. It contains part of the 7,999,000-hectare (19,770,000-acre) Alto Rio Negro Indigenous Territory, created in 1998.

== In popular culture ==
- Japurá, rendered as "Jaburo," is the location of the main Earth Federation base in the Mobile Suit Gundam franchise.
