= Dede Camara =

Guinean swimmer

Personal information
- Born: July 22, 1991 (age 34) Fria, Guinea

Sport
- Sport: Swimming
- Strokes: Breaststroke

Dede Camara (born 22 July 1991) is a Guinean swimmer. She competed for Guinea at the 2012 Summer Olympics. Camara ranked 46th in the Women's 100m breaststroke event and did not advance to the semifinals.

== Disappearance ==
On 11 August 2012, one day before the Olympics closing ceremony, Dede Camara went missing from the Guinean team headquarters in London. Some days later, it was revealed that she was among a group of African athletes who had gone missing, and were thought to be either hiding or seeking asylum in the United Kingdom. It is unknown whether Camara remained in Britain after the expiry of her visa, or returned home, but the British government revealed in 2015 that 132 athletes and coaches from London 2012 had failed to return home and were still in Britain at that time.
