= Fria Airport =

Airport in Boke, Guinea

Fria Airport Aéroport de Fria (French)
- IATA: FIG; ICAO: GUFA

Summary
- Airport type: Public
- Serves: Fria, Guinea
- Elevation AMSL: 499 ft (152 m)
- Coordinates: 10°21′02″N 13°34′09″W

Map
- Location of airport in Guinea

Runways
Direction	Length		Surface
Direction	m	ft	Surface
06/24	1,600	5,249	Asphalt
- Sources: WAD GCM Google Maps

Fria Airport (IATA: FIG, ICAO: GUFA) is an airport serving Fria, a town and prefecture in the Boke Region of the Republic of Guinea. The airport is on the southeast side of Fria.

An overrun to the southwest will drop into a 100-metre (330 ft) deep ravine.

== See also ==
- Transport in Guinea
- List of airports in Guinea
