= Kankan Airport =

Airport in Kankan, Guinea

Kankan Airport Kankan Diankana Airport
- IATA: KNN; ICAO: GUXD

Summary
- Airport type: Public
- Serves: Kankan
- Elevation AMSL: 1,234 ft / 376 m
- Coordinates: 10°26′55″N 9°13′30″W

Map
- Location of the airport in Guinea

Runways
Direction	Length		Surface
Direction	m	ft	Surface
10/28	3,000	9,843	Asphalt/gravel
- Source: Google Maps GCM

Kankan Airport (IATA: KNN, ICAO: GUXD) (or Kankan Diankana Airport) is an airport serving Kankan, capital of the Kankan Region in Guinea. It is 7 kilometres (4.3 mi) northeast of the city, 2 kilometres (1.2 mi) south of the village of Diankana.

The airport was formerly within Kankan, with the ICAO code of GUXN. The old runway is now a street in the city.

The Kankan non-directional beacon (Ident: KN) is located in the city, 5.4 nautical miles (10.0 km) southwest of the airport.

== See also ==
- Transport in Guinea
- List of airports in Guinea
