= Siguiri =

Siguiri ߛߌ߯ߙߌ߲߫ Siri
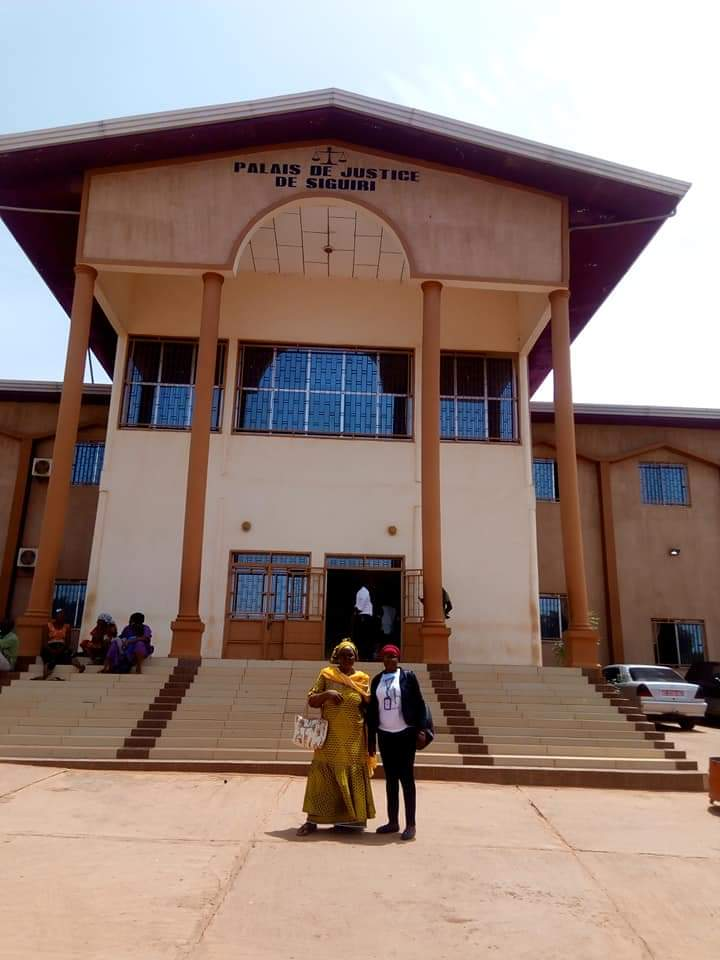
- The courthouse of Siguiri

- Location in Guinea
- Coordinates: 11°25′N 9°10′W
- Country: Guinea
- Region: Kankan Region
- Creation of the Cercle of Siguiri: 1890

Government
  - Mayor: Elhadj Koumba Sékou Magassouba

Population (2016)
  - Total: 196 308.

Siguiri (N’ko: ߛߌ߯ߙߌ߲߫; Arabic: سِجِرِ ِ) is a city in northeastern Guinea on the River Niger. It is a sub-prefecture and capital of Siguiri Prefecture in the Kankan Region.

It is known for its goldsmiths and as the birthplace of Sekouba Bambino Diabaté. Siguiri is the site of a former French fort built in 1888, and the Siguiri Airport.

== Etymology ==
'Sigui' means 'buffalo' and 'ri' means place, a name given to the area due to its dense brush and abundant population of wild animals.

== History ==
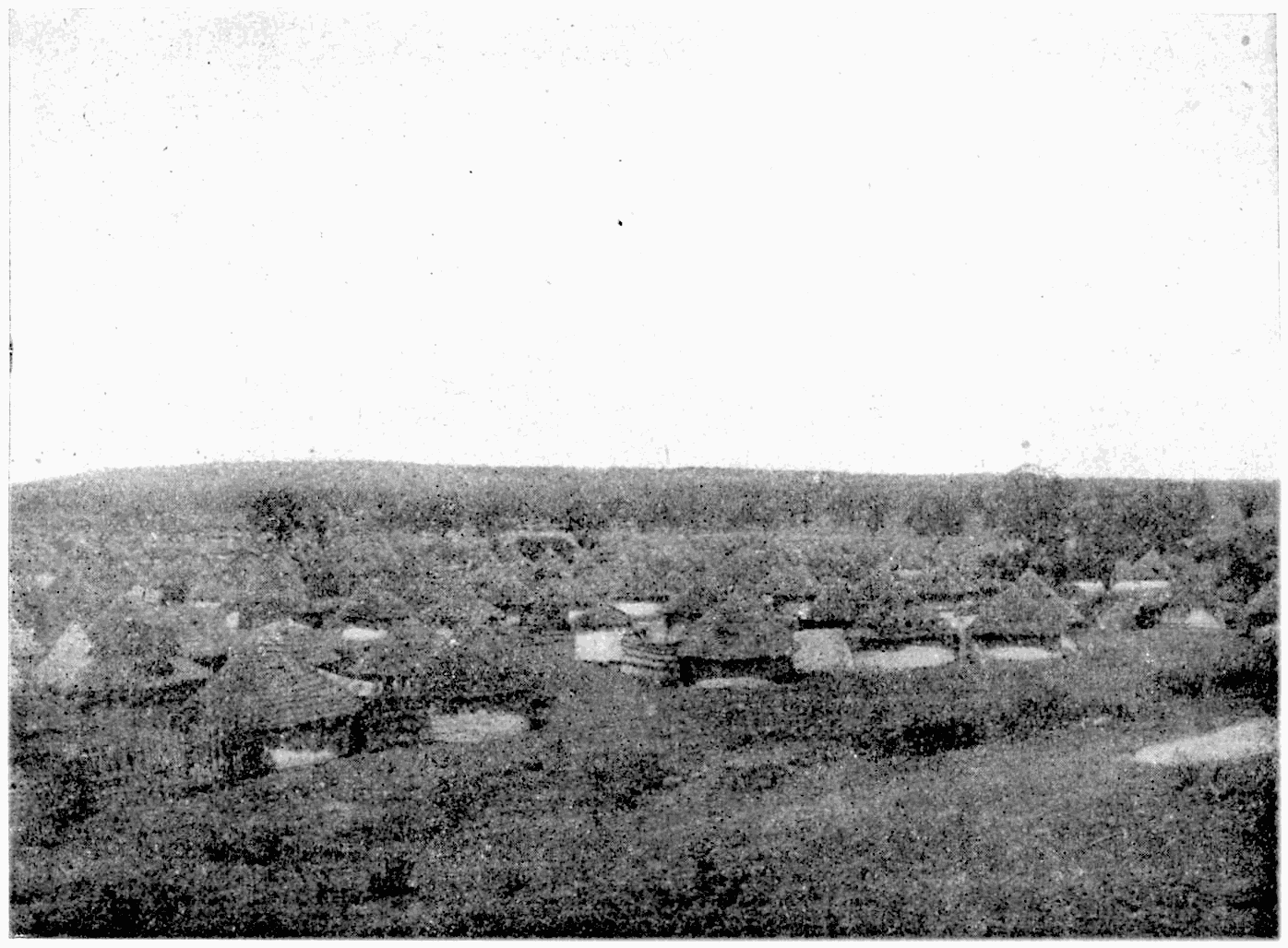
Siguiri in the early 20th century

Siguiri has been an important center since the time of Sundiata Keita. Some oral traditions have Sundiata's oldest son, Nyamagan, settling and ruling there. The town moved several times, on both sides of the river, due to flooding and the search for richer agricultural land on the banks of the Niger.

== Mining ==
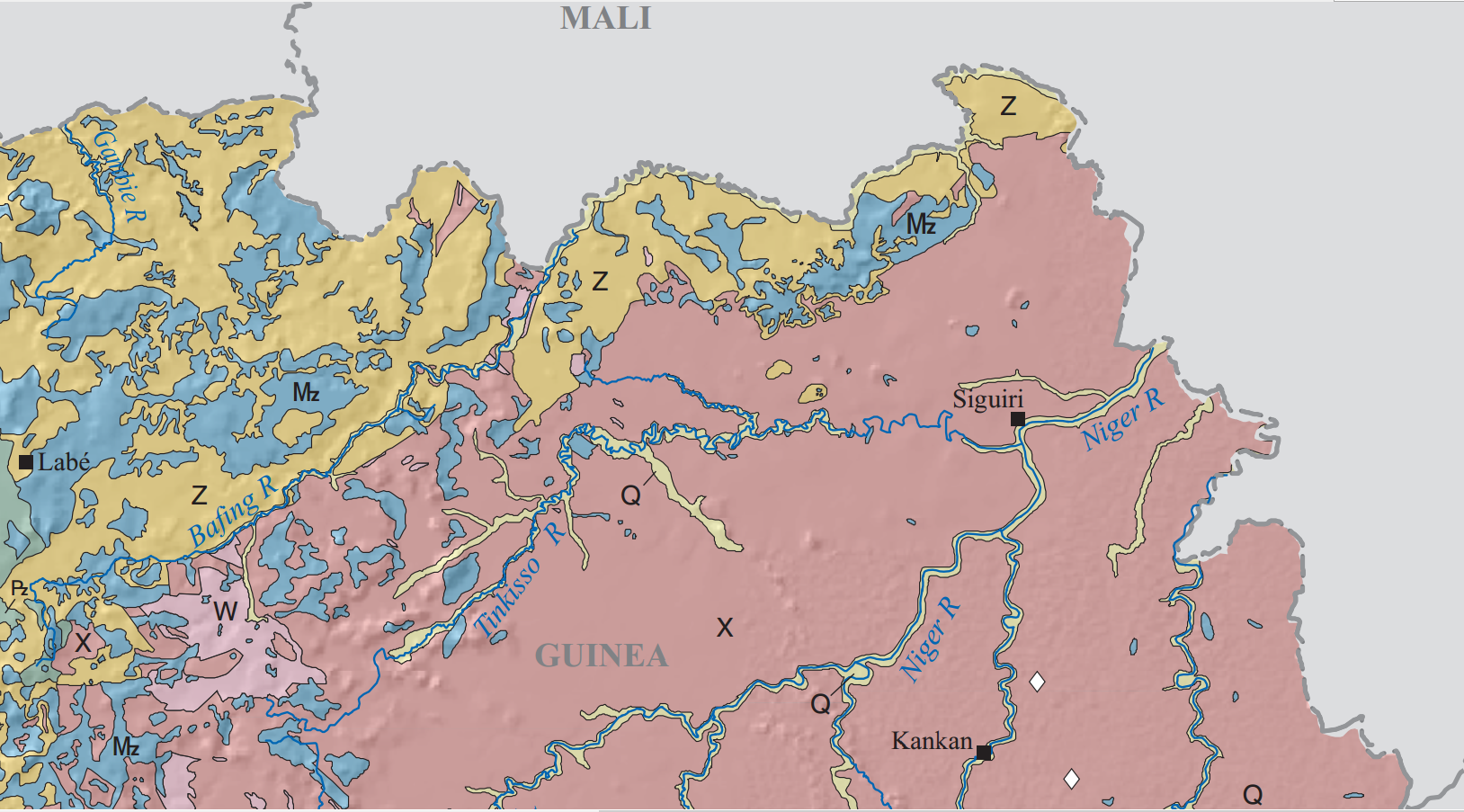
Geological map of the Siguiri area, where X is Paleoproterozoic and Z is Neoproterozoic.

Placer gold is mined here. North and northwest of Siguiri, and along the Tinkisso River, is the Bouré region. This region replaced Bambouk as a major gold producer in the 11th-12th centuries.

== Climate ==
Siguiri has a tropical savanna climate (Köppen climate classification Aw).

Climate data for Siguiri
Month	Jan	Feb	Mar	Apr	May	Jun	Jul	Aug	Sep	Oct	Nov	Dec	Year
Mean daily maximum °C (°F)	36.4 (97.5)	38.4 (101.1)	39.4 (102.9)	40.0 (104.0)	38.5 (101.3)	35.7 (96.3)	32.5 (90.5)	31.8 (89.2)	33.1 (91.6)	34.7 (94.5)	34.2 (93.6)	35.6 (96.1)	35.9 (96.6)
Daily mean °C (°F)	24.9 (76.8)	27.7 (81.9)	29.9 (85.8)	30.9 (87.6)	29.5 (85.1)	26.9 (80.4)	25.4 (77.7)	25.2 (77.4)	25.4 (77.7)	26.7 (80.1)	26.3 (79.3)	24.8 (76.6)	27.0 (80.6)
Mean daily minimum °C (°F)	12.8 (55.0)	15.2 (59.4)	17.7 (63.9)	20.0 (68.0)	19.2 (66.6)	18.5 (65.3)	18.7 (65.7)	18.9 (66.0)	18.8 (65.8)	18.7 (65.7)	14.7 (58.5)	13.0 (55.4)	17.2 (63.0)
Average precipitation mm (inches)	0 (0)	2 (0.1)	4 (0.2)	32 (1.3)	85 (3.3)	160 (6.3)	248 (9.8)	287 (11.3)	234 (9.2)	95 (3.7)	12 (0.5)	1 (0.0)	1,160 (45.7)
Average precipitation days (≥ 1.0 mm)	0	0	1	3	8	12	16	18	16	8	0	0	82
Average relative humidity (%)	31	28	33	41	54	71	79	80	78	70	49	35	54
Mean monthly sunshine hours	268	244	206	237	236	227	198	174	204	240	261	258	2,753
Source: NOAA

== See also ==
- Birimian
