= Fonte Boa Airport =

Fonte Boa Airport Aeroporto de Fonte Boa
- IATA: FBA; ICAO: SWOB; LID: AM0014

Summary
- Airport type: Public
- Serves: Fonte Boa
- Time zone: BRT−1 (UTC−04:00)
- Elevation AMSL: 63 m (207 ft)
- Coordinates: 02°32′57″S 066°04′59″W

Map
- Location in Brazil

Runways
Direction	Length		Surface
Direction	m	ft	Surface
18/36	1,300	4,265	Asphalt
- Sources: ANAC, DECEA

Fonte Boa Airport (IATA: FBA, ICAO: SWOB) is the airport serving Fonte Boa, Brazil.

== Access ==
The airport is located 4 km (2 mi) from downtown Fonte Boa.

== See also ==
- List of airports in Brazil
