= Wilgrove Air Park =

Airport in North Carolina, United States of America

- IATA: None; ICAO: None; FAA LID: None

Summary
- Airport type: Public
- Owner: Wilgrove Investments, LLC
- Serves: Charlotte, North Carolina
- Elevation AMSL: 799 ft / 244 m
- Coordinates: 35°12′50″N 080°40′12″W
- Website: www.wilgroveairport.net
- Interactive map of Wilgrove Air Park

Runways
Direction	Length		Surface
Direction	ft	m	Surface
17/35	2,835	864	Asphalt

Statistics (2007)
- Aircraft operations: 16,100
- Based aircraft: 50
- Source: Federal Aviation Administration

Wilgrove Air Park was a public use airport located nine nautical miles (17 km) east of the central business district of Charlotte, in Mecklenburg County, North Carolina, United States. Wilgrove Air Park closed permanently in 2020.

== Facilities and aircraft ==
Wilgrove Air Park covered an area of 55 acres (22 ha) at an elevation of 799 feet (244 m) above mean sea level. It had one runway designated 17/35 with an asphalt surface measuring 2,835 by 40 feet (864 x 12 m). Its IATA code was QWG and its FAA LID was 8A6.

For the 12-month period ending September 20, 2007, the airport had 16,100 aircraft operations, an average of 44 per day: 99% general aviation and 1% military. At that time there were 50 aircraft based at this airport: 94% single-engine and 6% multi-engine.
