= Faranah Airport =

Airport in Faranah, Guinea

Faranah Airport Badala
- IATA: FAA; ICAO: GUFH

Summary
- Airport type: Public
- Serves: Faranah
- Elevation AMSL: 1,476 ft / 450 m
- Coordinates: 10°02′10″N 10°46′15″W

Map
- Location of the airport in Guinea

Runways
Direction	Length		Surface
Direction	m	ft	Surface
09/27	2,350	7,710	Asphalt
- Source: Google Maps GCM

Faranah Airport (IATA: FAA, ICAO: GUFH) is an airport serving the city of Faranah in Guinea. The airport is 2 kilometres (1.2 mi) west of the city, across the Niger River.

The Faranah VOR/DME (Ident: FRH) and Faranah non-directional beacon (Ident: FH) are located 1.1 nautical miles (2.0 km) north-northeast of the airport.

== See also ==
- Transport in Guinea
- List of airports in Guinea
