= Fort Bridger Airport =

- IATA: FBR; ICAO: KFBR; FAA LID: FBR

Summary
- Airport type: Public
- Owner: Uinta County
- Serves: Fort Bridger, Wyoming
- Elevation AMSL: 7,038 ft (2,145 m)
- Coordinates: 41°23′36″N 110°24′21.5″W
- Website: https://elkinsairport.com
- Interactive map of Fort Bridger Airport

Runways
Direction	Length		Surface
Direction	ft	m	Surface
4/22	6,504	1,952	Asphalt
7/25	3,520	1,073	Dirt
- Source: Federal Aviation Administration

Fort Bridger Airport (IATA: FBR, ICAO: KFBR, FAA LID: FBR) is a public-use airport located 4 mi (6.4 km) from the town of Fort Bridger, Wyoming. The airport is owned by Uinta County. The National Plan of Integrated Airport Systems for 2011–2015 categorized it as a general aviation facility.

== Facilities ==
The airport is located at an elevation of 7,038 ft (2,145 m). It has two runways: 4/22, which is 6404 x 75 ft. (1952 x 23 m), and 7/25, which is 3520 x 50 ft. (1073 x 15 m). The airport has no control tower.

Around 2001, the airspace around the airport was upgraded to Class E airspace, requiring increased amounts of separation while flying.
