= Fonte Boa, Amazonas =

Municipality of Amazonas, Brazil

Fonte Boa
- Municipality
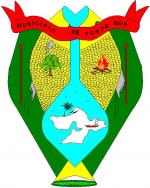
- Flag Coat of arms

- Location of the municipality inside Amazonas

- Location in Brazil
- Coordinates: 2°30′50″S 66°5′30″W
- Country: Brazil
- Region: North
- State: Amazonas

Population (2020)
  - Total: 17,005
- Time zone: UTC−4 (AMT)

Fonte Boa (literally, "good water spring") is a municipality located in the Brazilian state of Amazonas. Its population was 17,005 (2020) and its area is 12,111 km^{2}.

The city is served by Fonte Boa Airport.

One of the city's best-known attractions is the Pirarucu Festival, which celebrates the annual fishing of the fish.

== Geography ==
The municipality contains 45% of the 146,950 hectares (363,100 acres) Auatí-Paraná Extractive Reserve, created in 2001.

=== Climate ===
Climate data for Fonte Boa, Amazonas (1981–2010, extremes 1925–present)
Month	Jan	Feb	Mar	Apr	May	Jun	Jul	Aug	Sep	Oct	Nov	Dec	Year
Record high °C (°F)	37.0 (98.6)	36.5 (97.7)	37.5 (99.5)	36.0 (96.8)	35.7 (96.3)	34.7 (94.5)	36.3 (97.3)	37.3 (99.1)	37.0 (98.6)	38.0 (100.4)	37.6 (99.7)	36.5 (97.7)	38.0 (100.4)
Mean daily maximum °C (°F)	31.7 (89.1)	31.8 (89.2)	31.7 (89.1)	31.4 (88.5)	31.1 (88.0)	30.9 (87.6)	31.3 (88.3)	32.3 (90.1)	32.6 (90.7)	32.8 (91.0)	32.4 (90.3)	32.0 (89.6)	31.8 (89.2)
Daily mean °C (°F)	26.7 (80.1)	26.8 (80.2)	26.6 (79.9)	26.5 (79.7)	26.3 (79.3)	26.0 (78.8)	26.2 (79.2)	26.5 (79.7)	26.8 (80.2)	27.1 (80.8)	26.9 (80.4)	26.8 (80.2)	26.6 (79.9)
Mean daily minimum °C (°F)	22.8 (73.0)	23.3 (73.9)	22.8 (73.0)	22.8 (73.0)	22.6 (72.7)	22.3 (72.1)	22.1 (71.8)	22.4 (72.3)	22.5 (72.5)	22.9 (73.2)	22.9 (73.2)	22.9 (73.2)	22.7 (72.9)
Record low °C (°F)	19.0 (66.2)	18.0 (64.4)	19.0 (66.2)	13.0 (55.4)	18.4 (65.1)	16.2 (61.2)	14.5 (58.1)	15.0 (59.0)	12.0 (53.6)	19.4 (66.9)	17.9 (64.2)	14.4 (57.9)	12.0 (53.6)
Average precipitation mm (inches)	237.9 (9.37)	207.9 (8.19)	257.3 (10.13)	278.0 (10.94)	271.2 (10.68)	215.4 (8.48)	179.4 (7.06)	134.7 (5.30)	146.1 (5.75)	188.0 (7.40)	176.6 (6.95)	216.6 (8.53)	2,509.1 (98.78)
Average precipitation days (≥ 1.0 mm)	17	15	17	18	19	17	14	12	12	13	13	16	183
Average relative humidity (%)	89.1	89.3	90.3	90.2	90.1	90.2	89.0	88.5	87.6	87.4	88.0	88.3	89.0
Mean monthly sunshine hours	129.0	116.5	114.0	107.1	118.6	125.0	149.0	170.8	165.4	159.9	143.1	125.3	1,623.7
Source 1: Instituto Nacional de Meteorologia
Source 2: Meteo Climat (record highs and lows)
