= List of the busiest airports in South America =

This is a list of the busiest airports in South America.

== 2022 South America busiest airports by passenger traffic ==
Rank	Country	Airport	City	Passengers	Change 22-21
1	Colombia	El Dorado International Airport	Bogotá	36,478,591	▲65.13%
2	Brazil	São Paulo–Guarulhos International Airport	São Paulo	34,480,706	▲42.67%
3	Peru	Jorge Chávez International Airport	Lima	19,579,837	▲74.57%
4	Chile	Arturo Merino Benítez International Airport	Santiago	18,519,667	▲86.76%
5	Brazil	São Paulo–Congonhas Airport	São Paulo	18,073,610	▲86.76%
6	Brazil	Brasília International Airport	Brasília	13,471,797	▲28.31%
7	Colombia	José María Córdova International Airport	Medellín	13,214,155	▲66.92%
8	Argentina	Aeroparque Jorge Newbery	Buenos Aires	12,833,254	▲183.94%
9	Brazil	Viracopos International Airport	Campinas	11,845,500	▲17.92%
10	Brazil	Santos Dumont Airport	Rio de Janeiro	10,167,951	▲49.54%
11	Brazil	Belo Horizonte International Airport	Belo Horizonte	9,537,289	▲38.22%
12	Brazil	Recife/Guararapes–Gilberto Freyre International Airport	Recife	8,725,495	▲15.98%
13	Venezuela	Simon Bolivar International Airport	Caracas	8,244,064	▲NEW
14	Colombia	Alfonso Bonilla Aragón International Airport	Cali	7,217,373	▲38.48%
15	Colombia	Rafael Núñez International Airport	Cartagena	7,087,788	▲59.07%
16	Brazil	Salgado Filho Porto Alegre International Airport	Porto Alegre	6,654,062	▲37.49%
17	Argentina	Ministro Pistarini International Airport	Buenos Aires	6,628,352	▲113.75%
18	Brazil	Salvador International Airport	Salvador	6,552,356	▲19.44%
19	Brazil	Rio de Janeiro/Galeão International Airport	Rio de Janeiro	5,895,257	▲50.19%
20	Brazil	Fortaleza Airport	Fortaleza	5,709,106	▲46.53%
21	Brazil	Afonso Pena International Airport	Curitiba	4,888,813	▲57.10%
22	Ecuador	Mariscal Sucre International Airport	Quito	4,300,000	▲NEW
23	Brazil	Hercílio Luz International Airport	Florianópolis	3,403,571	▲44.29%
24	Brazil	Belém/Val-de-Cans International Airport	Belém	3,393,936	▲22.76%
25	Brazil	Goiânia International Airport	Goiânia	3,080,818	▲46.70%

== 2021 South America busiest airports by passenger traffic ==
Rank	Country	Airport	City	Passengers	Change 21-20
1	Brazil	São Paulo–Guarulhos International Airport	São Paulo	24,167,495	▲18.92%
2	Colombia	El Dorado International Airport	Bogotá	22,091,102	▲104.24%
3	Peru	Jorge Chávez International Airport	Lima	11,215,750	▲48.23%
4	Brazil	Brasília International Airport	Brasília	10,499,097	▲33.78%
5	Brazil	Viracopos International Airport	Campinas	10,045,361	▲49.73%
6	Chile	Arturo Merino Benítez International Airport	Santiago	9,916,293	▲16.28%
7	Brazil	São Paulo–Congonhas Airport	São Paulo	9,677,569	▲38.96%
8	Colombia	José María Córdova International Airport	Medellín	7,916,646	▲156.57%
9	Brazil	Recife/Guararapes–Gilberto Freyre International Airport	Recife	7,523,046	▲55.53%
10	Brazil	Belo Horizonte International Airport	Belo Horizonte	6,899,849	▲43.39%
11	Brazil	Santos Dumont Airport	Rio de Janeiro	6,799,614	▲37.15%
12	Brazil	Salvador International Airport	Salvador	5,486,014	▲42.83%
13	Colombia	Alfonso Bonilla Aragón International Airport	Cali	5,211,765	▲166.45%
14	Brazil	Salgado Filho Porto Alegre International Airport	Porto Alegre	4,839,594	▲35.88%
15	Argentina	Aeroparque Jorge Newbery	Buenos Aires	4,519,650	▲92.54%
16	Colombia	Rafael Núñez International Airport	Cartagena	4,455,787	▲137.06%
17	Brazil	Rio de Janeiro/Galeão International Airport	Rio de Janeiro	3,925,263	▼15.31%
18	Brazil	Fortaleza Airport	Fortaleza	3,896,165	▲23.44%
19	Brazil	Afonso Pena International Airport	Curitiba	3,111,942	▲24.06%
20	Argentina	Ministro Pistarini International Airport	Buenos Aires	3,101,000	▼6.18%
21	Brazil	Belém/Val-de-Cans International Airport	Belém	2,764,751	▲33.21%
22	Brazil	Hercílio Luz International Airport	Florianópolis	2,358,822	▲26.16%
23	Brazil	Eduardo Gomes International Airport	Manaus	2,258,789	▲30.93%
24	Brazil	Marechal Rondon International Airport	Cuiabá	2,139,211	▲NEW
25	Brazil	Goiânia International Airport	Goiânia	2,100,107	▲NEW

== 2020 South America busiest airports by passenger traffic ==
Rank	Country	Airport	City	Passengers	Change 20-19
1	Brazil	São Paulo–Guarulhos International Airport	São Paulo	20,322,520	▼52.74%
2	Colombia	El Dorado International Airport	Bogotá	10,816,372	▼69.09%
3	Chile	Arturo Merino Benítez International Airport	Santiago	8,527,737	▼65.38%
4	Brazil	Brasília International Airport	Brasília	7,848,297	▼53.08%
5	Peru	Jorge Chávez International Airport	Lima	7,566,704	▼70.21%
6	Brazil	São Paulo–Congonhas Airport	São Paulo	6,964,390	▼69.29%
7	Brazil	Viracopos International Airport	Campinas	6,709,061	▼36.62%
8	Brazil	Santos Dumont Airport	Rio de Janeiro	4,957,973	▼45.46%
9	Brazil	Recife/Guararapes–Gilberto Freyre International Airport	Recife	4,836,890	▼44.49%
10	Brazil	Belo Horizonte International Airport	Belo Horizonte	4,811,942	▼56.94%
11	Brazil	Rio de Janeiro/Galeão International Airport	Rio de Janeiro	4,635,123	▼65.69%
12	Brazil	Salvador International Airport	Salvador	3,840,940	▼50.67%
13	Brazil	Salgado Filho Porto Alegre International Airport	Porto Alegre	3,561,630	▼56.39%
14	Argentina	Ministro Pistarini International Airport	Buenos Aires	3,305,171	▼73.79%
15	Brazil	Fortaleza Airport	Fortaleza	3,156,418	▼55.14%
16	Colombia	José María Córdova International Airport	Medellín	3,085,601	▼66.48%
17	Brazil	Afonso Pena International Airport	Curitiba	2,508,359	▼61.43%
18	Argentina	Aeroparque Jorge Newbery	Buenos Aires	2,347,332	▼80.91%
19	Brazil	Belém/Val-de-Cans International Airport	Belém	2,075,540	▼42.80%
20	Colombia	Alfonso Bonilla Aragón International Airport	Cali	1,955,998	▼64.61%
21	Colombia	Rafael Núñez International Airport	Cartagena	1,879,635	▼66.81%
22	Brazil	Hercílio Luz International Airport	Florianópolis	1,869,671	▼52.33%
23	Brazil	Eduardo Gomes International Airport	Manaus	1,725,236	▼43.86%
24	Ecuador	Mariscal Sucre International Airport	Quito	1,521,680	▼69.79%
25	Brazil	Eurico de Aguiar Salles Airport	Vitória	1,502,639	▼55.00%

== 2019 South America busiest airports by passenger traffic ==
Rank	Country	Airport	City	Passengers	Change 19-18
1	Brazil	São Paulo–Guarulhos International Airport	São Paulo	43,002,119	▲1.83%
2	Colombia	El Dorado International Airport	Bogotá	34,989,785	▲6.95%
3	Peru	Jorge Chávez International Airport	Lima	25,402,742	▲6.82%
4	Chile	Arturo Merino Benítez International Airport	Santiago	24,630,742	▲5.60%
5	Brazil	Congonhas-São Paulo Airport	São Paulo	22,681,392	▲3.28%
6	Brazil	Brasília International Airport	Brasília	16,727,177	▼6.32%
7	Brazil	Rio de Janeiro–Galeão International Airport	Rio de Janeiro	13,508,309	▼9.98%
8	Argentina	Ministro Pistarini International Airport	Buenos Aires	12,609,270	▲12.57%
9	Argentina	Jorge Newbery Airport	Buenos Aires	12,298,969	▼7.98%
10	Brazil	Tancredo Neves International Airport	Belo Horizonte	11,173,878	▲5.50%
11	Brazil	Viracopos International Airport	Campinas	10,585,018	▲14.77%
12	Colombia	José María Córdova International Airport	Medellín	9,205,009	▲14.54%
13	Brazil	Santos Dumont Airport	Rio de Janeiro	9,091,258	▼0.81%
14	Brazil	Recife/Guararapes-Gilberto Freyre International Airport	Recife	8,714,119	▲3.74%
15	Brazil	Salgado Filho International Airport	Porto Alegre	8,298,205	▼0.04%
16	Brazil	Deputado Luís Eduardo Magalhães International Airport	Salvador	7,786,582	▼2.88%
17	Brazil	Pinto Martins International Airport	Fortaleza	7,218,697	▲9.14%
18	Brazil	Afonso Pena International Airport	Curitiba	6,502,746	▲3.78%
19	Colombia	Rafael Núñez International Airport	Cartagena	5,663,946	▲4.78%
20	Colombia	Alfonso Bonilla Aragón International Airport	Cali	5,527,532	▲13.49%
21	Ecuador	Mariscal Sucre International Airport	Quito	5,037,650	▼3.74%
22	Ecuador	José Joaquín de Olmedo International Airport	Guayaquil	3,970,573	▲3.07%
23	Brazil	Hercílio Luz International Airport	Florianópolis	3,922,032	▲2.15%
24	Peru	Alejandro Velasco Astete International Airport	Cusco	3,906,169	▲3.80%
25	Brazil	Belém/Val-de-Cans International Airport	Belém	3,628,807	▲3.36%

== 2018 South America busiest airports by passenger traffic ==
Rank	Country	Airport	City	Passengers	Change 18-17
1	Brazil	São Paulo–Guarulhos International Airport	São Paulo	42,230,432	▲11.82%
2	Colombia	El Dorado International Airport	Bogotá	32,716,468	▲5.57%
3	Peru	Jorge Chávez International Airport	Lima	23,779,937	▲7.86%
4	Chile	Arturo Merino Benítez International Airport	Santiago	23,324,306	▲8.86%
5	Brazil	Congonhas-São Paulo Airport	São Paulo	21,961,782	▲0.47%
6	Brazil	Brasília International Airport	Brasília	17,855,163	▲5.67%
7	Brazil	Rio de Janeiro–Galeão International Airport	Rio de Janeiro	15,005,304	▼7.62%
8	Argentina	Jorge Newbery Airport	Buenos Aires	13,365,290	▼2.94%
9	Argentina	Ministro Pistarini International Airport	Buenos Aires	11,201,350	▲8.65%
10	Brazil	Tancredo Neves International Airport	Belo Horizonte	10,591,138	▲4.20%
11	Brazil	Viracopos International Airport	Campinas	9,223,074	▼1.17%
12	Brazil	Santos Dumont Airport	Rio de Janeiro	9,165,905	▼0.88%
13	Brazil	Recife/Guararapes-Gilberto Freyre International Airport	Recife	8,399,935	▲8.01%
14	Brazil	Salgado Filho International Airport	Porto Alegre	8,301,172	▲3.61%
15	Colombia	José María Córdova International Airport	Medellín	8,036,411	▲5.47%
16	Brazil	Deputado Luís Eduardo Magalhães International Airport	Salvador	8,017,778	▲3.55%
17	Brazil	Pinto Martins International Airport	Fortaleza	6,614,227	▲11.44%
18	Brazil	Afonso Pena International Airport	Curitiba	6,284,073	▼6.72%
19	Colombia	Rafael Núñez International Airport	Cartagena	5,405,362	▲14.79%
20	Ecuador	Mariscal Sucre International Airport	Quito	5,228,072	▲6.91%
21	Colombia	Alfonso Bonilla Aragón International Airport	Cali	4,870,311	▼2.99%
22	Venezuela	Simón Bolívar International Airport	Caracas	3,883,572	▼13.35%
23	Ecuador	José Joaquín de Olmedo International Airport	Guayaquil	3,852,436	▲6.34%
24	Brazil	Hercílio Luz International Airport	Florianópolis	3,839,348	▼0.10%
25	Peru	Alejandro Velasco Astete International Airport	Cusco	3,763,300	▲11.35%

== 2013 South America busiest airports by passenger traffic ==
Rank	Country	Airport	IATA airport code	City	Passengers	Change (13/10)
1	Brazil	São Paulo–Guarulhos International Airport	GRU	São Paulo	35,962,000	▲33.9%
2	Colombia	El Dorado International Airport	BOG	Bogotá	25,009,483	▲32.1%
3	Brazil	Congonhas-São Paulo Airport	CGH	São Paulo	17,119,530	▲10.6%
4	Brazil	Rio de Janeiro–Galeão International Airport	GIG	Rio de Janeiro	17,115,369	▲40.0%
5	Brazil	Brasília International Airport	BSB	Brasília	16,489,996	▲14.8%
6	Chile	Arturo Merino Benítez International Airport	SCL	Santiago	15,295,246	▲38.2%
7	Peru	Jorge Chávez International Airport	LIM	Lima	15,271,842	▲48.6%
8	Venezuela	Simón Bolívar International Airport	CCS	Caracas	11,956,178	▲35.3%
9	Brazil	Tancredo Neves International Airport	CNF	Belo Horizonte	10,301,288	▲42.0%
10	Argentina	Jorge Newbery Airport	AEP	Buenos Aires	9,552,504	▲26.4%
11	Brazil	Viracopos International Airport	VCP	Campinas	9,295,349	n/a
12	Brazil	Santos Dumont Airport	SDU	Rio de Janeiro	9,204,603	▲17.9%
13	Brazil	Deputado Luís Eduardo Magalhães International Airport	SSA	Salvador	8,589,663	▲13.9%
14	Argentina	Ministro Pistarini International Airport	EZE	Buenos Aires	8,533,372	▼2.9%
15	Brazil	Salgado Filho International Airport	POA	Porto Alegre	7,993,164	▲19.7%
16	Brazil	Recife/Guararapes-Gilberto Freyre International Airport	REC	Recife	6,840,276	n/a
17	Brazil	Afonso Pena International Airport	CWB	Curitiba	6,742,133	n/a
18	Brazil	Pinto Martins International Airport	FOR	Fortaleza	5,952,629	n/a
19	Ecuador	Mariscal Sucre International Airport	UIO	Quito	5,800,000	n/a
20	Colombia	José María Córdova International Airport	MDE	Medellín	5,077,540	n/a

== 2011 South America busiest airports by passenger traffic ==
Rank	Airport	Location	Country	Code (IATA)	Total passengers	Rank Change	% Change from 2010
1.	(Brazil) São Paulo–Guarulhos International Airport	Guarulhos, São Paulo	Brazil	GRU	30,003,428	Steady	▲11.7%
2.	(Colombia) El Dorado International Airport	Bogotá, Colombia	Colombia	BOG	20,427,603	Steady	▲7.8%
3.	(Brazil) Congonhas-São Paulo Airport	São Paulo, São Paulo	Brazil	CGH	16,756,452	Steady	▲8.1%
4.	(Brazil) Brasília International Airport	Lago Sul, Brasília	Brazil	BSB	15,398,737	Steady	▲7.3%
5.	(Brazil) Rio de Janeiro–Galeão International Airport	Rio de Janeiro, Rio de Janeiro	Brazil	GIG	14,952,830	Steady	▲21.2%
6.	(Peru) Jorge Chávez International Airport	Callao, Lima	Peru	LIM	11,904,553	▲1	▲7.6%
7.	(Chile) Arturo Merino Benítez International Airport	Santiago, Santiago	Chile	SCL	11,064,487	▼1	▲7.6%
8.	(Venezuela) Simón Bolívar International Airport	Maiquetía, Caracas	Venezuela	CCS	9,911,843	Steady	▲12.2%
9.	(Brazil) Tancredo Neves International Airport	Confins, Minas Gerais	Brazil	CNF	9,534,987	▲4	▲31,3%
10.	(Brazil) Santos Dumont Airport	Rio de Janeiro, RJ	Brazil	SDU	9,534,987	Steady	▲8,8%
11.	(Brazil) Deputado Luís Eduardo Magalhães International Airport	Salvador, Bahia	Brazil	SSA	8,394,900	Steady	▲9%
12.	(Argentina) Ministro Pistarini International Airport	Ezeiza, Buenos Aires	Argentina	EZE	8,278,159	▼3	▲9,5%
13.	(Argentina) Jorge Newbery Airport	Palermo, Buenos Aires	Argentina	AEP	8,250,971	▼1	▲13.3%
14.	(Brazil) Salgado Filho International Airport	Porto Alegre	Brazil	POA	7,834,312	Steady	▲17.3%
15.	(Brazil) Viracopos International Airport	Campinas	Brazil	VCP	7,568,384	▲2	▲39%
16.	(Brazil) Afonso Pena International Airport	Curitiba	Brazil	CWB	6,969,484	Steady	▲20%
17.	(Brazil) Recife/Guararapes-Gilberto Freyre International Airport	Recife	Brazil	REC	6,383,369	▼2	▲7%
18.	(Brazil) Pinto Martins International Airport	Fortaleza, Ceará	Brazil	FOR	5,647,104	Steady	▲11%
19.	(Ecuador) Mariscal Sucre International Airport	Quito, Pichincha	Ecuador	UIO	5,120,000	Steady	▲2.3%

== 2010 South America busiest airports by passenger traffic ==
Rank	Country	Airport	City	Passengers
1	Brazil	São Paulo–Guarulhos International Airport	São Paulo	26,849.185
2	Colombia	El Dorado International Airport	Bogotá	18,934.203
3	Brazil	Congonhas-São Paulo Airport	São Paulo	15,499.462
4	Brazil	Brasília International Airport	Brasília	14,347.061
5	Brazil	Rio de Janeiro–Galeão International Airport	Rio de Janeiro	12,337.944
6	Chile	Arturo Merino Benítez International Airport	Santiago	11,064.487
7	Peru	Jorge Chávez International Airport	Lima	10,278.493
8	Venezuela	Simón Bolívar International Airport	Maiquetía	8,830.688
9	Argentina	Ministro Pistarini International Airport	Buenos Aires	7,868.071
10	Brazil	Santos Dumont Airport	Rio de Janeiro	7,822.848
11	Brazil	Deputado Luís Eduardo Magalhães International Airport	Salvador	7,696.307
12	Argentina	Jorge Newbery Airport	Buenos Aires	7,558.149
13	Brazil	Tancredo Neves International Airport	Belo Horizonte	7,261.041
14	Brazil	Salgado Filho International Airport	Porto Alegre	6,676.216
15	Brazil	Recife/Guararapes–Gilberto Freyre International Airport	Recife	5,958.982
16	Brazil	Afonso Pena International Airport	Curitiba	5,774.615
17	Brazil	Viracopos International Airport	Campinas	5,430.066
18	Brazil	Pinto Martins International Airport	Fortaleza	5,072.721
19	Ecuador	Mariscal Sucre International Airport	Quito	5,000.500

== 2009 South America busiest airports by passenger traffic ==
Rank	Country	Airport	City	Passengers
1	Brazil	São Paulo-Guarulhos International Airport	São Paulo	21,727,642
2	Colombia	El Dorado International Airport	Bogotá	14,899,199
3	Brazil	Congonhas-São Paulo Airport	São Paulo	13,699,657
4	Brazil	Brasília International Airport	Brasília	12,213,825
5	Brazil	Rio de Janeiro–Galeão International Airport	Rio de Janeiro	11,828,656
6	Chile	Arturo Merino Benítez International Airport	Santiago	9,024,611
7	Peru	Jorge Chávez International Airport	Lima	8,786,973
8	Venezuela	Simón Bolívar International Airport	Maiquetía	8,773,461
9	Argentina	Ministro Pistarini International Airport	Buenos Aires	7,924,759
10	Brazil	Deputado Luís Eduardo Magalhães International Airport	Salvador	7,052,720
11	Argentina	Jorge Newbery Airport	Buenos Aires	6,489,066
12	Brazil	Tancredo Neves International Airport	Belo Horizonte	5,617,171
13	Brazil	Salgado Filho International Airport	Porto Alegre	5,607,703
14	Brazil	Recife/Guararapes–Gilberto Freyre International Airport	Recife	5,250,565

== 2008 South America busiest airports by passenger traffic ==
Rank	Country	Airport	City	Passengers
1	Brazil	São Paulo-Guarulhos International Airport	São Paulo	19,678,222
2	Brazil	Congonhas-São Paulo Airport	São Paulo	13,672,301
3	Colombia	El Dorado International Airport	Bogotá	13,548,420
4	Brazil	Rio de Janeiro–Galeão International Airport	Rio de Janeiro	10,754,689
5	Brazil	Brasília International Airport	Brasília	10,443,393
6	Chile	Arturo Merino Benítez International Airport	Santiago	9,017,718
7	Venezuela	Simón Bolívar International Airport	Maiquetía	8,975,897
8	Peru	Jorge Chávez International Airport	Lima	8,285,688
9	Argentina	Ministro Pistarini International Airport	Buenos Aires	8,012,794
10	Ecuador	Mariscal Sucre International Airport	Quito	4,274,922

== See also ==
- Transport in South America
- List of the busiest airports in Latin America
- List of airports in the Caribbean
- List of airports in Central America
