= Banankoro, Kérouané =

Banankoro
- Sub-prefecture and town
- Location in Guinea
- Coordinates: 9°11′N 9°18′W
- Country: Guinea
- Region: Kankan Region
- Prefecture: Kérouané Prefecture

Population (2014)
  - Total: 65,315
- Time zone: UTC+0 (GMT)

Banankoro is a town and sub-prefecture in the Kérouané Prefecture in the Kankan Region of south-eastern Guinea. As of 2014 it had a population of 65,315 people.
