= Faranah =

- Sub-prefecture and town
- Nickname: Sankaran
- Location in Guinea
- Coordinates: 10°02′N 10°44′W
- Country: Guinea
- Region: Faranah Region
- Elevation: 456 m (1,496 ft)

Population (2014 census)
  - Total: 78,108

Faranah (N’ko: ߝߙߊߣߊ߫߫) is a town and sub-prefecture in central Guinea, lying by the River Niger. As of 2014 it had a population of 78,108 people. The town is mainly inhabited by the Malinke people.

== History ==
Sékou Touré was born in what was then a village, and after becoming president developed it with a mosque, palace and conference centre. It lies immediately south west of the Haut Niger National Park. The town is served by Faranah Airport.

== Climate ==
Faranah has a tropical savanna climate (Köppen climate classification Aw).

Climate data for Faranah (1991–2020)
| Month | Jan | Feb | Mar | Apr | May | Jun | Jul | Aug | Sep | Oct | Nov | Dec | Year |
|---|---|---|---|---|---|---|---|---|---|---|---|---|---|
| Mean daily maximum °C (°F) | 32.9 (91.2) | 35.9 (96.6) | 36.7 (98.1) | 36.3 (97.3) | 33.7 (92.7) | 30.8 (87.4) | 29.4 (84.9) | 29.2 (84.6) | 29.8 (85.6) | 31.0 (87.8) | 32.3 (90.1) | 32.3 (90.1) | 32.5 (90.5) |
| Mean daily minimum °C (°F) | 14.0 (57.2) | 17.4 (63.3) | 20.8 (69.4) | 21.5 (70.7) | 21.0 (69.8) | 20.0 (68.0) | 19.7 (67.5) | 19.8 (67.6) | 19.6 (67.3) | 19.7 (67.5) | 18.0 (64.4) | 13.8 (56.8) | 18.8 (65.8) |
| Average precipitation mm (inches) | 2.2 (0.09) | 4.4 (0.17) | 20.2 (0.80) | 52.6 (2.07) | 165.9 (6.53) | 206.0 (8.11) | 279.5 (11.00) | 318.6 (12.54) | 348.4 (13.72) | 189.6 (7.46) | 21.6 (0.85) | 3.1 (0.12) | 1,612.1 (63.47) |
| Average relative humidity (%) | 44 | 39 | 42 | 55 | 68 | 75 | 80 | 80 | 79 | 77 | 66 | 52 | 63 |
Source: NOAA (humidity 1961–1990)

== Mining ==
Faranah is near major iron ore deposits.

== Notable residents ==
- Sayon Camara (Dinguiraye) - Guinean singer
