= Fria =

- Sub-prefecture and town
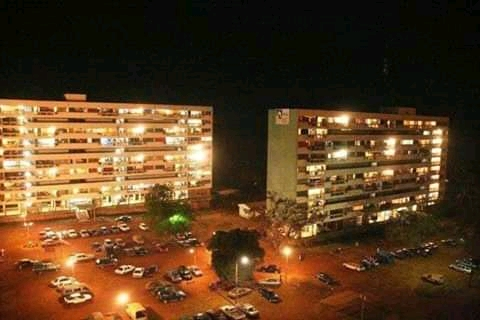

- Location in Guinea
- Coordinates: 10°27′N 13°32′W
- Country: Guinea
- Region: Boke Region
- Prefecture: Fria Prefecture

Population (2014 census)
  - Total: 61,691

Fria is a town and Sub-prefecture in Lower Guinea, lying north of Conakry near the Amaria Dam on the Konkouré River. As of 2014 it had a population of 61,691 people.

== Overview ==
There are some variations in the name of the town: Friguia, Kimbo or Kimbo-city. Fria is known for its local caves, the Grottes de Bogoro and the Grottes de Konkouré). The town's economy relies heavily upon bauxite mining and aluminum production. The town of Fria was built around a company called Kimbo-Fria, now ACG Fria (Aluminum Company of Guinea), Africa's first aluminum factory. ACG-Fria is the only operating alumina refinery in Guinea, producing 600,000 tonnes of alumina and 2.8 million tonnes of bauxite per year.

The president of Guinea, Lansana Conte, signed an agreement with RUSAL privatizing the bauxite and aluminum complex in Fria run by the Alumina Company of Guinea. This will allow for eventual doubling of the company's capacity.

== Transportation ==
Fria Airport serves the city.

=== Railway ===
The bauxite mine is connected by a 1000mm gauge railway to the port of Conakry.

== Notable Resident ==
- Dede Camara - Olympic swimmer

== See also ==
- Railway stations in Guinea
