= Société minière de Boké =

Mineral exploration company

- Founded: 2014
- Key people: Frédéric Bouzigues (General Manager)
- Products: Bauxite
- Number of employees: 9000
- Website: www.smb-guinee.com

Société minière de Boké or SMB is one of the main business enterprises in Guinea.

It deals mainly in Bauxite mining in the region of Boké, alongside CBG exporting from the ports of Dapilon and Katougouma on the Rio Nunez.

== Production ==
SMB produced more than 36 million tons of Bauxite in 2018, and production has since risen to 48 million tons in 2023. According to reports, SMB is Guinea's biggest bauxite producer, and together with the partially state-owned Compagnie des Bauxites de Guinée, the two companies are responsible for moving Guinea into a 22 percent share of the global bauxite market.

== SMB Winning Consortium ==
The company, partnered with other companies along the Aluminum-production value chain to construct industrial infrastructure in Guinea. The company joined with Winning Alliance Africa Port Ltd. (the local subsidiary of the Singaporean Winning International Group, the largest shipping company in Asia), United Mining Supply Group (a french-funded transport and logistics company), Shandong Weiqiao (A subsidiary of China Hongqiao Group, the second largest aluminum producer in China, and the Guinean state (A 10% shareholder in the company), to construct 135 kilometers of railway in a corridor stretching from Boffa Prefecture to Boké Prefecture to connect the new Houda and Santou II mines with the newly constructed Dapilon port on the Rio Nunez. They have also constructed a new alumina refinery in the Boké Special Economic Zone.

== Facilities ==
SMB operates mines at Dabiss, Santou, Kaboe and Malapouya.

== Controversy ==
The company has been cited for numerous human rights and environmental violations. Their operations are implicated in pollution of the air, water and land in areas surrounding its facilities. Water sources near their facilities have been polluted, resulting in numerous municipalities relying on SMB's tanker trucks for all their water. The company has also been criticized for impropriety when acquiring land.
