= Boké Museum =

History of the building and collection of Boké Prefectural Museum

Coordinates: 10°56′00″N 14°17′45″W

The Boké Prefectural Museum (French: Musée Préfectoral de Boké) is a regional museum located in Boké Prefecture, in the Boké Region of Guinea. Inaugurated in 1982, it is housed in a small fort constructed in 1878.

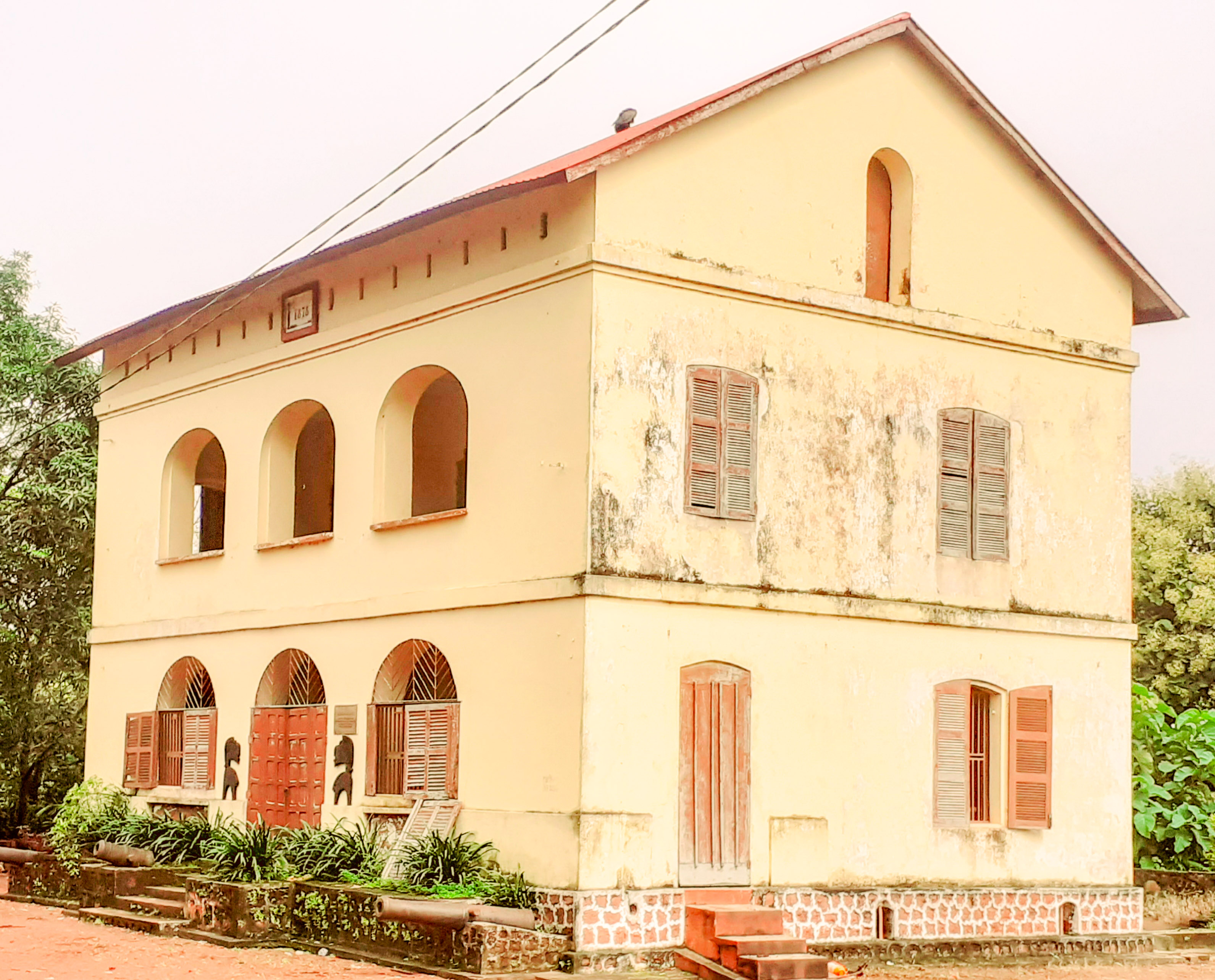
View of the Boké Museum

== History ==
Prior to being restored as a museum, the Boké Fort was the location of the incarceration of two kings: Alfa Yaya of Labé and Dinah Salifou, the last king of the Nalu people.

In 1971, the fort was transformed into a museum by Ahmed Sekou Touré, then restored in 1982 by the Friends of the Museum Association.

== Collections ==
The Boké museum has a collection of objects from the different cultures and ethnic groups of the region: Baga objects such as communication tom-toms, drums for the initiation of women, the baga serpent for the initiation of boys, guinzes “toma currency” and nimba masks, symbols of fertility. In the basement of the museum there are also some cells where prisoners were held.
