= Demographics of Guinea =

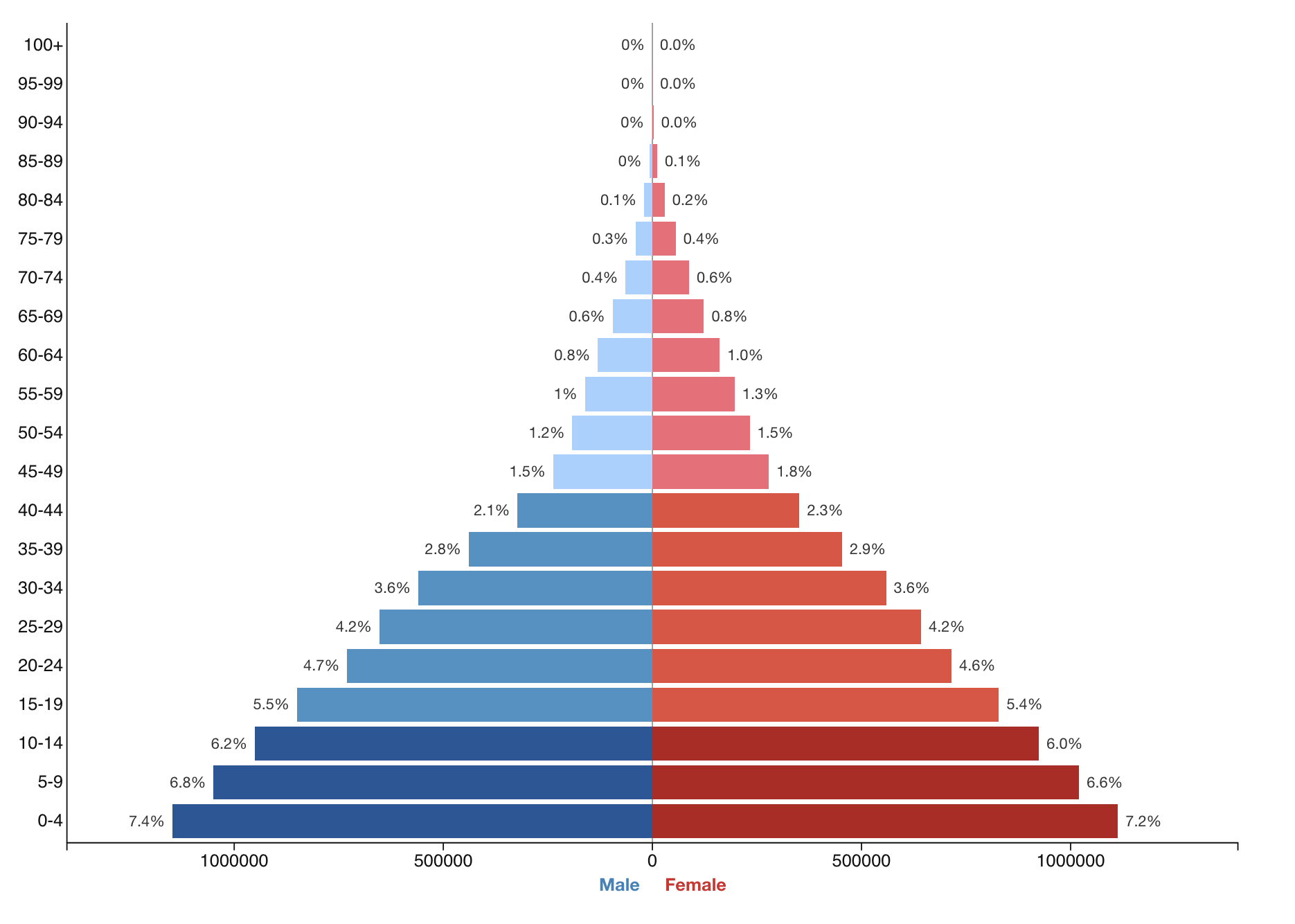
- Population pyramid of Guinea in 2026
- Population: ▲17,521,167 (2025)
- Growth rate: ▲4.74% (2025)
- Birth rate: 35.67 births/1,000 population (2022 est.)
- Death rate: 8.12 deaths/1,000 population (2022 est.)
- Life expectancy: 63.9 years
  - male: 62.04 years
  - female: 65.82 years
- Fertility rate: 4.85 children born/woman (2022 est.)
- Infant mortality: 49.63 deaths/1,000 live births
- Net migration rate: 0 migrant(s)/1,000 population (2022 est.)

Age structure
- 0–14 years: 41.2%
- 65 and over: 3.91%

Sex ratio
- Total: 1 male(s)/female (2022 est.)
- At birth: 1.03 male(s)/female
- Under 15: 1.02 male(s)/female
- 65 and over: 0.68 male(s)/female

Nationality
- Nationality: Guinean

Language
- Official: French

Demographics of Guinea describes the condition and overview of Guinea's peoples. Demographic topics include basic education, health, and population statistics as well as identified racial and religious affiliations.

== Population ==
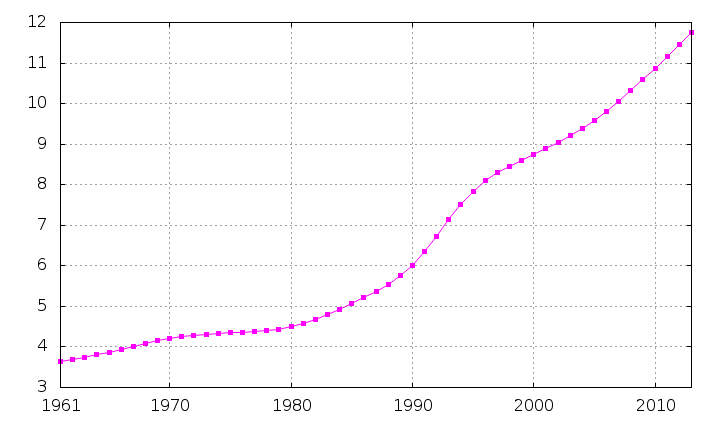
Guinea's total population, from 1961 to 2003. Guinea's population came close to tripling in forty years.

Population, fertility rate and net reproduction rate, United Nations estimates

Historical population
Year	Pop.	±% p.a.
1983	4,660,582	—
1996	7,156,406	+3.35%
2014	10,523,261	+2.17%
2025	17,521,167	+4.74%
Sources: Guinean censuses (1983–2025).

According to the 2022 revision of the World Population Prospects the total population was 13,531,906 in 2021, compared to only 3 094 000 in 1950. The proportion of children below the age of 15 in 2010 was 42.9%, 53.8% was between 15 and 65 years of age, while 3.3% was 65 years or older .

	Total population	Population aged 0–14 (%)	Population aged 15–64 (%)	Population aged 65+ (%)
1950	3 094 000	37.1	57.6	5.3
1955	3 300 000	38.6	57.0	4.4
1960	3 541 000	40.0	56.2	3.8
1965	3 823 000	41.8	54.9	3.4
1970	4 154 000	42.2	54.6	3.2
1975	4 287 000	42.6	54.3	3.1
1980	4 407 000	43.3	53.5	3.2
1985	4 924 000	43.9	52.8	3.3
1990	5 759 000	44.4	52.3	3.3
1995	7 565 000	44.6	52.1	3.3
2000	8 344 000	44.2	52.4	3.3
2005	9 041 000	43.6	53.0	3.3
2010	9 982 000	42.9	53.8	3.3

Population Estimates by Sex and Age Group (01.VII.2020) (Population in households only. Post-censal estimates.):

Age group	Male	Female	Total	%
Total	6 091 847	6 467 776	12 559 623	100
0–4	1 037 280	1 022 153	2 059 433	16.40
5–9	959 509	929 185	1 888 694	15.04
10–14	822 307	806 488	1 628 795	12.97
15–19	657 907	666 443	1 324 350	10.54
20–24	528 044	567 632	1 095 676	8.72
25–29	417 642	512 403	930 045	7.41
30–34	339 033	443 928	782 962	6.23
35–39	275 317	357 350	632 667	5.04
40–44	228 609	289 300	517 909	4.12
45–49	192 971	228 709	421 680	3.36
50–54	162 513	181 040	343 553	2.74
55–59	135 604	137 422	273 025	2.17
60–64	110 535	105 633	216 168	1.72
65–69	85 963	81 143	167 106	1.33
70–74	62 168	59 044	121 212	0.97
75–79	39 993	39 338	79 331	0.63
80+	36 453	40 565	77 018	0.61
Age group	Male	Female	Total	Percent
0–14	2 819 096	2 757 826	5 576 922	44.40
15–64	3 048 174	3 489 860	6 538 034	52.06
65+	224 577	220 090	444 667	3.54

== Vital statistics ==
Registration of vital events is in Guinea not complete. The website Our World in Data prepared the following estimates based on statistics from the Population Department of the United Nations.

	Mid-year population	Live births	Deaths	Natural change	Crude birth rate (per 1000)	Crude death rate (per 1000)	Natural change (per 1000)	Total fertility rate (TFR)	Infant mortality (per 1000 live births)	Life expectancy (in years)
1950	2,984,000	135,000	85,000	49,000	45.0	28.6	16.4	5.97	202.7	35.55
1951	3,032,000	137,000	88,000	49,000	45.1	29.1	16.1	5.98	202.7	35.55
1952	3,081,000	139,000	90,000	49,000	45.2	29.2	16.0	5.99	202.6	35.59
1953	3,131,000	142,000	92,000	50,000	45.3	29.3	16.0	6.01	202.3	35.67
1954	3,182,000	145,000	93,000	51,000	45.4	29.3	16.1	6.02	201.9	35.73
1955	3,234,000	147,000	94,000	53,000	45.5	29.1	16.3	6.04	201.5	35.90
1956	3,288,000	150,000	96,000	54,000	45.5	29.1	16.5	6.05	200.9	35.97
1957	3,342,000	152,000	97,000	56,000	45.6	29.0	16.6	6.07	200.2	36.06
1958	3,399,000	155,000	98,000	57,000	45.6	28.8	16.9	6.08	199.3	36.25
1959	3,457,000	158,000	99,000	59,000	45.6	28.6	17.0	6.10	198.3	36.36
1960	3,517,000	161,000	100,000	61,000	45.7	28.4	17.3	6.11	197.3	36.55
1961	3,579,000	164,000	101,000	63,000	45.7	28.1	17.5	6.13	196.1	36.75
1962	3,642,000	166,000	102,000	65,000	45.7	27.9	17.7	6.14	194.9	36.91
1963	3,708,000	169,000	102,000	67,000	45.6	27.6	18.0	6.15	193.7	37.16
1964	3,776,000	172,000	103,000	68,000	45.5	27.4	18.1	6.17	192.4	37.34
1965	3,845,000	175,000	104,000	71,000	45.5	27.1	18.4	6.18	191.1	37.60
1966	3,917,000	178,000	105,000	73,000	45.4	26.8	18.6	6.19	189.7	37.84
1967	3,991,000	181,000	106,000	75,000	45.3	26.5	18.8	6.20	188.2	38.12
1968	4,067,000	184,000	106,000	78,000	45.3	26.1	19.3	6.21	186.8	38.56
1969	4,145,000	188,000	107,000	81,000	45.3	25.9	19.4	6.23	185.3	38.72
1970	4,222,000	192,000	108,000	84,000	45.4	25.6	19.8	6.24	183.9	39.01
1971	4,298,000	195,000	109,000	86,000	45.4	25.3	20.1	6.26	182.3	39.31
1972	4,372,000	199,000	110,000	89,000	45.4	25.0	20.4	6.28	180.7	39.67
1973	4,445,000	202,000	111,000	92,000	45.4	24.9	20.6	6.31	179.0	39.89
1974	4,517,000	205,000	112,000	94,000	45.4	24.6	20.7	6.34	177.2	40.14
1975	4,588,000	209,000	112,000	97,000	45.3	24.3	21.1	6.37	175.3	40.59
1976	4,659,000	212,000	112,000	100,000	45.3	23.9	21.4	6.40	173.2	41.02
1977	4,730,000	216,000	112,000	104,000	45.4	23.6	21.8	6.43	170.9	41.41
1978	4,805,000	220,000	112,000	108,000	45.5	23.2	22.3	6.47	168.6	41.90
1979	4,885,000	225,000	112,000	113,000	45.9	22.9	23.0	6.54	166.2	42.39
1980	4,973,000	229,000	112,000	116,000	45.9	22.5	23.3	6.54	163.8	42.88
1981	5,067,000	233,000	113,000	120,000	45.9	22.2	23.7	6.56	161.4	43.32
1982	5,171,000	239,000	113,000	126,000	46.1	21.8	24.3	6.58	159.1	43.93
1983	5,282,000	244,000	114,000	131,000	46.1	21.5	24.7	6.59	156.8	44.38
1984	5,402,000	250,000	114,000	136,000	46.2	21.1	25.1	6.60	154.4	44.95
1985	5,532,000	256,000	114,000	142,000	46.3	20.7	25.6	6.61	152.0	45.52
1986	5,671,000	263,000	116,000	148,000	46.4	20.4	26.0	6.64	149.7	45.92
1987	5,821,000	271,000	117,000	154,000	46.6	20.0	26.5	6.67	147.4	46.42
1988	5,977,000	278,000	119,000	159,000	46.5	19.9	26.7	6.66	145.0	46.59
1989	6,136,000	285,000	121,000	164,000	46.5	19.7	26.8	6.66	142.4	46.85
1990	6,354,000	292,000	123,000	169,000	46.3	19.5	26.8	6.63	139.6	47.00
1991	6,616,000	305,000	126,000	180,000	46.4	19.1	27.3	6.59	136.6	47.55
1992	6,832,000	316,000	126,000	190,000	46.2	18.5	27.8	6.55	133.4	48.36
1993	7,046,000	322,000	126,000	196,000	45.9	18.0	27.9	6.49	129.9	48.96
1994	7,262,000	328,000	129,000	199,000	45.2	17.7	27.4	6.41	126.6	49.17
1995	7,468,000	331,000	128,000	204,000	44.4	17.1	27.3	6.34	123.0	49.87
1996	7,683,000	340,000	127,000	213,000	44.2	16.6	27.7	6.25	119.1	50.54
1997	7,843,000	345,000	126,000	219,000	43.7	15.9	27.8	6.16	115.5	51.36
1998	7,993,000	342,000	123,000	219,000	42.7	15.4	27.3	6.08	111.9	52.05
1999	8,175,000	346,000	123,000	223,000	42.2	15.0	27.2	6.01	108.1	52.36
2000	8,337,000	349,000	124,000	225,000	41.6	14.8	26.8	5.94	104.4	52.48
2001	8,446,000	349,000	124,000	226,000	41.0	14.5	26.5	5.85	100.8	52.66
2002	8,578,000	348,000	121,000	227,000	40.5	14.1	26.5	5.79	97.3	53.28
2003	8,772,000	353,000	121,000	232,000	40.1	13.7	26.4	5.74	94.0	53.68
2004	8,961,000	359,000	120,000	239,000	39.9	13.4	26.5	5.72	91.0	54.12
2005	9,140,000	366,000	120,000	247,000	39.9	13.0	26.9	5.70	88.4	54.63
2006	9,331,000	373,000	119,000	254,000	39.8	12.7	27.1	5.66	86.0	55.11
2007	9,547,000	381,000	119,000	262,000	39.8	12.4	27.4	5.62	84.0	55.55
2008	9,780,000	390,000	119,000	271,000	39.8	12.1	27.6	5.56	82.0	56.04
2009	10,021,000	399,000	120,000	279,000	39.7	11.9	27.8	5.51	80.4	56.35
2010	10,271,000	405,000	120,000	285,000	39.4	11.7	27.7	5.40	78.8	56.72
2011	10,528,000	410,000	121,000	289,000	38.9	11.5	27.5	5.30	77.4	57.02
2012	10,789,000	415,000	121,000	294,000	38.4	11.2	27.2	5.20	76.1	57.41
2013	11,055,000	422,000	121,000	301,000	38.1	10.9	27.2	5.12	74.8	57.79
2014	11,333,000	430,000	123,000	307,000	37.9	10.9	27.0	5.05	73.9	57.89
2015	11,626,000	441,000	125,000	316,000	37.9	10.7	27.2	5.02	72.7	58.13
2016	11,931,000	446,000	124,000	323,000	37.4	10.4	27.0	4.93	71.2	58.76
2017	12,241,000	449,000	124,000	325,000	36.6	10.1	26.5	4.79	70.1	59.11
2018	12,555,000	451,000	125,000	326,000	35.9	9.9	26.0	4.67	68.8	59.35
2019	12,878,000	456,000	125,000	331,000	35.4	9.7	25.7	4.58	67.4	59.72
2020	13,371,000	475,000	133,000	342,000	35.5	9.9	25.6	4.49	66.0	59.4
2021	13,711,000	480,000	135,000	345,000	35.0	9.8	25.2	4.40	69.7	59.4
2022	14,055,000	483,000	131,000	353,000	34.4	9.3	25.1	4.30	66.9	60.4
2023	14,405,000	488,000	131,000	356,000	33.8	9.1	24.7	4.22	65.4	60.7

View source data.
View source data.
View source data.
View source data.

=== Demographic and Health Surveys ===
Total Fertility Rate (TFR) (Wanted Fertility Rate) and Crude Birth Rate (CBR):

Year	CBR (Total)	TFR (Total)	CBR (Urban)	TFR (Urban)	CBR (Rural)	TFR (Rural)
1992	41	5.67 (5.1)	37	5.18 (4.5)	42	5.89 (5.3)
1999	36.9	5.5 (5.0)	32.9	4.4 (3.8)	38.4	6.1 (5.6)
2005	38.4	5.7 (5.1)	31.8	4.4 (3.9)	40.8	6.3 (5.7)
2012	34	5.1 (4.6)	29.4	3.8	36.1	5.8
2018	33.6	4.8 (4.3)	29.4	3.8 (3.4)	35.8	5.5 (4.9)
2024-2025	31.5	4.5 (4.1)	26.0	3.3 (3.1)	34.2	5.3 (4.8)

Fertility data as of 2012 and 2018 (DHS Program):

Administrative region	Total fertility rate (2012)	Total fertility rate (2018)	Percentage of women age 15-49 currently pregnant (2012)	Percentage of women age 15-49 currently pregnant (2018)	Mean number of children ever born to women age 40-49 (2012)	Mean number of children ever born to women age 40-49 (2018)
Boké	4.7	4.8	14.4	9.7	5.6	5.2
Conakry	3.6	3.2	6.2	5.8	4.8	4.1
Faranah	5.8	5.8	11.6	10.5	6.7	5.8
Kankan	6.9	6.5	14.4	13.6	6.9	6.9
Kindia	5.2	5.0	12.4	10.2	6.2	5.5
Labé	5.3	5.6	8.9	7.6	6.5	5.0
Mamou	5.4	4.1	8.4	7.9	6.1	4.8
N'Zérékoré	5.1	4.5	11.0	6.3	5.6	4.2

=== Life expectancy ===
Period	Life expectancy in Years
1950–1955	33.07
1955–1960	▲34.33
1960–1965	▲35.38
1965–1970	▲36.14
1970–1975	▲37.43
1975–1980	▲39.87
1980–1985	▲43.05
1985–1990	▲47.92
1990–1995	▲51.28
1995–2000	▲51.61
2000–2005	▼51.31
2005–2010	▲55.45
2010–2015	▲57.93

== Ethnic groups ==
- Fulɓe (singular Pullo). Called Peuhl or Peul in French, Fula or Fulani in English, who are chiefly found in the mountainous region of Fouta Djallon;
- Maninka. Malinké in French, Mandinka or Mandingo in English, mostly inhabiting the savanna of Upper Guinea and the Forest region;
- Susus or Soussous. Susu is not a lingua franca in Guinea. Although it is commonly spoken in the coastal areas, including the capital, Conakry, it is not largely understood in the interior of the country.
- Several small groups (Gerzé or Kpelle, Toma, Kissis, etc.) in the forest region and Bagas (including Landoumas), Koniaguis etc.), In the coastal area.

- Fulani (Peul) 33,4%
- Malinke 29,4%
- Soussou 21.2%
- Guerze 7.8%
- Kissi 6.2%
- Toma 1.6%
- Other/No Answer 4% (2018 est.)

== Languages ==
French (official), each ethnic group has its own language.

Other languages have established Latin orthographies that are used somewhat, notably for Susu and Maninka. The N'Ko script is increasingly used on a grassroots level for the Maninka language.

== Religion ==
Religion in Guinea (ARDA 2020 est.)
1. Sunni (85.3%)
2. Ethnic Religion (10.9%)
3. Catholic (2.51%)
4. Other Christian (1.03%)
5. None (0.17%)
6. Other (0.11%)

Muslim 86.8%, Christian 3.52%, Indigenous beliefs 9.42%, Buddhist 0.5%, no religious beliefs 0.1% (2020).
