= Nalu language =

Atlantic language of Guinea and Guinea-Bissau

Nalu
- Native to: Guinea, Guinea-Bissau
- Ethnicity: Nalu
- Native speakers: 23,000 (2017–2018)
- Language family: Niger–Congo?: Atlantic–Congo; ? Atlantic; (unclassified); Nalu

Language codes
- ISO 639-3: naj
- Glottolog: nalu1240
- ELP: Nalu

Nalu (nalɛ, nul; also spelled Nalou) is an Atlantic language of Guinea and Guinea-Bissau, spoken by the Nalu people, a West African people who settled the region before the arrival of the Mandinka in the 14th or 15th centuries. It is spoken predominantly by adults. It is estimated to be spoken by a range of 10,000 to 25,000 people, whereas Wilson (2007) reports that there are around 12,000 speakers. It is considered an endangered language due to its dwindling population of speakers.

== Classification ==
Contrary to prior classifications, Güldemann (2018) classifies Nalu as unclassified within Niger-Congo. It also does not form a subgroup with the Rio Nunez languages.

Nalu is traditionally classified as Niger-Congo, Atlantic-Congo, Mbulugish-Nalu.

== History ==
The Nalu people who speak Nalu have been described as settling in West Africa before the Mandinka people. This would place them as existing in West Africa between the 14th and 15th centuries. Wilson (2007) reports that the Nalu people had originally come from Guinea-Bissau.

Today, the Nalu speakers are shifting toward the Susu language which is gaining more popularity in Guinea. It has a predominantly adult-speaking population. The next generation is being passed on the language, however, in a few remote villages around Katoufoura.

== Geographic distribution ==
Nalu is spoken predominantly on the littorals, or shore regions, of Guinea and Guinea-Bissau. Most Nalu speakers in Guinea live north of the Nuñez River on the Tristão islands, in the sub-prefecture of Kanfarandé which is the prefecture of Boké. In Guinea-Bissau, most speakers of Nalu live in the Cacine estuary in the Tombali region.

== Phonology ==
Consonants
	Labial	Alveolar	Palatal	Velar	Labiovelar
Plosive	p b	t d	c	g	gb
Fricative	f	θ, s			h
Nasal	m	n		ŋ	
Approximant	w	r, l	j		

Vowels
	Front	Central	Back
High	i iː		u uː
Mid-high	e eː		o oː
Mid-low	ɛ ɛː		ɔ ɔː
Low		a aː	

- It is unclear whether vowel length is phonemic.

== Vocabulary ==
Nalu underwent a sound change in its language. Sound change generally occurs due to what sounds require less effort for the speaker. These sound changes are usually limited to each dialect in a language and examples of the Nalu language sound changes are in the section below. Nalu has six dialects. Three are spoken in Guinea-Conakry and three are spoken in Guinée-Bissau. However, the relationship between the dialects is unknown.

=== Examples ===
Nouns

English	Nalu
man	be-cel
dirty/black	m-balax
cold	m-hon
arrow	n-kiam
axe	n-wōfañ
blood	a-nyak
bow	m-firl
brother	n-wōke
chief/king	m-fem/be-fem
devil/evil spirit	m-banjon
medicine man (doctor)	mi-let
fire	met
god	gu-dana
moon	m-bilañ
night	fot
slave	m-bōl
snake	mi-sis

Verbs

English	Nalu
to come	m-ba
to kill	rama
to die	n-ref

Sound Changes Over Time

English	Pre-Sound Change Nalu	Post-Sound Change Nalu
bone	nhol	a-hol
mouth	n-sol	a-sol
to kill	m-rama	rama
man	nlam-cel	be-cel
eye	n-cet	a-cet
