= Mamadou Bobo Diallo =

Guinean politician

Deputy in the National Assembly (Guinea)
- President: Alpha Conde
- Preceded by: Kadiatou N’Diaye
- Constituency: Boke

Personal details
- Party: Rally of the Guinean People

Mamadou Bobo Diallo is a Guinean politician who represents the constituency of Boke, in the National Assembly (Guinea). He is a member of the Majority Rally of the Guinean People Party of former president Alpha Conde.
