= Sanguéya =

- Location in Guinea
- Coordinates: 10°42′N 14°22′W
- Country: Guinea
- Region: Boke Region
- Prefecture: Boke Prefecture

Population (2008)
  - Total: 8,015

Sanguéya is a town in western Guinea. It is located in Boke Prefecture in the Boke Region. The population is 8,217 (2008 est).
