= Dinah Salifou =

Last king of the Nalu people of Guinea

Mohammad Dinah Salifou
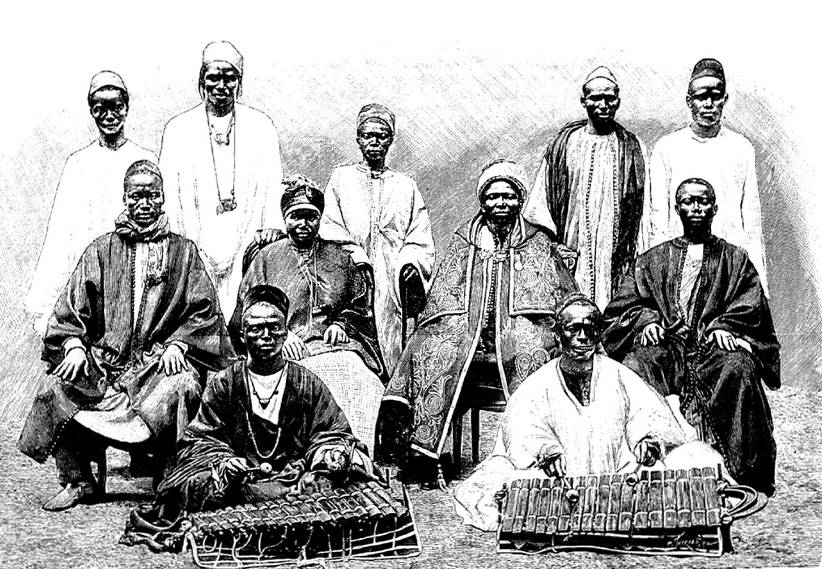
- « Leroi africain Dinah Salifou, la reine et les personnages de leur suite » (1889)

Roi des Nalous
- In office 1885–1890
- Preceded by: Youra Tawel

Personal details
- Born: Mohammad Dinah Salifou Camara c.1830 Fouta Djallon
- Died: 17 October 1897 Saint-Louis du Sénégal
- Children: Ibrahima Dinah Salifou, Khaly Salifou
- Parents: Boya Salifou (father); Makoumba (mother)

Mohammad Dinah Salifou Camara (died 21 October 1897) was the last king of the Nalu people of Guinea. He is often presented as one of the great figures of resistance to colonial penetration into sub-Saharan Africa, but also has some notoriety for his noted participation at Expo 1889 in Paris. At the end of his life, he was exiled to Saint-Louis, Senegal, under house arrest, where he died in poverty. Dinah Salifou was the holder of the Légion d'honneur.

== Biography ==
Dinah Salifou was born c.1830 in Fouta Djallon, as the son of the first king of the Nalu, Boya Salifou, and Makoumba and was educated in the Muslim tradition. He first served as a minister for his predecessor and uncle, king Youra Tawel until his death. On 31 August 1885, the French colonial authorities designated him as his uncle's successor in the kingdom of Nalu (on the banks of the Nunez River in Guinea). But before his adventure in Paris, he managed what no one before him had been able to, reconciling the peoples of the Boké region (from cape Verga to the Nunez river and the îles Tristao). All the Kakandé respected him as a warrior and a king.

He was one of the only African kings of the "Rivières du Sud," if not the only one, to be invited to Paris for the Exposition Universelle (1889). He embarked with his retinue (consisting of 32 people) on the Goéland and arrived at Marseille on 25 June after a journey of several days. He was welcomed honorably at the Gare de Lyon and lodged for more than a month in a private hotel on the rue Fabert in Paris, where he became an important and sought after personality. On 7 July 1889, Dinah Salifou appeared on the front page of the illustrated supplement Petit Parisien, together with his young wife Philis and the first of their children, Ibrahima. The colonial government pampered Salifou, inviting him to the Eiffel Tower, the Parisian opera (where he met the Shah of Persia, Naser al-Din Shah Qajar, who later offered him a sabre decorated with precious jewels). Finally he was invited to the Elysée by President Sadi Carnot.

This trip to Paris was the cause of all his later problems. During his absence, war resumed in the Nunez River valley on account of his cousin Tocba. As a result of the rebellion, he allied with the king of the Fouta Djallon to get rid of all his enemies among the Nalu, Landuma and Baga who sought to replace him. Disillusion with French colonisation was growing, but Salifou continued to respect all or nearly all of his treaties with the colonists. He was betrayed and destroyed without the agreement of the Colonial government (but in accordance with the official orders of the French commandant Opigez) and deported to Saint-Louis, Senegal where he was given a residence.

After many requests for the support of the colonial government, the authorities decided it was just to assign Salifou a pension (which was to decrease by half for his son). His family settled in the house of the forced exile until he died at the military hospital of Saint-Louis on 21 October 1897.

== Legacy ==
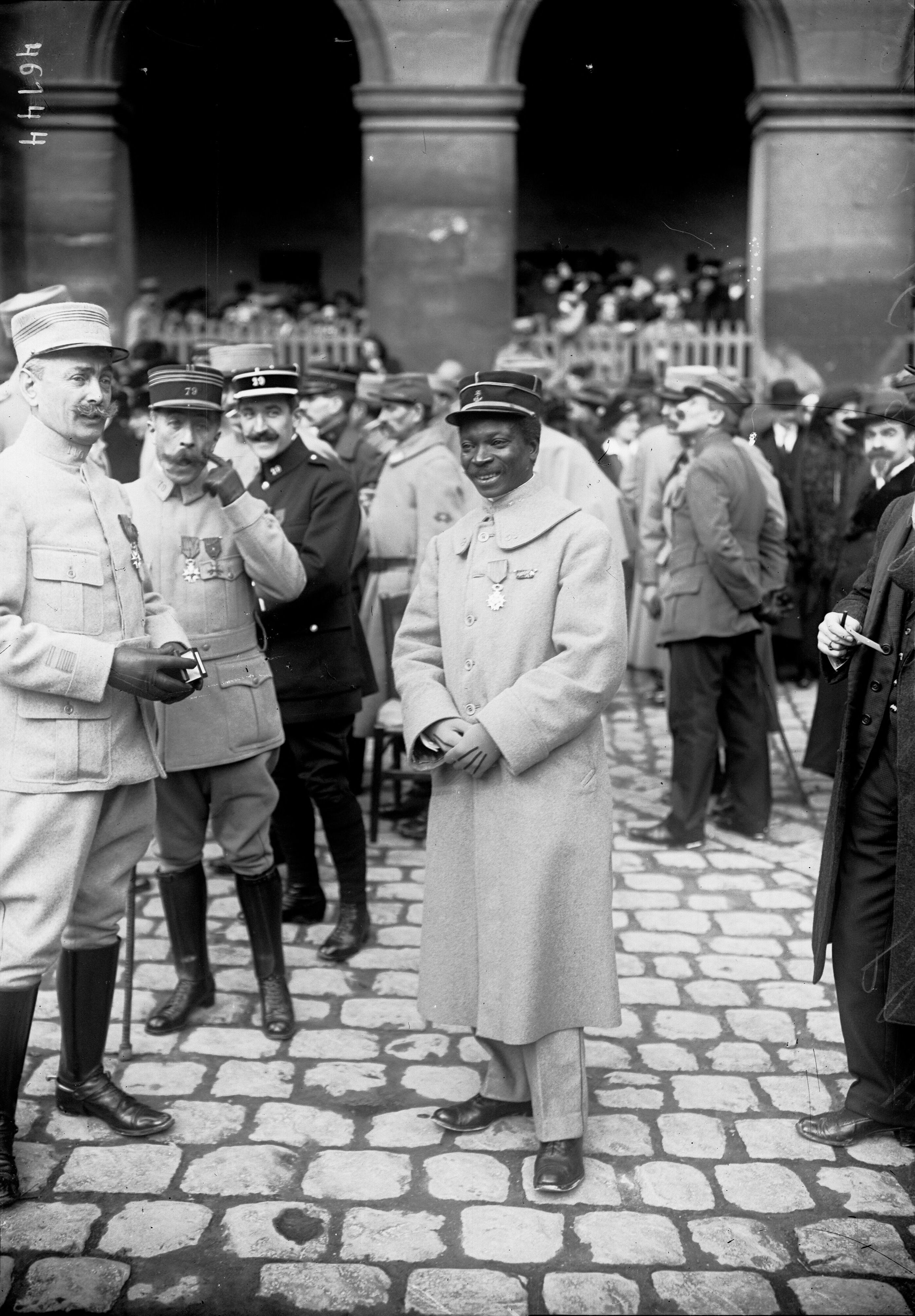
The children of Dinah Salifou decorated with the Légion d'honneur in 1916

His son educated at the École des otages he was a lieutenant of the Troupes coloniales, and served in the 8th (later renumbered as the 58th) Regiment in the 156th Infantry Division (France). Wounded twice in Champagne and in the Dardanelles, he won his stripes on the front lines and was cited for his merit at the request of the army. He received the Légion d'honneur on 20 January 1916

=== See also ===
- History of Guinea
