= Kamaby =

- Sub-prefecture and town
- Location in Guinea
- Coordinates: 12°24′N 13°25′W
- Country: Guinea
- Region: Boké Region
- Prefecture: Koundara Prefecture

Population (2014)
  - Total: 16,178
- Time zone: UTC+0 (GMT)

Kamaby is a town and sub-prefecture in the Koundara Prefecture in the Boké Region of northern Guinea, near the borders of Guinea-Bissau and Senegal. As of 2014 it had a population of 16,178 people.
