= Victor David Du Bois =

- Education: Northwestern University, Princeton University
- Occupations: Anthropologist; political scientist; educator
- Notable work: Papers 1957-1970, The Independence Movement in Guinea: A Study in African Nationalism

Victor David Du Bois (1932–1983) was an anthropologist, political scientist, educator, and art collector. He completed a Ford Foundation Fellowship and received a Ph.D. from Princeton University. His work focused on French West Africa and the Republic of Guinea.

== Biography ==
Victor David Du Bois was born in 1932.

During his undergraduate years at Northwestern University, he pursued anthropology before transitioning to political science.

As a graduate student at Princeton University, Du Bois completed a Ford Foundation Fellowship in African studies from 1959 to 1960 where he completed field work on Guinea. His doctoral research at Princeton University resulted in the completion of a thesis centered on Guinea, ultimately earning him his Ph.D. in 1962. The culmination of his scholarly efforts, "The Independence Movement in Guinea: A Study in African Nationalism," was published through Princeton University ProQuest Dissertations Publishing in the same year. In his thesis, Du Bois discusses the people of Guinea and the tribes that inhabited different regions which included the Susu and Nalu of lower Guinea and the Fula in the mountain regions.

In 1962, Du Bois began documenting progress and events in Sub-Saharan Africa as a worker with the American Universities Field Staff. Du Bois actively engaged in Guinea's political sphere, forging connections through correspondence and interviews with various African officials and leaders. As an educator, Du Bois has lectured considerably and wrote many works on new African nations and politics. His contributions took the form of numerous recorded documents and field reports. His collection of manuscripts, titled "Papers 1957-1970", is housed at the Amistad Research Center.

Du Bois collected many African art pieces firsthand from the creators and users of the items while serving for the United States Government during his time in Africa. The Appleton Museum of Art later purchased a majority of the works.

== Selected works ==
- Victor David Du Bois. (1957). "Papers 1957-1970."
- Victor David Du Bois. (1962). "The Independence Movement in Guinea: A Study in African Nationalism," PhD dissertation (Princeton University, Ann Arbor, MI: University Microfilms, 1962).
- Victor David Du Bois (1963). "The Trial of Mamadou Dia, Dakar 1963. Part I: Background of the Case" American Universities Field Staff Reports. West Africa Series, Vol. VI No. 6 (Senegal), pp. 1-8.
