= Mbulungish language =

Rio Nunez language of Guinea

Mbulungish
- Native to: Guinea
- Native speakers: (5000 cited 1998)
- Language family: Niger–Congo?: ? Atlantic–Congo; Rio Nunez; Mbulungish

Language codes
- ISO 639-3: mbv
- Glottolog: mbul1258
- ELP: Mbulungish

- People: bu-lɔŋic
- Language: ci-lɔŋic

Mbulungish is a Rio Nunez language of Guinea. Its various names include Baga Foré, Baga Monson, Black Baga, Bulunits, Longich, Monchon, Monshon. Wilson (2007) also lists the names Baga Moncõ. The language is called Ciloŋic (ci-lɔŋic) by its speakers, who refer to themselves as the Buloŋic (bu-lɔŋic).

As one of the two Rio Nunez languages of Guinea, its closest relative is Baga Mboteni.

== Geographical distribution ==
Mbulungish is spoken in 22 coastal villages in Kanfarandé according to Ethnologue.

According to Fields (2008:33-34), Mbulungish is spoken in an area to the south of the Nunez River that includes the town of Monchon. Mboteni and Sitem are spoken to the north of Mbulungish.
