= Mboteni language =

Endangered Rio Nunez language of Guinea

Mboteni
- Baga Pokur
- Native to: Guinea
- Region: coastal villages of Binari and Mboteni
- Ethnicity: 3,000 (no date)
- Native speakers: 3,700 (2015)
- Language family: Niger–Congo?: ? Atlantic–Congo; Rio Nunez; Mboteni
- Dialects: Baga Mboteni; Baga Binari
- Writing system: Unwritten

Language codes
- ISO 639-3: bcg
- Glottolog: baga1275
- ELP: Baga Binari; Baga Mboteni

Mboteni, also known as Baga Mboteni, Baga Binari, or Baga Pokur, is an endangered Rio Nunez language spoken in the coastal Rio Nunez region of Guinea. Speakers who have gone to school or work outside their villages are bilingual in Pokur and the Mande language Susu.

Pokur has lost the noun-class concord found in its relatives.

== Geographical distribution ==
According to Fields (2008:33-34), Mboteni is spoken exclusively in the two villages of Mboteni and Binari on a peninsula south of the mouth of the Nunez River. Mboteni speakers are surrounded by Sitem speakers.

Wilson (2007), based on his field reports from the 1950s, reported that Baga Mboteni (called Pukur by the speakers) was spoken on Binari Island by two clans that were hostile to each other.

== Classification ==
As one of the two Rio Nunez languages of Guinea, its closest relative is Mbulungish.

Despite the name, Baga Mboteni is not one of the Baga languages, though speakers are ethnically Baga. The language is instead most closely related to Nalu and Mbulungish, though it shares a low percentage of cognate vocabulary with them.

== Phonology ==
Consonants
	Labial	Alveolar	Palatal	Velar
Plosive	p b	t d	c ɟ	k g
Fricative	f	s		x
Nasal	m	n	ɲ	ŋ
Approximant	w	r, l	j	

Vowels
	Front	Central	Back
High	i		u
Mid-high	e	ə	o
Mid-low	ɛ		ɔ
Low		a	
