= Youkounkoun =

- Sub-prefecture and town
- Location in Guinea
- Coordinates: 12°32′N 13°08′W
- Country: Guinea
- Region: Boké Region
- Prefecture: Koundara Prefecture

Population (2014)
  - Total: 7,804

Youkounkoun is a town in northwestern Guinea near the border with Senegal. It is located in Koundara Prefecture in the Boké Region. As of 2014 it had a population of 7,804 people.

A French post was constructed in March to April 1903.
