= Kolaboui =

- Sub-prefecture and town
- Location in Guinea
- Coordinates: 10°53′N 14°22′W
- Country: Guinea
- Region: Boké Region
- Prefecture: Boké Prefecture

Population (2014)
  - Total: 57,251
- Time zone: UTC+0 (GMT)

Kolaboui is a town and sub-prefecture in the Boké Prefecture in the Boké Region of western Guinea. As of 2014 it had a population of 57,251 people.
