= Termesse =

- Sub-prefecture and town
- Location in Guinea
- Coordinates: 12°19′N 12°47′W
- Country: Guinea
- Region: Boké Region
- Prefecture: Koundara Prefecture

Population (2014)
  - Total: 15,264
- Time zone: UTC+0 (GMT)

Termesse is a town and sub-prefecture in the Koundara Prefecture in the Boké Region of northern Guinea, near the border of Senegal. As of 2014 it had a population of 15,264 people.
