= Koundara =

- Sub-prefecture and town
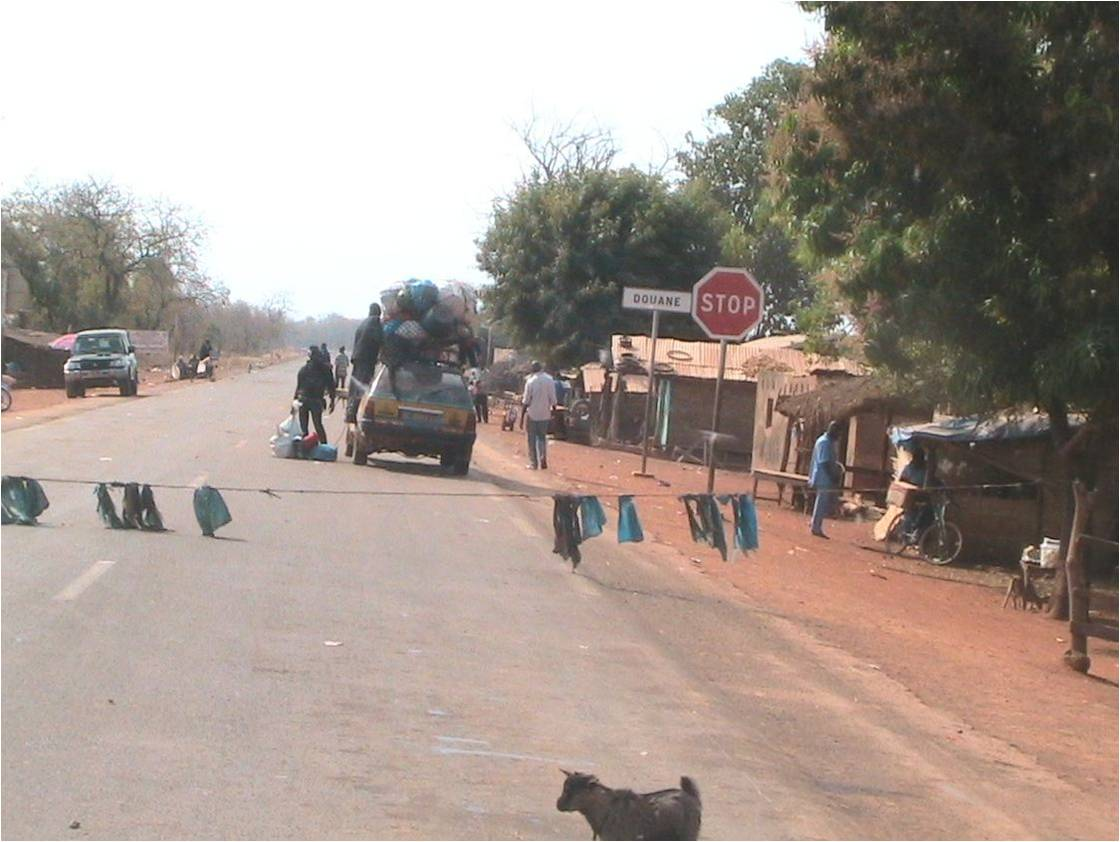

- Location in Guinea
- Coordinates: 12°29′N 13°18′W
- Country: Guinea
- Region: Boké Region
- Prefecture: Koundara Prefecture

Population (2014 census)
  - Total: 27,433

Koundara is a town in northwestern Guinea, near the borders of Guinea-Bissau and Senegal. It is the capital of Koundara Prefecture. The town is served by Sambailo Airport. As of 2014 it had a population of 27,433 people.

== Climate ==
Koundara has a tropical savanna climate (Köppen climate classification Aw), with the temperature being hot year round, and with a wet and dry season. On 29 March 2017, Koundara recorded a temperature of 45.0 °C (113.0 °F), which is the highest temperature to have ever been recorded in Guinea.

Climate data for Koundara (1991–2020)
Month	Jan	Feb	Mar	Apr	May	Jun	Jul	Aug	Sep	Oct	Nov	Dec	Year
Mean daily maximum °C (°F)	35.3 (95.5)	37.9 (100.2)	39.8 (103.6)	40.7 (105.3)	39.3 (102.7)	35.0 (95.0)	32.1 (89.8)	31.3 (88.3)	32.0 (89.6)	33.4 (92.1)	34.4 (93.9)	34.5 (94.1)	35.5 (95.9)
Daily mean °C (°F)	25.2 (77.4)	27.9 (82.2)	30.5 (86.9)	32.0 (89.6)	31.7 (89.1)	28.9 (84.0)	27.0 (80.6)	26.5 (79.7)	26.7 (80.1)	27.5 (81.5)	26.7 (80.1)	24.6 (76.3)	27.9 (82.2)
Mean daily minimum °C (°F)	15.0 (59.0)	18.0 (64.4)	21.2 (70.2)	23.4 (74.1)	24.0 (75.2)	22.9 (73.2)	21.9 (71.4)	21.6 (70.9)	21.4 (70.5)	21.7 (71.1)	19.1 (66.4)	14.4 (57.9)	20.4 (68.7)
Average precipitation mm (inches)	0.1 (0.00)	0.0 (0.0)	0.5 (0.02)	0.7 (0.03)	34.1 (1.34)	142.1 (5.59)	229.4 (9.03)	333.1 (13.11)	293.4 (11.55)	89.9 (3.54)	6.2 (0.24)	0.2 (0.01)	1,129.7 (44.48)
Average precipitation days (≥ 1.0 mm)	0.0	0.0	0.0	0.1	3.2	9.9	14.2	18.7	17.7	7.1	0.5	0.1	71.5
Source: NOAA
