= Kanfarandé, Guinea =

- Location in Guinea
- Coordinates: 10°50′N 14°33′W
- Country: Guinea
- Region: Boke Region
- Prefecture: Boke Prefecture

Kanfarande, Guinea or Saint Eugenie or Victoria is a small village located in the Boke Prefecture in the Republic of Guinea. The village has a population of 3062 and was historically ruled by local chiefs who became chiefs hereditarily. The Thomases or "Towel" or "Camaras" family (who were originally from Guinea-Bissau) ruled from the 19th century onwards, and one of the most famous Thomases in the region was Sheku Thomas (whose grandfather was from Guinea-Bissau).

== Reaching Kanfarande ==
There are three primary means of reaching the village of Kanfarande:

-A road vehicle may be taken from nearby Boke or Kamsar to Kolabui to a small port Katounou (45 min). From Katounou a dugout canoe will cross the ocean inlet either to Kanfarande or to nearby Kounsougou depending on the direction of the current and the tide (30-60 min). This is the most preferred means of entering or leaving the village by most Guineans.

-A motor boat can sometimes be chartered directly from Kamsar (60 min). This option is much more expensive and not reliable.

-During the dry season a road vehicle can sometimes be taken from Boke to Kanfarande (120 min). The road is very poor and vomiting is frequent among passengers if airflow in the vehicle is poor. This option should not be attempted during the rainy season as most of the roads become covered in water and sometimes fast moving streams up to 1.5 meters deep cross the roads.

== Education ==
Kanfarande is home to the central middle school or "college" for the sub-prefecture, teaching 7th-10th grades. No high school or "lycee" is present in the sub-prefecture. As of recent years, the college has taught in excess of 300 students annually. Most of the students come from neighboring villages, a very large number from villages in the "islands" of the area. These students typically live with host families in Kanfarande and return to their home villages during breaks and holidays. In recent years, the number of students had drastically increased with Sine Magassouba as principal of the school. Under Magassouba's direction, a new school building was constructed with the financial aide of the Canadian Embassy. Most students graduating from 10th grade and passing the nation exam, the Brevee, attend high school at either Kolabui, Kamsar, Boke, or Conakry.

A much larger number of elementary schools exist in villages throughout the sub-prefecture.

== Economy ==
As a coastal city, fishing is critical to the economy of Kanfarande. The fish can typically be preserved through smoking and sold locally or in larger markets in Kamsar, Boke or Kolabui. The original colonial port has recently been restored.

There is a weekly, small market in Kanfarande where very basic products and produce can be purchased. The market is generally not the primary place of commerce for most inhabitants, however. Instead villagers typically visit each other's homes directly to purchase goods or commute to a market at a larger outside city. Common boutiques also exist, but are not numerous.

== Chiefs of Kanfarande ==
- The Thomases
