= Tanéné =

Tanéné may refer to:

- Tanéné, Boké, Guinea
- Tanéné, Dubréka, Guinea
