= Koundara Prefecture =

Coordinates: 12°29′02″N 13°18′08″W

- Prefecture
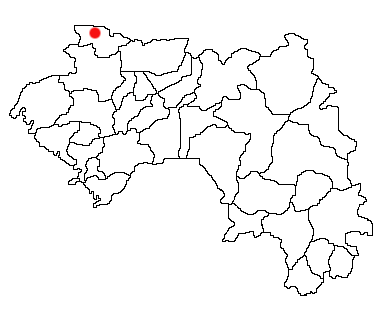
- Location of Koundara Prefecture and seat in Guinea.
- Country: Guinea
- Region: Boké Region
- Capital: Koundara

Area
  - Total: 5,238 km^{2} (2,022 sq mi)

Population (2014 census)
  - Total: 130,205
  - Density: 24.86/km^{2} (64.38/sq mi)
- Time zone: UTC+0 (Guinea Standard Time)

Koundara is a prefecture located in the Boké Region of Guinea. The capital is Koundara. The prefecture covers an area of 5,238 km^{2} (2,022 sq mi) and has a population of 130,205.

== Capital ==
Koundara town is served by Sambailo Airport. As of 2014 it had a population of 27,433 people.

== Sub-prefectures ==
The prefecture is divided administratively into 7 sub-prefectures:

1. Koundara-Centre
2. Guingan
3. Kamaby
4. Sambailo
5. Saréboido
6. Termesse
7. Youkounkoun
