= Saréboido =

- Sub-prefecture and town
- Location in Guinea
- Coordinates: 12°24′N 13°32′W
- Country: Guinea
- Region: Boké Region
- Prefecture: Koundara Prefecture

Population (2014)
  - Total: 33,700
- Time zone: UTC+0 (GMT)

Saréboido is a town and sub-prefecture in the Koundara Prefecture in the Boké Region of northern Guinea, near the border of Guinea-Bissau. As of 2014 it had a population of 33,700 people.
