= BKJ =

BKJ may refer to:

- Barkur railway station, Barkur, India, Indian Railways station code
- Beckenham Junction station, London, National Rail station code
- Boké Baralande Airport, Boké, Guinea, IATA airport code
- Pande language, Central African Republic, ISO 639-3 code
