= Guingan =

- Sub-prefecture and town
- Location in Guinea
- Coordinates: 12°23′N 12°56′W
- Country: Guinea
- Region: Boké Region
- Prefecture: Koundara Prefecture

Population (2014)
  - Total: 14,347
- Time zone: UTC+0 (GMT)

Guingan is a town and sub-prefecture in the Koundara Prefecture in the Boké Region of northern Guinea, near the border of Senegal. As of 2014 it had a population of 14,347 people.
