= Landuma people =

Ethnic group in Africa

Landuma Landoma Landouma
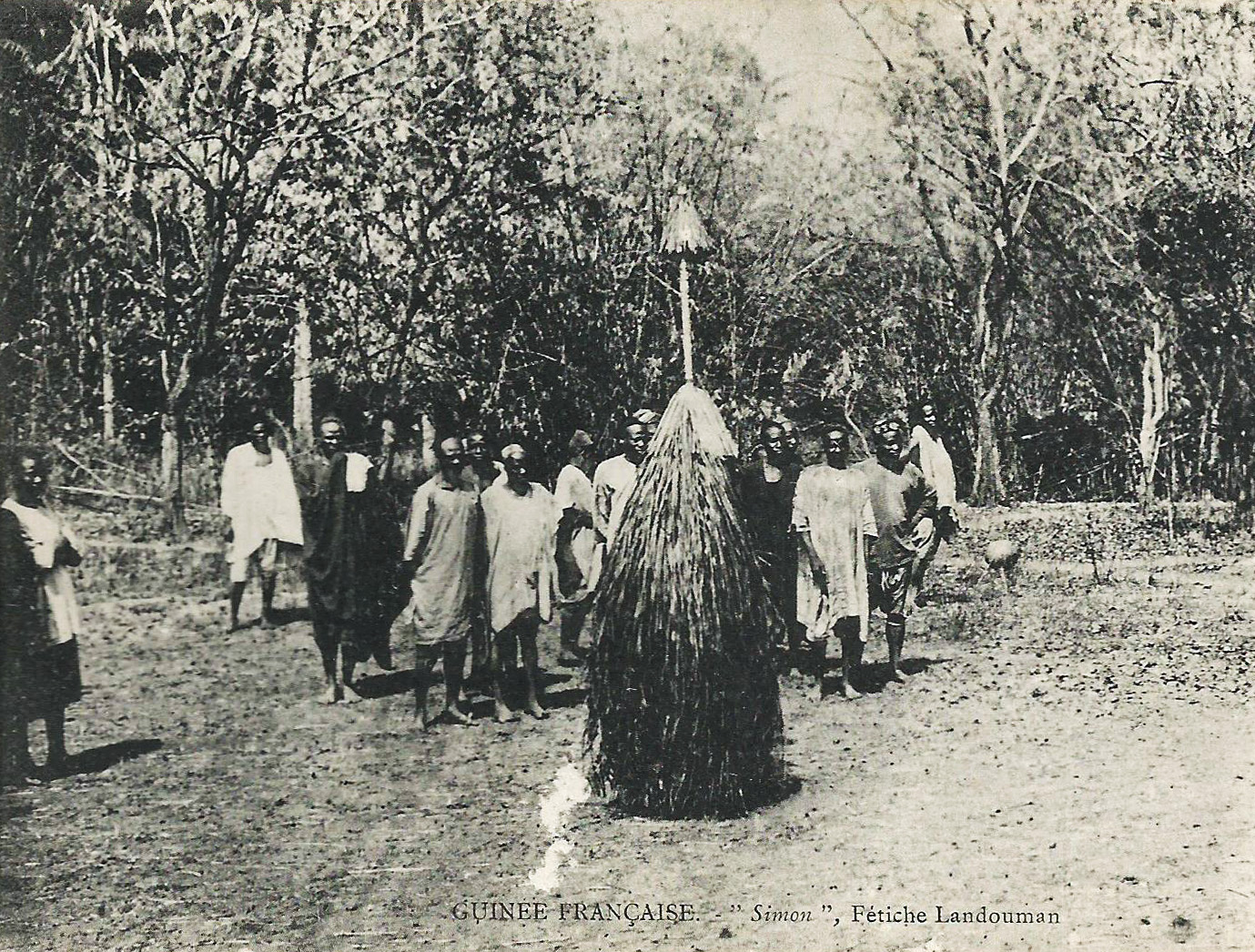

Total population
- ~30,000

Regions with significant populations
- Guinea: 26,000
- Guinea Bissau: 4,000

Languages
- Landoma

Religion
- Majority Traditional African Religion Minority Islam

Related ethnic groups
- Nalou people, Baga people, Temne people

The Landuma also called Landoma, Landima, Landouma, Cocoli, Kokoli, Tiapi, or Tyapi are an African people who live primarily in Guinea, in the area of the Upper Nunez. They have been described as "pre-Mandingas", as they settled in the region before the arrival of the Mande people. In this respect Walter Rodney places them alongside the Nalu people, the Baga people and the Temne people.
