= Nepen Diakha =

Place in Senegal

Baunez ridge, Nepen Diakha
- Location within Senegal

Highest point
- Elevation: 648 m (2,126 ft)
- Coordinates: 12°22′24″N 12°32′37″W

Geography
- Location: Near Nepin Peul, Senegal

Nepen Diakha is a locality situated in the Kédougou Region, Senegal. The highest point of the country is located 2.7 km southeast of Nepen Diakha on Baunez ridge defining the border with Guinea. There is a 648 metres (2,126 ft) above sea level spot height, on the 1983, very detailed, five-meter contour interval 1:25,000 scale topographic map sheet 2049I SE produced by the joint Senegal-Guinea Organization for the Development of the River Gambia with "topography by photogrammetric methods" from US-flown aerial images. SRTM data shows a 642-meter elevation here.

The village of Nepin Peul is the closest locality to this ridge.

The coordinates of the highest point of Senegal are 12°22′24″N 12°32′37″W.

== See also ==
- Geography of Senegal
- List of countries by highest point
