= Boké Baralande Airport =

Airport in Boké, Guinea

Boké Baralande Airport Aéroport de Boké Baralande (French)
- IATA: BKJ; ICAO: GUOK

Summary
- Airport type: Public
- Serves: Boké
- Elevation AMSL: 164 ft / 50 m
- Coordinates: 10°58′00″N 14°16′50″W

Map
- Location of the airport in Guinea

Runways
Direction	Length		Surface
Direction	m	ft	Surface
02/20	1,540	5,052	Dirt
- Source: Google Maps GCM

Boké Baralande Airport (IATA: BKJ, ICAO: GUOK) is an airport serving Boké, the capital of the Boké Region of Guinea.

The Boke non-directional beacon (Ident: OK) is located on the field.

== See also ==
- Transport in Guinea
- List of airports in Guinea
