= Guinea–Senegal border =

International border

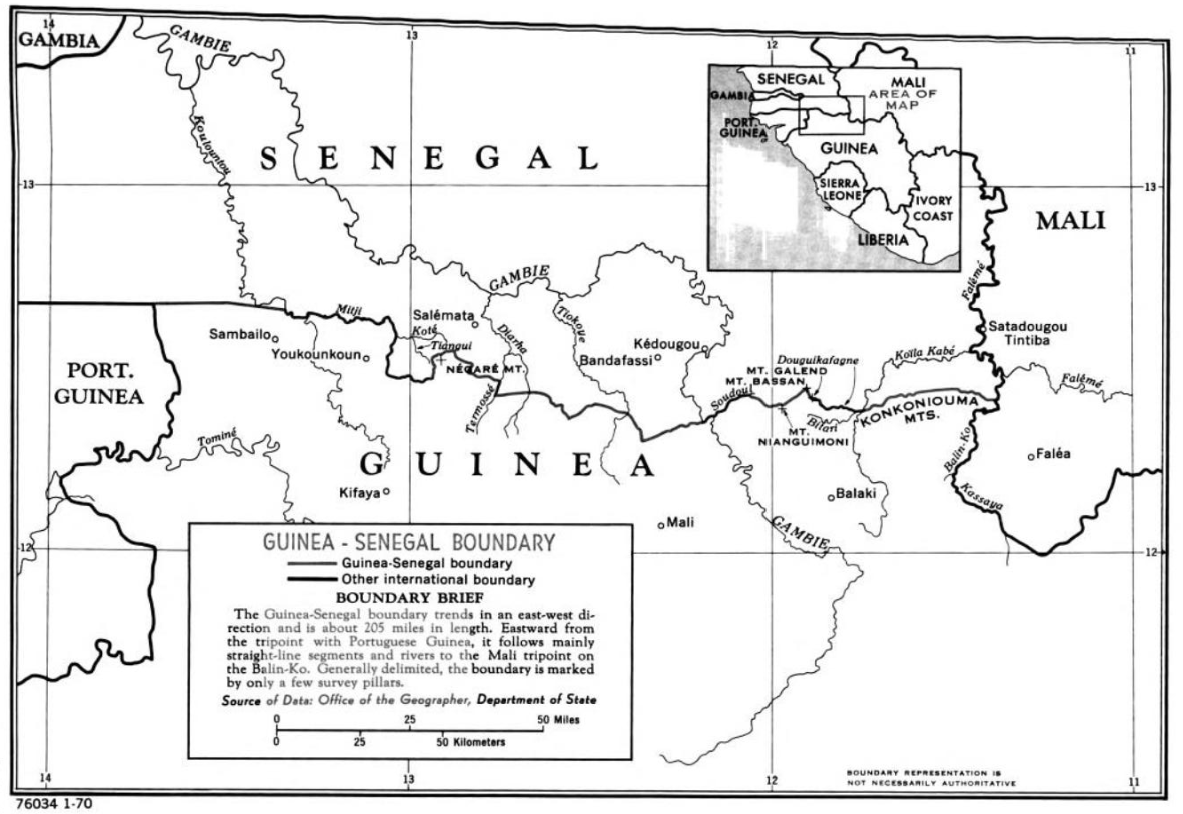
Map of the Guinea-Senegal border

The Guinea–Senegal border is 363 km (or 225 mi) in length and runs from the tripoint with Guinea-Bissau in the west to the tripoint with Mali in the east.

== Description ==
The border starts in the west at the tripoint with Guinea-Bissau, proceeding eastwards via a series of irregular overland lines and some rivers (notably the Mitji, Termossé and Soudoul), before terminating at the Malian tripoint in the east on the Balinko river.

== History ==
France had begun settling in the region of modern Senegal in the 17th century, later annexing the coast of what is now Guinea in the late 19th century as the Rivières du Sud colony. The latter area was constituted as French Guinea in 1893, with both it and Senegal later becoming part of the French West Africa colony. A border between them was delimited in a French arrêté of 15 November 1898, being described in more detail by a further arrêté of 27 February 1915, before being finalised at its current limit by a decree of 13 December 1933.

As the movement for decolonisation grew after the Second World War, France gradually granted more political rights and representation to their sub-Saharan African colonies, culminating in the granting of broad internal autonomy to French West Africa in 1958 within the framework of the French Community. In 1958 Guinea gained independence, followed by Senegal in 1960.

== Settlements near the border ==
=== Guinea ===
- Youkounkoun

=== Senegal ===
- Nepen Diakha
- Fongolembi
- Niagalankome
