= Rio Nunez languages =

Pair of Niger–Congo languages

Rio Nunez
- Nunez River
- Geographic distribution: mouth of the Nunez River, Guinea
- Linguistic classification: Niger–Congo?: Atlantic–Congo?; Rio Nunez
- Subdivisions: Mbulungish; Baga Mboteni

Language codes
- Glottolog: nalu1241 Rio Nunez with Nalu

The Rio Nunez (Rio Nuñez) or Nunez River languages constitute a pair of Niger–Congo languages, Mbulungish and Baga Mboteni. They are spoken at the mouth of the Nunez River in Guinea, West Africa.

The Rio Nunez languages have been studied by Fields (2001), but otherwise remain sparsely documented.

== Classification ==
The two Rio Nunez languages do not subgroup with the Nalu language, contrary to prior classifications. Previously, Fields had proposed a Coastal group consisting of Mbulungish, Mboteni, and Nalu that she considered to be distinct from the surrounding Mel languages. The grouping in its current scope was proposed by Güldemann (2018).

The Rio Nunez languages are currently unclassified within Niger-Congo, and whether or not they are part of the Atlantic languages is also uncertain.

== History ==
Speakers of Rio Nunez languages had cultivated African rice (Oryza glaberrima) for thousands of years on the swampy coast of Guinea. Mel speakers were later arrivals on the Guinean coast, as the Proto-Mel homeland is located in the north-central highlands of Sierra Leone just to the south of the Lesser Scarcies River, rather than on the coast (Fields 2008:83).

Today, both languages are endangered. As of 1998, fewer than 100 people spoke Baga Mboteni fluently, while Mbulungish had fewer than 500 speakers, although both speech communities had a few thousand people. The language endangerment is caused by a shift to Susu, a Mande language that is the lingua franca of coastal Guinea (Fields 2008:33–35).

== Vocabulary ==
=== Basic ===
Comparison of basic vocabulary words of the Rio Nunez languages, and also Nalu, by Fields (2004):

Language	eye	ear	nose	tooth	tongue	mouth	blood	bone	tree	water	eat	name
Mbulungish	ʃɛt	nop	pɛn	tet / ʃi-tet	lim	tul	yel	mboi	ti, ki-ti	tɔ	romba	yin
Mboteni	tʃir / si-kir	nʊf	ndo, ndoŋdo	tʊl / sʊ-rʊl	lom	sul	yɛla	loŋ / sa-loŋ	tili, li	sɔ	lamal	yin
Nalu	n-cɛt	n-nɛw	ɲin	m-fef / a-fef	n-lem, rim	n-sol	ɲ-yaak / a-yaak	n-hol	n-ti / a-ti	ngɔl / a-gɔl, ŋol	rɛp tahan	riiɸ

Comparison of basic vocabulary words of the Rio Nunez languages, and also Nalu, by Wilson (2007):

Language	eye	ear	nose	tooth	tongue	mouth	blood	bone	tree	water	name; surname
Baga Fore / Mbulungish	cet	ɔ-nɔp	pen	ki-tet	lem	tul	bɔl				
Baga Mboteni	cír / si-	nǎf / sä-; ɛ-nop	ndɔŋ / -lo	tǎl / sǎ-r	ɛ-ləm / a-	sùl / su-	yelã, yɛl-əŋ	lə̀ŋ / sa-	lí / ti-	sɔ̀, a-sɔ	
Nalu	n-cɛt / a-	nɛw / a-	nin / a-	n-feθ / a-	rim / a-	n-sul	naak	wol	n-ti / a-	a-ŋɔl	riiθ / a-

Vocabulary shared with Atlantic languages:

English	Mbulungish	Mboteni	Nalu
four	nɛŋ	na	bi-nan
head	kap	kap	n-ki
ear	nop	nʌf	n-nɛw
eye	syɛt / syi-syɛt	eir / si-kir	n-cɛt / a-cɛt
mouth	tul	sul	n-sol / a-sol
tongue	lim	lɤm	n-lem
breast / milk	m-bin	mban	m-bem
hand / arm	tɛ		n-tɛ
leg	luŋ		tɛŋk
bone	mbol / tyʌ-mbol		nhol / a-hol
moon / month	bel	pʌl	m-bilaŋ
tree	ti	li	n-ti
dog	but	wur	maa-bet
egg	in		n-yin

Innovated vocabulary differing from Atlantic languages:

English	Mbulungish	Mboteni	Nalu
man	mɛ-sil	o-kw-cel / ngwɛ-cɛl	nlam-cel
dirty / black	bali	a-val	m-balax
long	lani		m-lanna
cold	hon		m-hon
to come	batɛ		m-ba
to kill	ka-rame	lama	m-rama
to bite	nyɛt	nyera	m-ŋateŋ
to sit	ŋo	ŋon	m-ɲɔh
to die	ŋu-rip		n-ref

Some Mbulungish and Mboteni innovated words that differ from Nalu and other surrounding languages (Fields 2008:74):

English	Mbulungish	Mboteni
mosquito	ɔ-bo / ɔ-bolleŋ	a-bɔ
crab (generic)	i-nep, e-nep, ɛnippel / ɛ-nippel	a-nep / a-neppel
type of crab	i-laŋ / ayel-laŋ	a-laŋ / alaŋŋel

=== Cultural ===
A rich set of rice agriculture-related vocabulary in Rio Nunez languages has been documented by Edda L. Fields-Black (2008).

Meaning	Mbulungish	Mboteni	Nalu	Sitem
salt	mbes	ɔ-mbɛl		mer (< Proto-Atlantic *-mer)
oil palm	yiis		m-siis / a-siis	
seasonal stream	bɔlɔŋ / cubɔlɔŋ; para / cipparaŋ; ipal / appalleŋ	pɔl	m-tɛsɛ / a-tɛsɛ	
small seasonal stream	masaleŋ	ilex / alexeŋ		
tree used to fabricate the short fulcrum shovel and the shovel handle	ki-mal		m-silaa / a-silaa	
red mangrove (Rhizophora racemosa) used to fabricate the short or long fulcrum shovel	ki-kiɲc / ɛ-kiɲcil; ku-wɔl / a-wɔlleŋ	e-ma, ɛ-ma / a-ma	m-mak / a-mak	a-kinc / kinc
rice cultivated in the red mangroves	malɔ bɛ kinycilpon / cimmalɔŋ bɛ kiɲcilpon	for ɛma		
white mangroves (Avicennia africana)	yɔp / ki-yɔp	e-wɛleŋ, weleŋ / awelleŋ	m-yɔɔf / a-yɔɔf	kopir / copir
rice cultivated in the white mangroves	malɔ biyɔppon / cimalɔ ciyɔppon	maafer		
order given by the elder to begin fieldwork		fɔfuduŋ		kusɔkɔp
enough water in the mangrove field to begin fieldwork		asofɔilawola		dumun dɛncmɛ dukubora
order given by the elder to stop fieldwork		senden afanc		aŋkatefer
harvest ceremony (pre-Islam)		xesara lemma		kuwurɛ malɔ
order given to begin the harvest		ndebe loŋŋon		kitɛl kufɔlɔ
fulcrum shovel handle	kur capɔn / cukurkappon; ki-ti akɔp / ɛ-ti akɔp	ndii kɔp	m-kuŋgbala / a-kuŋgbala	
small pieces of wood used to reinforce shovel foot when tying it to handle (could be bamboo or the stalk of the red mangrove)	wac / cuwacel	i-xare / aŋ-xare	m-ba iŋkifɔhlasen / a-ba iŋkifɔhlasen m-caanahsen / a-caanahsen	mɛ-kɪnc
shovel blade	a-fenc / e-fenccel		ma-fanc / a-fanc	
sculpted blade of fulcrum shovel	kɔp nyetelpon	i-cel / aɲ-cel		
to sharpen the fulcrum shovel blade	a-fenc gbat	inʊmi cel	m-namtah / a-namtah	
vine used to attach shovel foot to handle	ntel / ɛteelleŋ	aɲcel	m-nintamp / a-nintamp	dɛ-tɛmpa / s-tɛmpa
to clear the red mangroves to make the large dike	ɛ-cɛp	asaɓɛn wucer akuvɔr		
to burn the rice hay before the rainy season		muxalɔmppasinal		kɪcɔs yikaya malɔ
to trace the grand dike	ki-bereŋ wurtɛ	wac nxɔfɔrn		
to cut the earth with the shovel to make the dike	abereŋ yɛkɛt / cibereŋ yɛkɛt	ebaxacakca		
to cut weeds and separate two ridges		awul	m-sɔɔaŋ / a-sɔɔaŋ	kɪ-cɛs
to walk on the weeds to diminish their size		i-camanasen	ma-daka / a-daka	kɪ-namp
to cut the weeds on the bottom before turning soil with the shovel	iŋcɛpel mɔlɔ inpenna; a-cappa		ma-cɛsa / a-cɛsa	kɪ-cɛs yika
first turning of the weeds and soil with fulcrum shovel	bɔŋwaca; ki-cɛp / a-cappa; a-beret / ɛ-beret	afanc	m-kes / a-kes	
one shovelful of earth		for	ma-bees / a-bees	damba / samba
to walk on weeds for a second time		elɛrpɛrnanasɔxɔl	m-ŋakten / a-ŋakten	
to tuck weeds into the soil with hands or feet	walta	ayixil; ibaxanas (feet are used in the fields); ibaxayekel (hands are used in the nursery)		kɪ-nas anɛk
second turning of the soil to cover the weeds with fulcrum shovel	bɔŋkubut; awupur		m-wupur / a-wupur	
short fulcrum shovel	ki-taŋgbaŋ / ci-taŋgbaŋŋel	aŋ-kumbɛl; faa-aŋkumbɛl (for repairing the dikes and other small jobs in the field and around the village)	ma-kumbal / a-kumbal	
long fulcrum shovel (2 to 4 meters long)	kɔp kokilannɛ / ci-kɔppel kokilannɛ	ɛ-lar (for use when turning the earth for the first time)	m-kɔp lanna / a-kɔp lanna	
ancestral fulcrum shovel used without metal blade		kɔp amaŋkre cel / su kɔpamaŋ i-cel		
dike / mound	ki-bereŋ / ci-bereŋ	axɔɓɛrn / aŋxɔɓɛrn	ma-bɔŋɛn / a-bɔŋɛn	
ridge	ɛ-nɛk / ki-nɛk	e-nɛk / a-nɛk	ma-nɛk / a-nɛɛk	a-nɛk
furrow	ku-bont / a-bontol	e-won / a-won	m-sumuunt / a-sumuunt	
to sow in rows	a-sappa	suk mmao	ma-cɛɛp	kɪ-cɛp tɛcɪr
to sow in the fields	a-meŋker	mbuŋma asina		
to sow by broadcasting	malɔ pɛn	mboo mmao	ma-yara	kɪ-glal ka malɔ
to sow directly in the field		afur mmao	ma-yaara	
to sow directly, done tightly		axɔfɛl	m-dafeet / a-dafeet	kɪ-fɪlfɪl; kɪ-gbɛɛ malɔ
to sow directly, done tightly and then to pull up some seedlings and leave some	malɔ seŋ	mɓɛlmmalon		
to sow directly, done loosely	malɔ bɛ kabatɛŋŋɛ biliŋmpon	maasɛpna	m-yolyolen / a-yolyolen	
to sow on flat land	bɔkitefɛ	maaxɔfɔla		
first rice nursery		tabla mbuŋŋund kamao		kɪsɪmɪ kɪɪnɪkicɔkɔ cɔkɔ
second rice nursery		mbuŋna asenden		kɪsɪmɪ kamɛrɛŋ
too much water beneath the rice nursery		asoyokokinin mmao		kiŋkankla dumun
normal cycle of the rice nursery		fam mmao		ocomas
to wash bottom of germinated rice seedlings before transplanting		abɔxɔr mmao		ki-yaak malɔ
to attach germinated rice seedlings		ɛra mmao		ku-kutus malɔ
to put the attached and germinated rice seedlings in water before transplanting		ndepman asɔla		aŋgbɛ midirɛ
to cover the seeds with banana leaves	malɔ gbopret / cimmallɔŋ gbepret	wofor mmao		kukumpus malɔ
germinated seedlings	ɛ-tiebelaŋŋa ɛcɔlcen	axɔfɛl	m-kicɛɛpa / a-kicɛɛpa	malɔ mopoŋ
seedlings that did not germinate	malɔ tɔti / cim-mallɔŋtɔti; malɔ beabuwɔcɛ	maamaŋ kulum		malɔ mɛlɛcɛ
to pull up weeds with the hands	ɔtulut	iŋkur awewen		
to transplant	belaŋ ɔcɔlɛ; a-sappa	iwaaso	m–cɛɛpa	pa-cɛɛp; tøk yɔkɔ an luksɪrnɛ kɪ-bɔf mɔ
to weed after replanting		iŋkur aɓaɓɛn		kʊwas malɔ
to clean the canal to begin fieldwork		wuxucer aso		kɪfɪnc kibɔŋɛn
to open the canal	bamcaɔtɔ	imuaxurtuŋun	m-bannataŋ / a-bannataŋ	kɪ-ŋɛr
to evacuate the water when the rice is ripe		ɛbɛlaso kamato		malɔ mɔlɔl
to close the canal	wulci; ɔtɔcaŋ	caimuarumtuŋ	m-laŋŋaŋ / a-laŋŋaŋ	kɪ-ŋiri
end of the canal	bampɛtɔtipotɛ / cim-bammelpɛcitɔtipetɛ	alubana		
canal used to evacuate water from field	bampetelɔtɔ / cim-bampetɔlɔtɔ	tuŋ / suruŋ	m-tisɔɔtɔ / a-tisɔɔtɔ; m-sumunt / a-sumunt	dɪk wurɛ du mun; dobo
principal drain	kubŋkum	tuŋ / suruŋ		
secondary drain	mawuŋkummul	fatuŋ / fam suruŋ		
to guard the rice field from predators during the hungry season	a-kecek mmel		ma-lɛɛm kabafrɛ / a-lɛɛm kabafrɛ	kɪ-bum
temporary shelter in the rice field	agbɔŋk / agbɔŋkel	iŋgaɲcaŋ	ma-gbɔɔŋk kamtɔh / a-gbɔɔŋk kamtɔh	ʊ-bal dalɛ tetek
to move to the field until the harvest		ncebel asina		siŋkɔdalɛ dikidirɛ
harvest	malɔ ɛtɛl	mɓɛr	ma-bit / a-bit	kɪ-tɛl ka malɔ
to evacuate the harvested rice to the dike so that it will not get wet		yokon mal awultɔŋ		patel dikibɔŋɛn
small handful / pile of harvested rice		ɛra mmao		malɔ kɪcaka
large pile of rice arranged with the grains on the inside		maasuŋ saŋ kappa		amboc kur
to fan rice	kɔ-fuŋŋa		m-fentah [loanword from English]	kɪ-foy
to fan rice with fanner	malɔ petel	afoi mmao		kɪ-gbap malɔ
to fan rice with wind	malɔ fuŋŋa	wuluŋ mmao		kɪ-foi malɔ
rice fanner	ki-rɛbɛ / ci-rɛbɛ	kɛbei	m–dɛhɛn	kɪ-rɛbɛ / cɪ-rɛbɛ
to mill rice	ka-tampa	icɛr	ma-maθ	
to mill rice for first time	malɔ tampa	yuŋkapt mmaun		kɪ-sɛpɪr; kɪ koŋos
to mill rice for second time	malɔ bekɛbiritɛ	wuŋ ailim		anxɔ diksɛpɪt
to mill daily rations of rice with feet	malɔ ɛcɛɛk ɛsupun	sux mmao		
daily ration of rice		maalɔw / maŋŋalɔ		malɔ medi
area where rice is beaten	tɛtek kubɔrton	aɓoma	ma-tana	
to cover the rice after beating but before fanning it		wupurmaayɔŋŋɔn		pakis malɔ
to transport the rice to the granary		suŋ maarun		kɪsarɛ malɔ
rice granary for seeds				tɛlɛ pasansi
to dry the parboiled rice		fambɛn mmao aruful		kɪ cɛɛs
to distribute cooked rice for consumption		wal malɔn		kiyeres yɛɛc
calabash in which rice was served		isar mmao		pɛpɛ
wooden bowl in which rice was served		ifɛrl		po-ros / si-ros
rice is spoiled, because it was prepared with too much fire and smoke		mmambɛl fus		yɛɛc yɛntɛɛ
weeds used to reinforce the big mound	kɛp / ci-kɛppel	seɲɲel won	m-hoof / a-hoof	
water moss	a-fuc / ku-fuccel	afuɲc	m-cufran / a-cufran	kɪ-foc kadumun
new field with no mounds or ridges		avent	m-bitik / a-bitik	kɪ-pɪr
to make new ridges	abeta / abetelaŋ			
field on high ground whose soil is sandy	ɔtɔ yɛiboŋkorolɛ / ɔtɔllɔŋ yɛciboŋkoroŋ	aninannces		
field lying fallow	cakara ɛnɛkicot; bɔŋ bɛ pepiyɛcilɛ / cimboŋŋel pepiyecilɛ		m-woskamtɔh atilɛbah / a-woskamtɔh watilɛbah	
low-lying area	timbilɛ apol / citimbilɛŋŋel	iniyapɔŋ	m-cumbaaŋ / a-cumbaaŋ	
rice husk			m-kisɛɛŋŋa / a-kisɛɛŋŋa	ʊ-fɔnta / fɔtʊ
rice seed	agba agbaleŋ	axɔfɔl mmao	m-kofok ka maro / a-kofok ka maro	
threshed, unmilled rice	malɔ bipɛc / cimmalɔ ciabolɛ	maŋkul	m-maaro tabobor / a-maaro tabobor	malɔ mɔbomba
pounded rice	caaki / cicakileŋ	manduŋŋund	m-maaro ntɔɔn / a-maaro ntɔɔn	malɔ mɔsɔkɪr
rice straw	malɔ baba tampa	mamiŋ kɛlɛcɛr	m-maaro nsimaθ / a-maaro nsimaθ	malɔ mɔtɔ sɛpɪr
rice grain	caaki	maŋkul	m-maaro yaaŋka / a-maaro yaaŋka	malɔ mɛgbɪntɛ
rice broken during processing	mɛɲim / cimmɛɲim	aɲcakas	m-ɲin ka maaro / a-ɲin ka maaro	
parboiled rice	malɔ yiŋŋin / cimmalɔ yiŋŋin	aruful	m-maaro nton / a-maaro nton	malɔ mocuf / talɔ pocuf
cooked rice	ɔro	mandul	m-fɛɛf / a-fɛɛf	yɛc
rice broth made with rice flour	baxa	mbɔs ammasam; alafa	m–mɔni / a-mɔni	
rice broth made with rice	mɔni	mbɔs; asowasa	m-baha / a-baha	
to form grain	malɔ fuŋŋa		m-yeenɲcaŋ	
head of the rice plant	kapa malɔ / ciŋkapel amalɔ "literally head of rice"	kap mmao / saŋka mmao	m-ki ka mba putna / a-ki ka aba putna	do-bomp da malɔ "literally head of rice plant"
early-maturing rice variety		mabaxa	m-rɛfnaha / a-rɛfnaha	malɔ mɔkɔ mɔ nunkɛnɛ
cluster			m-tɔnsɔ / a-tɔnsɔ	kɪ-ncɔnc / ŋcɔnc
beginning of gestation		awal siŋŋapaŋŋal	m-lafkam lah / alafkam lah	malɔ mɛlɛk cor
rice in gestation period		maawul		malɔ melɛ cor
rice forming the head		maafutuŋ		malɔ kuwurus
rice plants in the same field form heads at different times		maalɔ mdafutuŋŋul		kunɔmkul malɔ
approaching the rainy season		ɛllɛ lɛpɛr		mɔlɔfɛ
rainy season	tɛmeisa	kuiyoŋ	m-tɛm kamkaak a-tɛm kamkaak	tɛm ta kɪfe
cold season	wɔɔppipepi	sɔɔ	m-hɔɔh kamcacŋah / a-hɔɔh kamcacŋah	
beginning of the rainy season	tɔ-lɔfɛ	tablɛ eleɓɛr; elɛpɛr	ma-lɔɔfɛ / a-lɔɔfɛ	
beginning of fieldwork	kitaŋkɛmɛc	sux mmao; ku-sɔk mmao		
end of the rainy season	kayɛmin / ci-kayɛmin	elɛlɛŋ		
end of the rainy season, hungry season		elɛlɛŋ; ɛlɛlaŋ	m-lank / a-lank	
hungry season	tcippelɛmpep wori	laŋ	ɲin sabɔk / ɲinnɛ sabɔk	
surveillance period		yilaŋxɔc		kɪmɔmɔn kɪbora
dry season	abanan / tɛmu abanan		m-hɔɔh kamθabraan / a-hɔɔh kamθabraan	kɪ-tɪŋ

Areal words borrowed from Mande languages such as Susu (Fields 2008:118, 150–151):

English	Mbulungish	Mboteni	Nalu
rice	malɔ	mao	maro
fonio	m-pindi / apindi	pundɛ / cu-pundɛlɛŋ	pundu, pundo
short-handled hoe	keri/ci-keri	keri / si-keri	
mound	tukunyi		m-tukuɲi / atukuɲi
fulcrum shovel (generic)	kɔp / ci-kɔppel	kɔp / su-kɔp	m-kɔp / a-kɔp
