= Tanéné, Boké =

Tanéné
- Sub-prefecture and town
- Location in Guinea
- Coordinates: 11°2′N 14°12′W
- Country: Guinea
- Region: Boké Region
- Prefecture: Boké Prefecture

Population (2014)
  - Total: 33,824
- Time zone: UTC+0 (GMT)

Tanéné is a small town and sub-prefecture in the Boké Prefecture in the Boké Region of Maritime Guinea between Boffa, Fria, and Conakry (Guinea). As of 2014 it had a population of 33,824 people.

It is a "crossroads village" built around the gas station located just after the metal bridge on the river Konkouré. The village has been growing rapidly since the construction of a bridge on the Fatala (also known as Rio Pongo downstream) in Boffa. For instance, the population of Guémèyiré on the right bank of the Rio Pongo has mainly moved to Tanéné. The economy is focused on small business generated by passengers swapping taxis.
