= Sambailo Airport =

Airport in Sambailo, Guinea

Sambailo Airport Aéroport de Sambailo (French)
- IATA: SBI; ICAO: GUSB

Summary
- Airport type: Public
- Serves: Koundara, Guinea
- Location: Sambailo
- Elevation AMSL: 295 ft / 90 m
- Coordinates: 12°34′30″N 13°21′45″W

Map
- Location of the airport in Guinea

Runways
Direction	Length		Surface
Direction	m	ft	Surface
12/30	1,500	4,921	Dirt
- Source: Google Maps GCM SkyVector

Sambailo Airport (IATA: SBI, ICAO: GUSB) is an airport serving Koundara, a town in the Boké Region of Guinea. It is 11 kilometres (6.8 mi) northwest of Koundara, at the village of Sambailo.

The Sambailo non-directional beacon (Ident: SB) is located on the field.

== See also ==
- Transport in Guinea
- List of airports in Guinea
