= Boké =

- Urban Sub-prefecture and city
- Location in Guinea
- Coordinates: 10°56′N 14°18′W
- Country: Guinea
- Region: Boké Region

Government
  - Mayor: Mohamed Tawel Camara
- Elevation: 30 m (98 ft)

Population (2014)
  - Total: 61,449

Boké is the capital city of Boké Prefecture within the Boké Region of Lower Guinea near the border with Guinea-Bissau. It is also a sub-prefecture of Guinea. Located along the Rio Nuñez which flows to its not-too-distant mouth on the Atlantic Ocean, Boké is a port. It is known for the Boké Museum, formerly a slave fort. The town is served by Boké Baralande Airport. As of 2014 the city and surrounding sub-prefecture had a population of 61,449 people.

== History ==
According to the Encyclopædia Britannica, 11th edition:

This part of the Guinea coast was made known by the Portuguese voyagers of the 15th century. In consequence, largely, of the dangers attending its navigation, it was not visited by the European traders of the 16th-18th centuries so frequently as other regions north and east, but in the Rio Pongo, at Matakong (a diminutive island near the mouth of the Forekaria), and elsewhere, slave traders established themselves, and ruins of the strongholds they built and defended with cannon, still exist (e.g., Fortin de Boké). When driven from other parts of Guinea the slavers made this difficult and little known coast one of their last resorts, and many barracoons were built in the late years of the 18th century. It was not until after the restoration of Goree to her at the close of the Napoleonic wars that France evinced any marked interest in the region. At that time the British, from their bases at the Gambia and Sierra Leone, were devoting considerable attention to these Rivières du Sud (i.e, south of Senegal) and also to the Futa Jallon. René Caillié, who started his journey to Timbuktu in 1827, did much to quicken French interest in the district, and from 1838 onward French naval officers, Bouèt-Willaumez and his successors, made detailed studies of the coast.

By 1849, the French had caused so much local resentment that France had to take over the Boké area. By 1895, it had become part of French West Africa.

== Climate ==
Boké has a tropical savanna climate (Köppen climate classification Aw).

Climate data for Boke (1991–2020)
Month	Jan	Feb	Mar	Apr	May	Jun	Jul	Aug	Sep	Oct	Nov	Dec	Year
Mean daily maximum °C (°F)	35.3 (95.5)	36.9 (98.4)	37.9 (100.2)	37.7 (99.9)	36.0 (96.8)	32.7 (90.9)	30.5 (86.9)	29.9 (85.8)	31.2 (88.2)	32.2 (90.0)	33.3 (91.9)	34.5 (94.1)	34.0 (93.2)
Daily mean °C (°F)	26.4 (79.5)	28.1 (82.6)	29.3 (84.7)	29.7 (85.5)	29.1 (84.4)	27.5 (81.5)	26.2 (79.2)	26.1 (79.0)	26.5 (79.7)	26.9 (80.4)	27.4 (81.3)	26.6 (79.9)	27.5 (81.5)
Mean daily minimum °C (°F)	17.6 (63.7)	19.3 (66.7)	20.7 (69.3)	21.7 (71.1)	22.4 (72.3)	22.3 (72.1)	21.9 (71.4)	22.2 (72.0)	21.9 (71.4)	21.6 (70.9)	21.4 (70.5)	18.7 (65.7)	21.0 (69.8)
Average precipitation mm (inches)	0.6 (0.02)	1.4 (0.06)	0.7 (0.03)	3.3 (0.13)	99.7 (3.93)	241.9 (9.52)	495.4 (19.50)	593.6 (23.37)	462.2 (18.20)	380.0 (14.96)	56.4 (2.22)	1.1 (0.04)	2,336.3 (91.98)
Average precipitation days (≥ 1.0 mm)	0.1	0.1	0.1	0.3	5.3	14.4	21.8	24.0	22.3	19.8	4.0	0.1	112.3
Average relative humidity (%)	53	58	53	55	67	76	75	82	92	78	69	58	68
Mean monthly sunshine hours	234	219	246	231	219	171	129	113	143	188	218	215	2,326
Source: NOAA (humidity, sun 1961–1990)
