= Nalu people =

Nalu Nalo Nalou
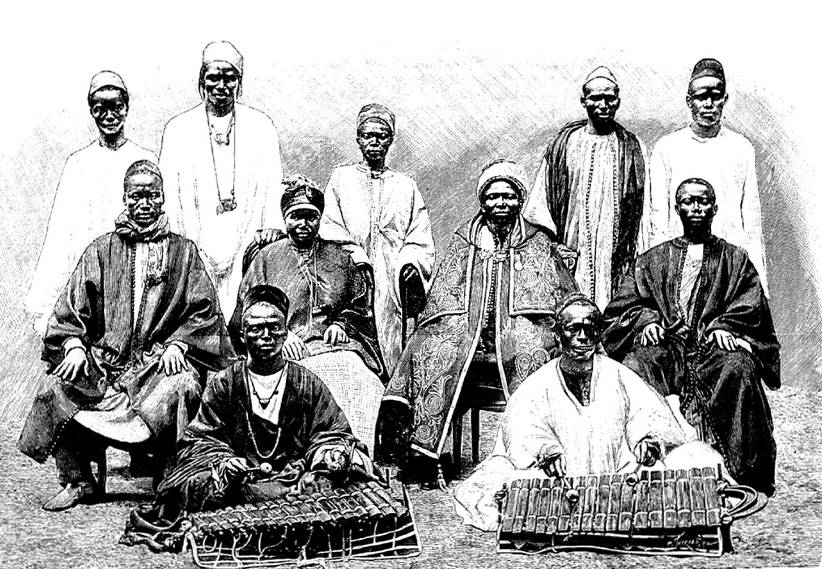

Total population
- ~20,000

Regions with significant populations
- Guinea: 11,000
- Guinea Bissau: 9,000

Languages
- Nalu

Religion
- Islam

Related ethnic groups
- Landouma people, Baga people, Temne people

The Nalu, also called Nalo, Nanum, or Nanu, are a West African ethnic group found in Guinea and Guinea Bissau. They speak the Nalu language. They have been described as "pre-Mandingas", as they settled in the region before the arrival of the Mandé peoples. In this context Walter Rodney places them alongside the Landuma, the Baga, and the Temne peoples.

The Simo is a West African secret society which is active among the Nalu and related groups.
