= Baga people =

West African ethnic group

Baga
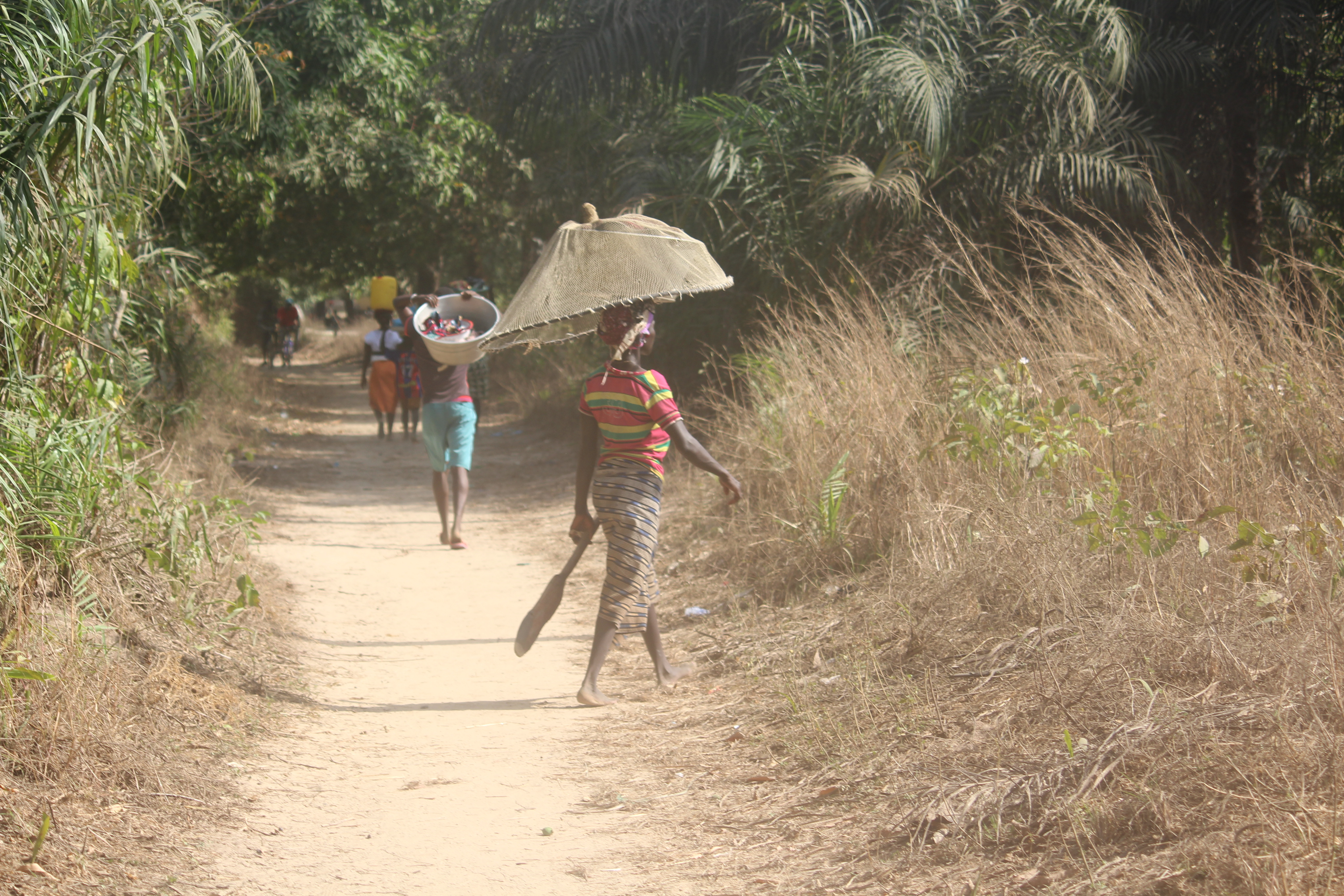
- Baga women around Kamsar (2020)

Total population
- 80,000

Regions with significant populations
- Guinea

Languages
- Baga, Susu

Religion
- Islam

Related ethnic groups
- Landouma people, Nalou people, Temne people

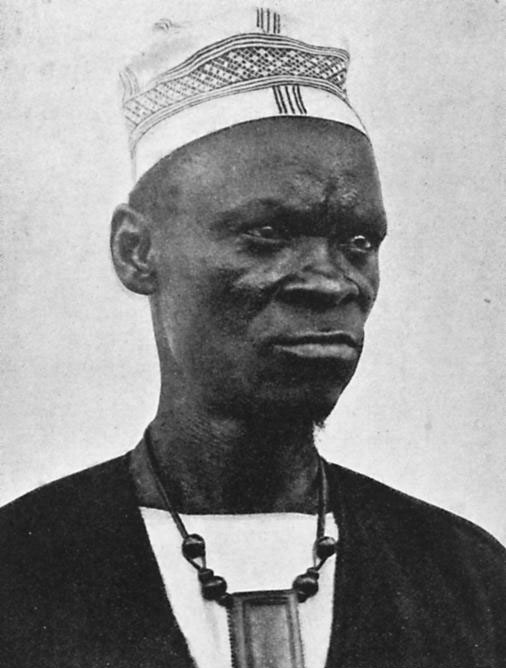
Baga Koba chief (1914)

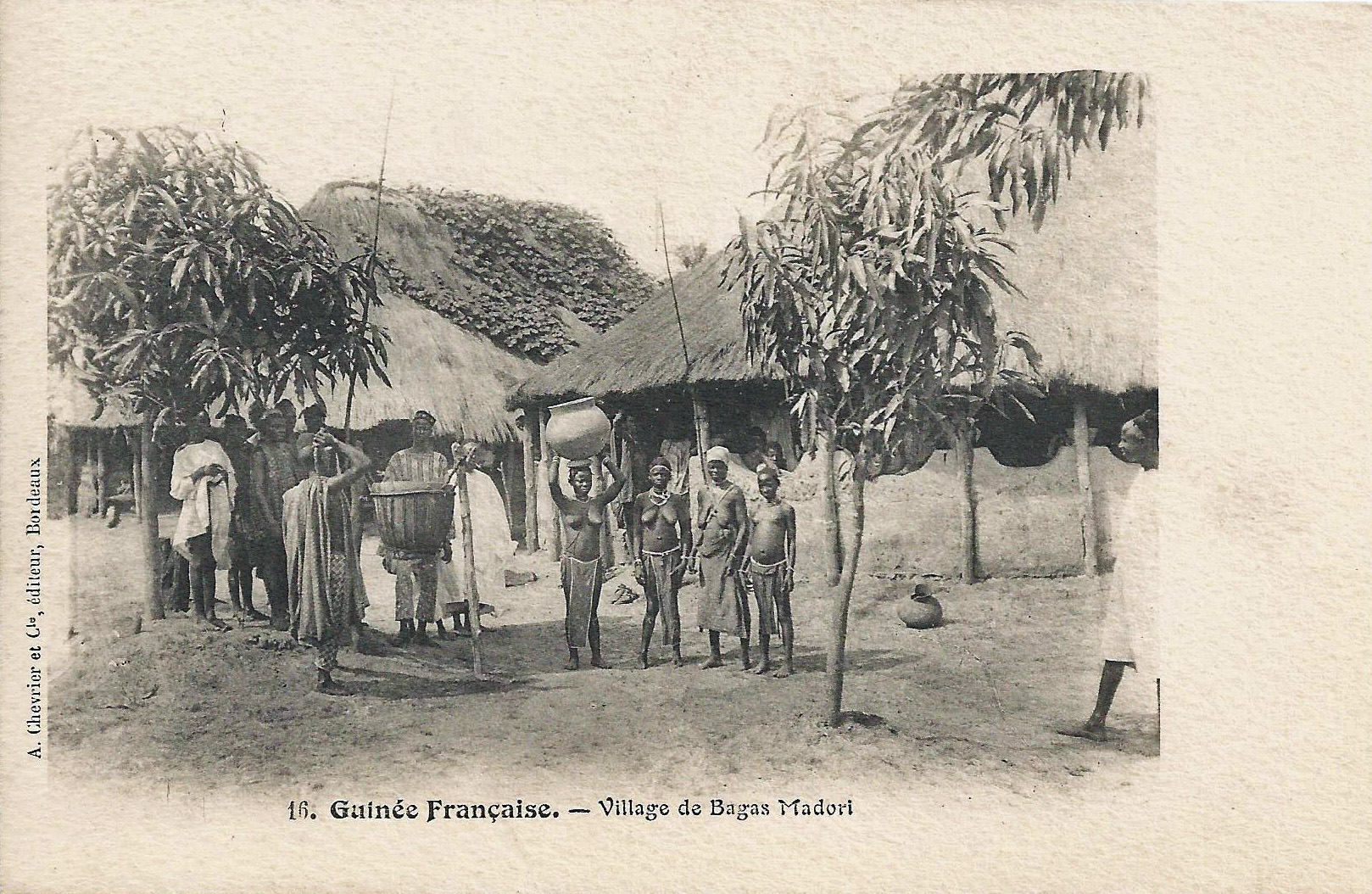
A Village of Baga People

The Baga are a West African ethnic group who live in the southern swampy lands of Guinea Atlantic coastline. Traditionally animist in pre-colonial times, they converted to Islam during the mid-eighteenth century under the influence of Muslim Mandé missionaries. Some continue to practice their traditional rituals.

Typically, rural and known for their agricultural successes, particularly with rice farming, the Baga people speak a language of the Atlantic branch of the Niger-Congo family.

They are also known for their historic animist pieces of artwork. Known for their beauty and sophistication, these have been displayed and held at many major museums of the world. After independence, a totalitarian Marxist government took over Guinea in 1958. Its program of "demystification" lasted till 1984, destroying the traditional beliefs and ritual arts of the Baga people.

== Ethnonymy ==
Depending on the sources and the context, we observe different forms: Aga, Baele, Baga-Binari, Baga-Koga, Bagas, Bagga, Bago, Bailo, Barka, Boloes, Kalum, Zape Boulones.

== Demographics and languages ==
The Baga people include a number of tribes that share cultural characteristics. The subgroups include the Mandori, Sitemu, Pukur, Bulunits, Kakissa (or Sobané), Koba, and the Kalum. They are also closely related to the inland Landuma, the Nalu of Guinea-Bissau, and the Temne of Sierra Leone, with whom they share linguistic similarities.

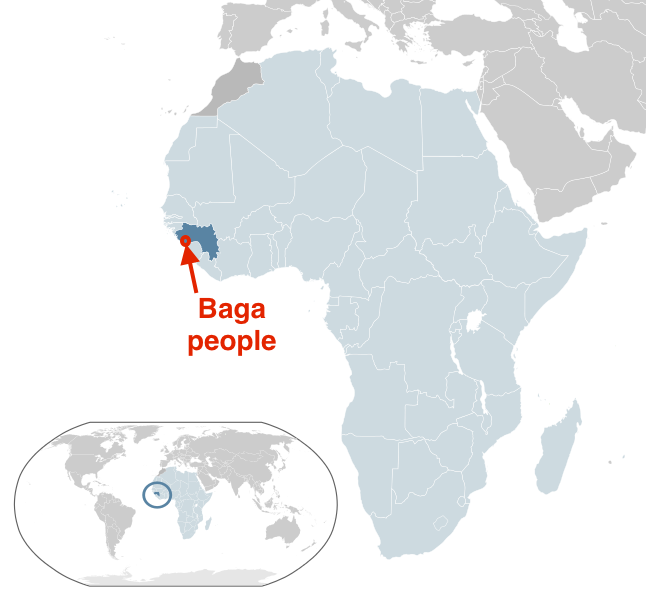
Baga people distribution in Guinea (approx).

The name Baga is derived from the Susu phrase bae raka, “people of the seaside.”

They speak the Baga languages. Many also speak the Mande language Susu because it has been the regional trade language. The Baga language has many dialects, and some of these have become extinct.

== History ==
Compared with other continents, Africa is characterized by multifarious and diverse ethnic groups, complex ethnic composition and strong changes in the formation process of modern ethnic groups. African cultures are characterized by the intersectional distribution of some ethnic language groups, their intermingling and the interaction between large and many small ethnic groups. (Clarke 2006) Without specialized ethnological and linguistic studies, it is often difficult to draw a line between some ethnic groups and determine which is the national group and which is only the constituent part. Today when talking about Baga people always refers to those who are “mangrove rice farmers and they live on the mangrove coast of today's Republic of Guinea”. (Ramon 1999) According to Baga oral tradition, the Baga originated in Guinea's interior highlands and were driven by aggressive neighbors westward to the coastal swamplands. They are considered "first-comers" along many areas of the Upper Guinea coast, and accrued landlord's rights in consequence of this. Here they constituted an acephalous society comprising a series of autonomous communities.

From the sixteenth century, the development of Portuguese trade routes extending from further north reached the region, which had simultaneously attracted trade routes from the hinterland. The Baga people, principally involved in the cultivation of rice and kola nut, and the production of salt, were a source of supplies to these traders. This new economic activity attracted new settlers to the area and led to the transformation of the society.

Portuguese settlers, primarily Lancados, integrated into the evolving multi-ethnic society by marrying the daughters of Baga chiefs (as took place in the American colonies as well). Some developed as political leaders among these peoples and established ruling dynasties of mixed-race descendants. For example, the Gomez and Fernandez dynasties gained political power, and the start of colonial-era influence.

In the eighteenth century, the Fula people created an Islamic theocracy from Fouta Djallon. They began slave raids against other peoples as a part of jihad, which adversely affected many West African ethnic groups including the Baga people. In particular, according to Ismail Rashid, the Fulani elites casting of the slave raids as part of religious jihad in the 1720s meant that they could justify enslavement of non-Islamic peoples. It also contributed to the conversion of previously animist peoples to Islam.

The high demand for slaves as labor for plantations in the Americas and Caribbean colonies made the slave trade economically lucrative. English and American traders operated along the Atlantic coasts of Guinea and had established ports for the slave trade. During this period the Susu people also migrated into the area where Baga people lived. They established dominance in land-based trade in cooperation with the Imamate of Futa Jallon. The Futa stationed a santigi in Bara to collect taxes and pay tribute to the imams.

In the late 19th century, Guinea was taken over politically as a colony by France, a change that affected all ethnic groups in the area, including the Baga people.

When Guinea became independent in 1958, the Marxist government implemented a policy of "forced demystification," confiscating and destroying all Baga traditional animist religious icons. After the 1984 overthrow of the former regime, the new government made Islam the state religion and outlawed non-Muslim religious practices. Only after the death of Sekou Toure in 1984 did Baga culture began to reemerge as an affirmation of tribal identity.

== Society and culture ==
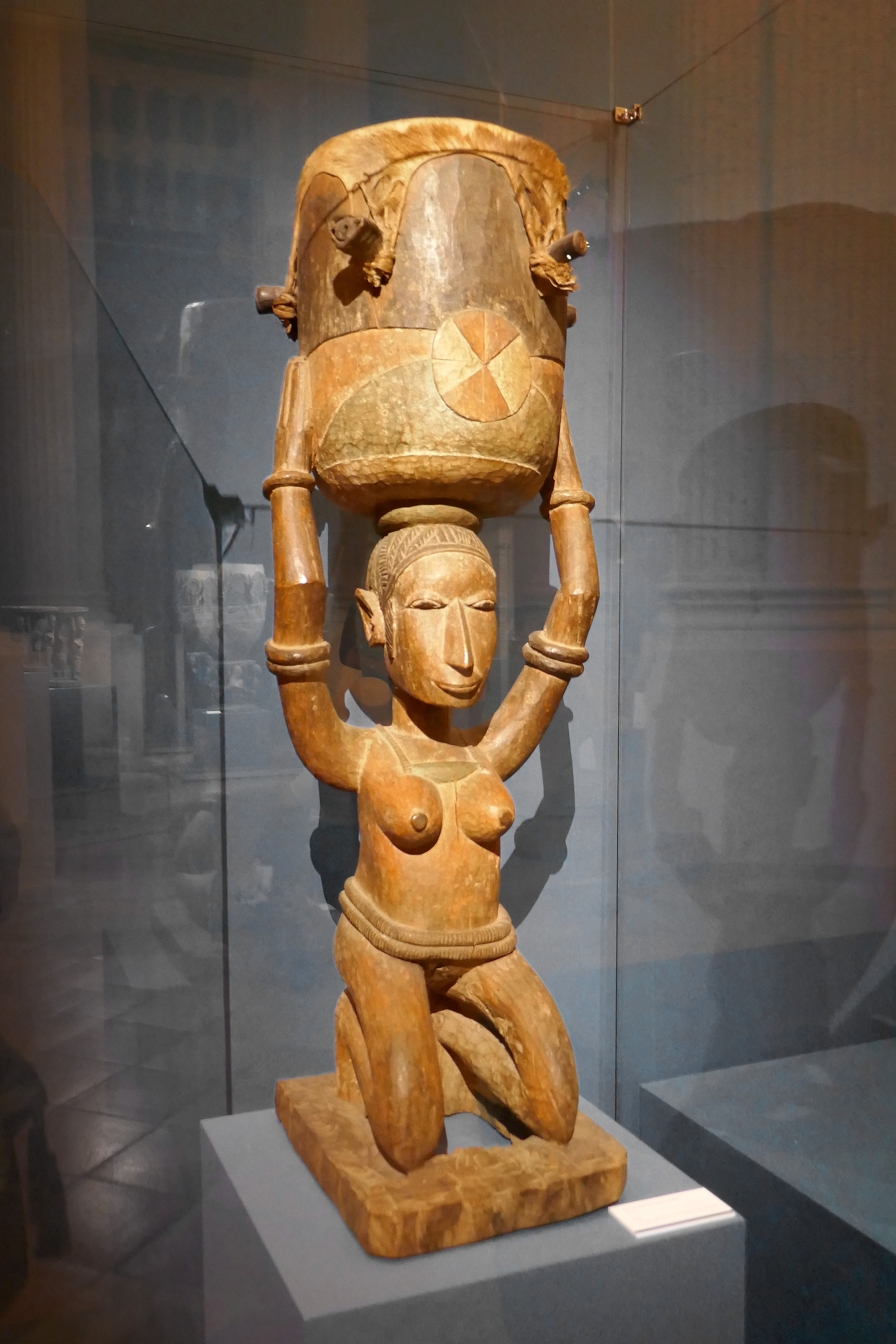
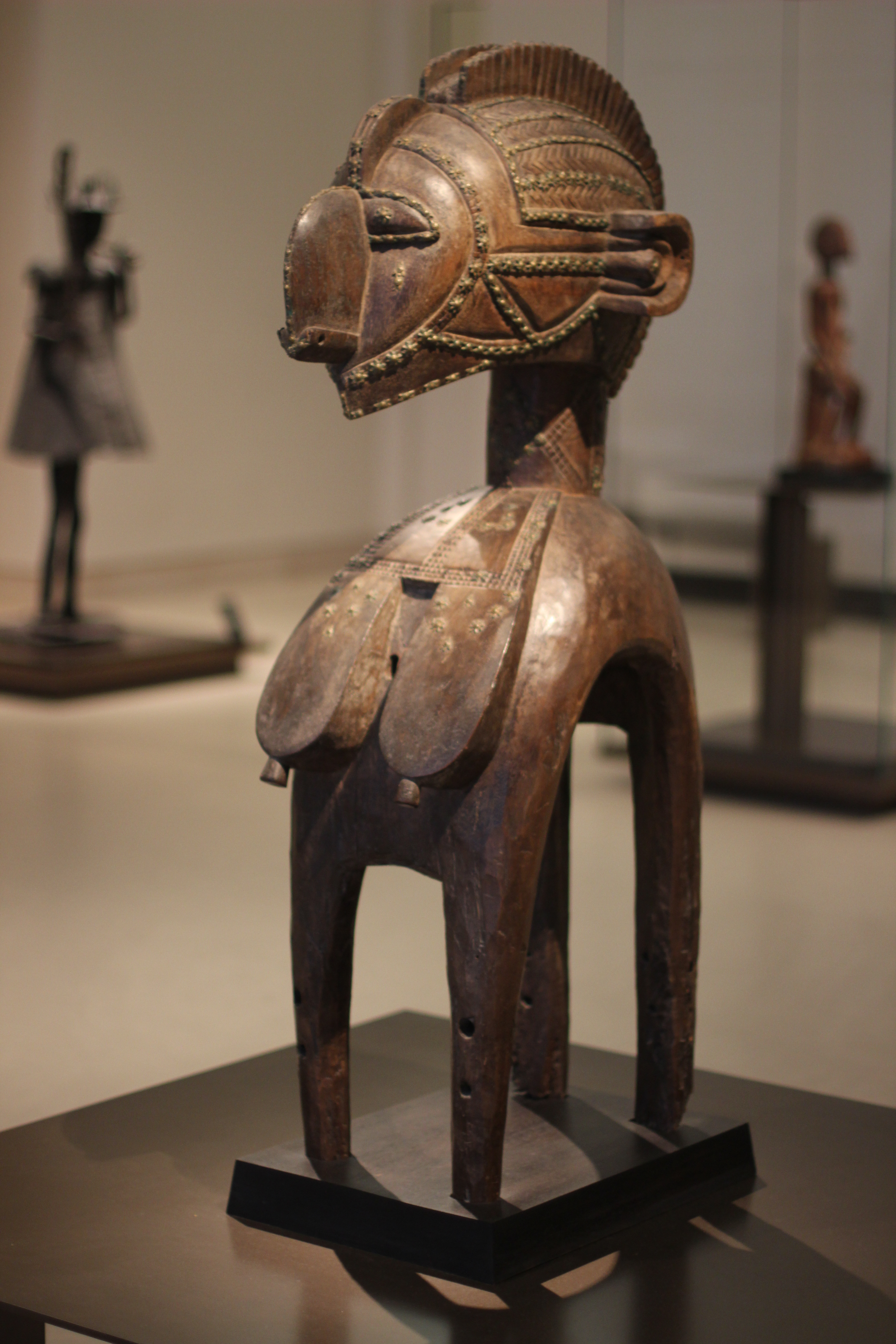
The animist-era artwork of the Baga people is highly valued and is held in many Western museums. Left: A carving of a woman at the Barbier-Mueller Geneva Museum; Right: A Baga sculpture at the Louvre Museum, Paris.

The Baga people, particularly the women, are known for their skills in rice farming in the swampy lowlands of southern Guinea coastline. The men are typically fishermen, who also tend palm and kola trees. The joint family is lineage-based. They have traditionally had a patrilineal kinship society, with authority held by the male elders of these kin groups. The elders constitute a village council.

Guinea's nationalization of land and property through socialist legislation following independence ended the effective power of the Baga elders. Most families live in clusters of cylindrical mud structures. These are roofed with thatched roofs made from rice straw, and these clusters are sometimes grouped to form small villages.

The Baga people historically had earlier refused to convert to Islam and retained their animist beliefs. But during the colonial slave trading period of West Africa, despite resisting religious and political pressure from the Fulani for centuries, almost all Baga people converted to Islam via the influence of Mandé missionaries in the 18th century. Now predominantly Muslim, they continue to practice animist rituals. For example, they ritually expose their dead for a period of time in a sacred grove, burn some of the possessions and the house of the dead person, before the Muslim style burial.

The Baga people are known for their rich history in arts, particularly with wood and metal. These include the mask called Nimba, an icon for the goddess of fertility and the largest known masks ever produced in Africa. They also carved Elek symbols as guardian symbols and for coding their Simo society secret lineage into it. Various utilitarian arts included similar encoding of spiritual themes. The Baga traditionally made another mask called Bansonyi, consisting of a painted pole (some were 20 feet long), which was colorfully decorated, ending in a calico flag and a triangular icon. The Bansonyi was used in male initiation ceremonies. After the systematic destruction over the 30-year period of totalitarian Marxist and then Islamic government rule, making such ritual art has become nearly extinct.

=== Baga chiefs ===
In Africa, when it comes to chiefs, their power and role was considered mysterious. Now, in many African countries, there are actually two sets of power institutions: one is the administrative organ of modern countries, which is managed by the president, the governor, the county head, the township head and other officials from the central government to the local government; the other is the traditional power system, which mainly exists in the vast rural areas of the chieftain territory, and implements the chieftain system, which is viewed as African characteristics. The chieftain system evolved from the original clan system at first. When Africa gradually transited from a slave society to a feudal society, the chieftain states and chieftain system, large and small, gradually formed. During the French colonial period, Bald Camara was chosen as the first "King" in the colonial region. But there is no evidence of why he was elected. Another very important chief was Katongoro. In 1909, the Toure built in Kondeyire the first mosque among the Baga Sitem and started to Islamise the population. But Katongoro gave some land to Christian missionaries to spread Christianity. And he himself was finally Christianized. From that we could see how a chief of Baga could change the culture of their clan. The chieftain system still exists in Africa today, but in the modern society with rapid economic development, it is quietly evolving in the direction of decline and disintegration, which is the conscious behavior and purpose of the government, as well as the inevitable result of social development. With the progress and development of the society, the chieftain and the government have established a new relationship of mutual cooperation, and the ancient chieftain system is undergoing remarkable changes.

=== Nimba masks ===
Also known as the D’mba, these mask have been collected by international museums and art collectors. Since the early 1980s, when the Marxist regime was replaced, some native communities are reviving their creation of such ritual pieces.

The first European documentation of these ceremonial pieces was in 1886; noting their being carved and performed in by males. The two key elements that have intrigued individuals who study the Nimba are the breast and linear designs along the face and head or hair.

The lower hanging breasts are to represent a woman at her zenith state, who has birthed and nursed healthy children, and hair that could resemble their neighbors from their native land, prior to displacement from the Futa Jallon mountains. The coiffure serves as a reminder to the Baga of their origins in the Futa Jallon. Often on each cheek, just below the eyes, there are two short carved lines—the mark of Baga ethnicity. Embellishments are sometimes added as well, including painted wooden ornaments attached to the ear or pendants attached to the nasal septum.

While the Baga were animist prior to conversion, the elders said that the D’mba does not represent a particular spirit or goddess, rather an idea. The D’mba is danced for harvest, planting, baby showers, weddings, and ritual ceremonies. It is to procure fertility and inspire Baga women to have strength during pregnancy, and to encourage males to stand by their women. For planting to inspire the society to continue through tough times that may arrive. In earlier uses the mask would be danced at least twice a year before the arrival of the rainy seasons.

The Nimba mask is carved from tree dark and is the largest mask known to be produced in Western Africa, being used by the Baga and their neighbors the Nalu, who live in Guinea and Guinea Bissau.

It is to be worn on the shoulders of a male dancer and secured with a rope that is tied onto the torso. The dancer is then concealed in a European cloth and a cover up called a raffia to completely cover the dancer. When worn by the masquerader the mask can be at least eight feet tall and can weigh eighty pounds or more. So that the performer might see, carvers strategically included the seeing holes into the torso underneath the breast.

With intricate scarification that resembles agricultural growth in West African fields the head of the D’mba resembles hair braided parallel common to the Fulbe people from the Futa Jallon mountains, and not the Baga. Paint and noise embellishments are added to the mask prior to ceremonies, if included.

The mask possesses all features of the human face, including a nose, neck, two eyes, two ears and a mouth. With a side view of the mask offering more sight of the detailing put into carving showing its height and length, the straight portrait view usually is very slender or slim allowing one to see the human resemblance better.

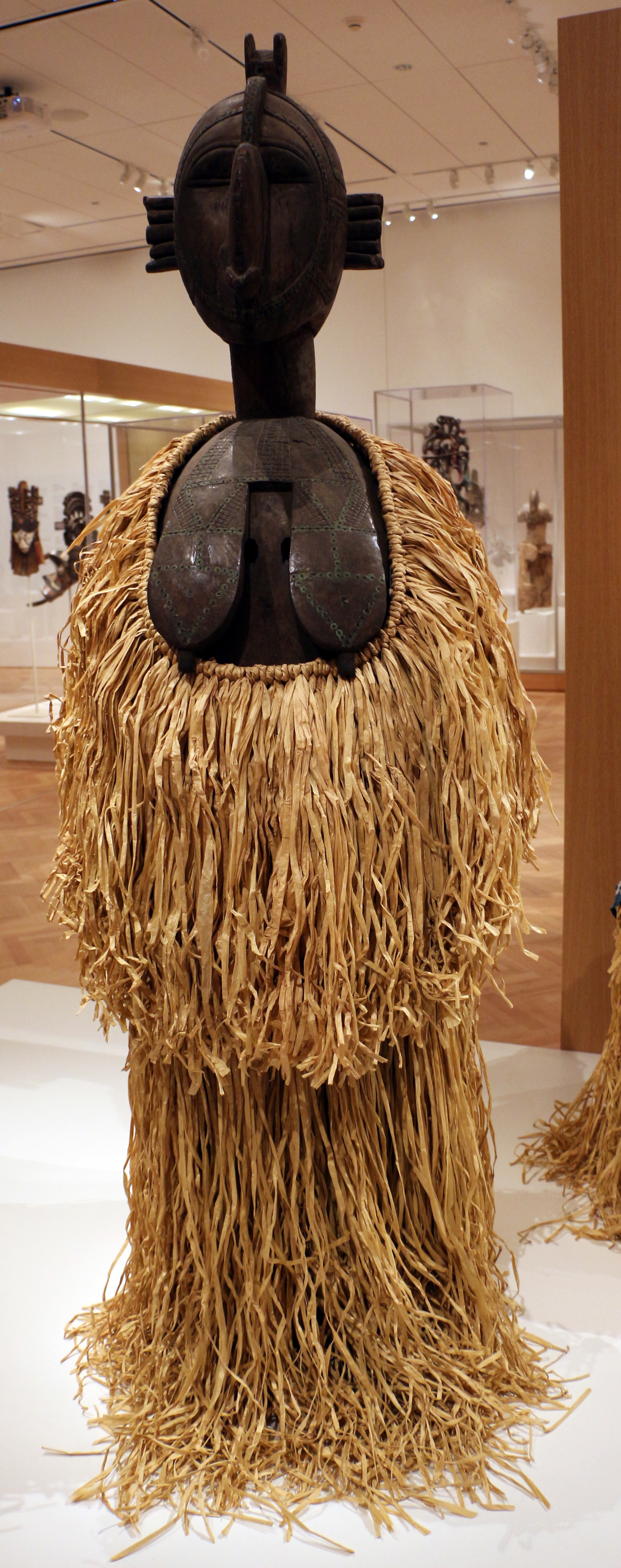
D'mba mask

Nimba mask are now sold and auctioned around the world, for thousands of dollars due to the delicacy needed when being transported. They are a part of numerous art museum's showings and permanent collections and personal collectors. In 2019 the Art Institute of Chicago opened a newly renovated African Art exhibit including a D’mba mask. Some critics say that after traveling to Africa artist Pablo Picasso drew inspiration from the D’mba mask in some of his sculptures. Much was to be learned about this art of the Baga people in the western world and after Frederick Lamps publication of Art of the Baga People 1996 progression was made.
