= Boké Prefecture =

Coordinates: 10°56′28″N 14°17′54″W

- Prefecture
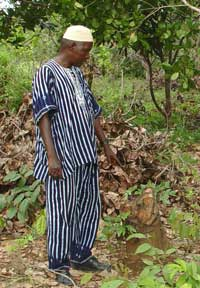
- A cashew plantation owner in the Boké prefecture

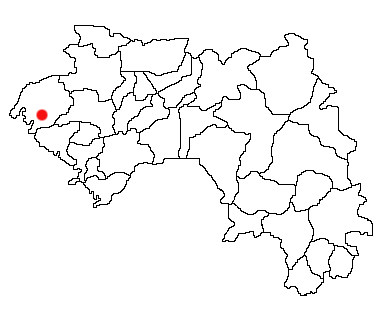
- Location of Boké Prefecture and seat in Guinea
- Country: Guinea
- Region: Boké Region
- Capital: Boké

Area
  - Total: 11,124 km^{2} (4,295 sq mi)

Population (2014 census)
  - Total: 449,405
  - Density: 40.400/km^{2} (104.63/sq mi)
- Time zone: UTC+0 (Guinea Standard Time)

Boké is a prefecture located in the Boké Region of Guinea. The capital is Boké. The prefecture covers an area of 11,124 km^{2} and has a population of 449,405. It contains several economically important areas of the country, including those engaged in fishing, mining, and agriculture.

== Sub-prefectures ==
The prefecture is divided administratively into 10 sub-prefectures:

1. Boké-Centre
2. Bintimodiya
3. Dabiss
4. Kamsar
5. Kanfarandé
6. Kolaboui
7. Malapouyah
8. Sangarédi
9. Sansalé
10. Tanéné
