= Boké Region =

Region of Guinea

Coordinates: 11°15′N 14°15′W

Boké
- Region
- Boké Region in Guinea
- Country: Guinea
- Regional capital: Boké

Area
  - Total: 31,186 km^{2} (12,041 sq mi)

Population (2025 census)
  - Total: 1,628,656
  - Density: 52.224/km^{2} (135.26/sq mi)
- HDI (2023): 0.474 low · 4th of 8

Boké Region (N'Ko: ߓߏ߬ߞߋ߫ ߕߌ߲߬ߞߎߘߎ߲) is located in western Guinea. It is bordered by the countries of Senegal and Guinea-Bissau and the Guinean regions of Kindia and Labé. The region's capital is the city of Boké.

== Administrative divisions ==
Boké Region is divided into five prefectures; which are further sub-divided into 37 sub-prefectures:

- Boffa Prefecture (8 sub-prefectures)
- Boké Prefecture (10 sub-prefectures)
- Fria Prefecture (4 sub-prefectures)
- Gaoual Prefecture (8 sub-prefectures)
- Koundara Prefecture (7 sub-prefectures)

== Mining reserves ==
Boké Region is the home to a great part of Guinea's aluminium (or bauxite) reserves. At least two of the country's largest mining facilities are located there:

- Compagnie des Bauxites de Guinée, or CBG, which is operated by Halco Mining, an international and intercorporate aluminium mining entity.
- Alumina Company of Guinea, or ACG, operating the Friguia bauxite-alumina complex in Fria Prefecture.

== See also ==
- Aluminium in Africa
- Regions of Guinea
