= Royal Museum of the Armed Forces and Military History =

Military museum in Brussels, Belgium

- Musée royal de l'Armée et d'Histoire militaire (French); Koninklijk Museum van het Leger en de Krijgsgeschiedenis (Dutch)
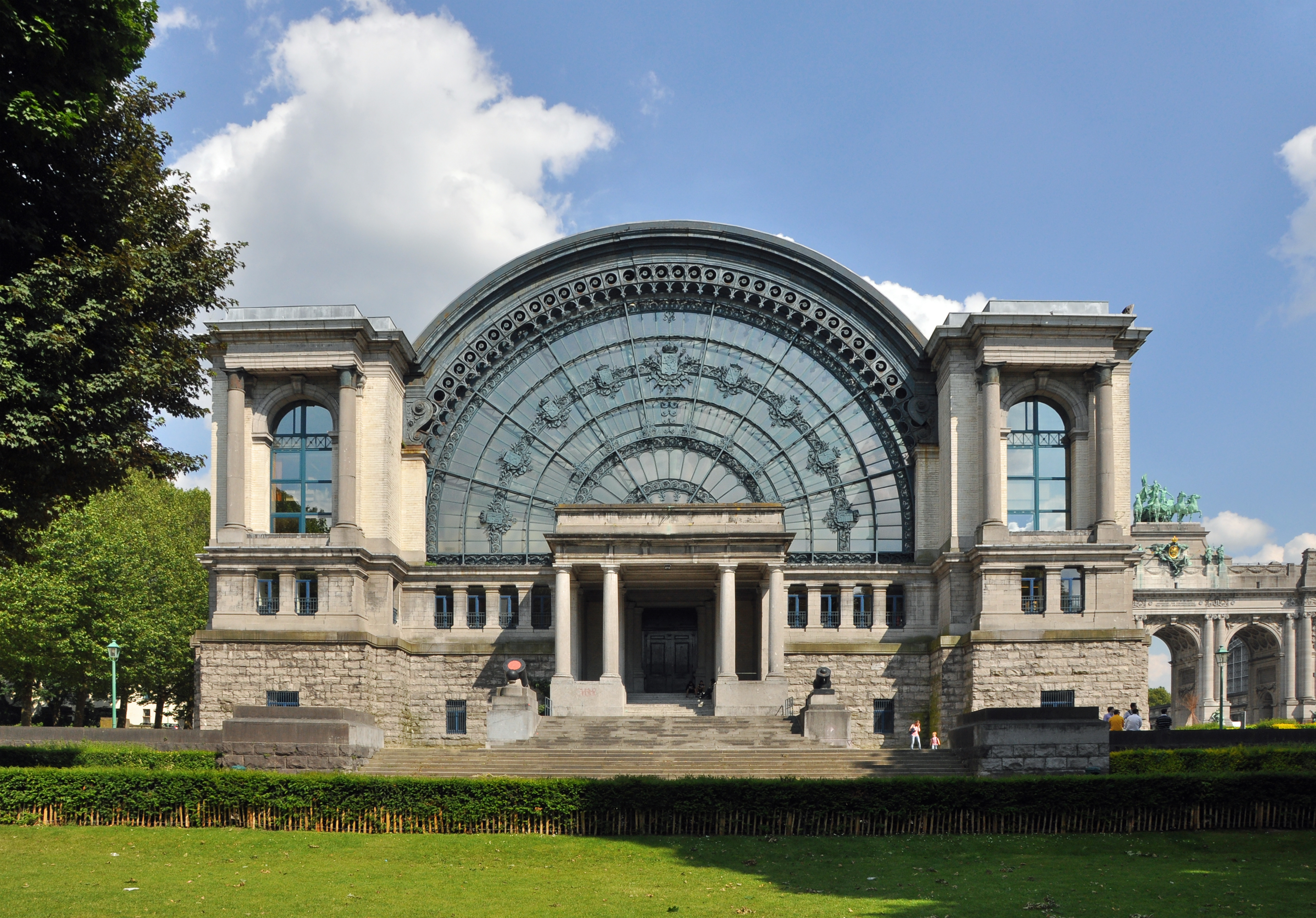
- Entrance to the Military Museum in the northern Bordiau Hall
- Interactive fullscreen map
- Former name: Royal Museum of the Armed Forces
- Established: 28 June 1923; 103 years ago
- Location: Parc du Cinquantenaire / Jubelpark 3, 1000 City of Brussels, Brussels-Capital Region, Belgium
- Coordinates: 50°50′26″N 4°23′34″E
- Type: Military museum
- Visitors: 97,029 (2022)
- Owner: War Heritage Institute
- Public transit access: Brussels-Schuman; 1 5 Schuman and Merode
- Parking: Museum grounds
- Website: www.klm-mra.be/en

The Royal Museum of the Armed Forces and Military History (French: Musée royal de l'Armée et d'Histoire militaire; Dutch: Koninklijk Museum van het Leger en de Krijgsgeschiedenis), also known as the Royal Military Museum (French: Musée royal de l'Armée (MRA); Dutch: Koninklijk Legermuseum (KLM)), is a military museum that occupies the two northernmost halls of the historic complex in the Parc du Cinquantenaire/Jubelpark in Brussels, Belgium.

== History ==
=== Origins (c. 1880–1910) ===
The Parc du Cinquantenaire/Jubelpark was part of a project commissioned by the Belgian Government under the patronage of King Leopold II for the 1880 National Exhibition, commemorating the 50th anniversary of the Belgian Revolution. In 1875, the architect Gédéon Bordiau made a proposal to build on this site, part of the so-called Linthout plains, the former military exercise ground of the Garde Civique outside of Brussels' city centre. The location was named Cinquantenaire in French (literally "Fiftieth Anniversary") and Jubelpark in Dutch ("Jubilee Park") because it was planned as an exhibition space to celebrate the anniversary.

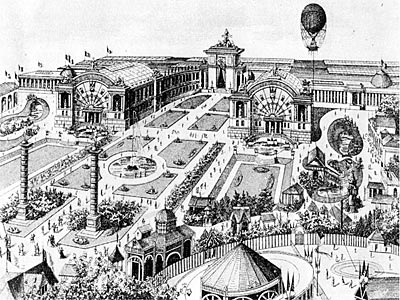
The inauguration of the Parc du Cinquantenaire/Jubelpark at the 1880 National Exhibition

Temporary structures were erected on the site for the International Exposition of 1897 as Bordiau's work had not been finished. The construction of buildings was put on hold in 1890 for lack of funds and was eventually stopped by the architect's death in 1904. Work resumed the following year under the direction of the French architect Charles Girault and was completed with a new patron, King Leopold II. The triumphal arch that had already been planned was amended and expanded to meet the king's wishes. Five years later, at the Brussels International Exposition of 1910, a section on military history was presented to the public on the same premises, and was met with great success. Given the population's enthusiasm, the authorities decided to create a military museum within the international context of extreme tension that led to the Great War.

=== Development of the museum ===
The museum was created by virtue of a royal decree issued on 28 November 1911, and was originally installed on the site of La Cambre Abbey, in the former premises of the Royal Military Academy. Its collections having been considerably enriched, the institution moved in 1923 to the Cinquantenaire Park, where it gradually moved into the various buildings in the northern part of the complex. The new Royal Museum of the Armed Forces (French: Musée Royal de l'Armée, Dutch: Koninklijk Museum van het Leger) was inaugurated by King Albert I on 22 July 1923. It is established in the curved galleries of the northern portion of the hemicycle, as well as in the metallic halls located to the west and south of the interior garden.

After the death of Albert I in 1934, the museum also took possession of part of the north pavilion of 1880, where the collection of casts of the future Royal Museums of Art and History (RMAH) had been established since 1886. On 9 April 1935, King Leopold III inaugurated a room there dedicated to his father and World War I. After 1945, the museum appropriated the entire pavilion; a section dedicated to Leopold III and World War II is set up there, inaugurated on 10 May 1955 by King Baudouin. Two years earlier, the institution had taken the official name of the Royal Museum of the Army and Military History (French: Musée Royal de l'Armée et d'Histoire Militaire or MRA, Dutch: Koninklijk Museum van het Leger en de Krijgsgeschiedenis or KLM).

A fire destroyed the south wing of the complex in 1946, part of the Royal Museums of Art and History (RMAH). The collection pieces were saved, and the burnt wing has since been rebuilt. As for the north wing, home to the Royal Museum of the Armed Forces and Military History, it was spared.

== Building ==
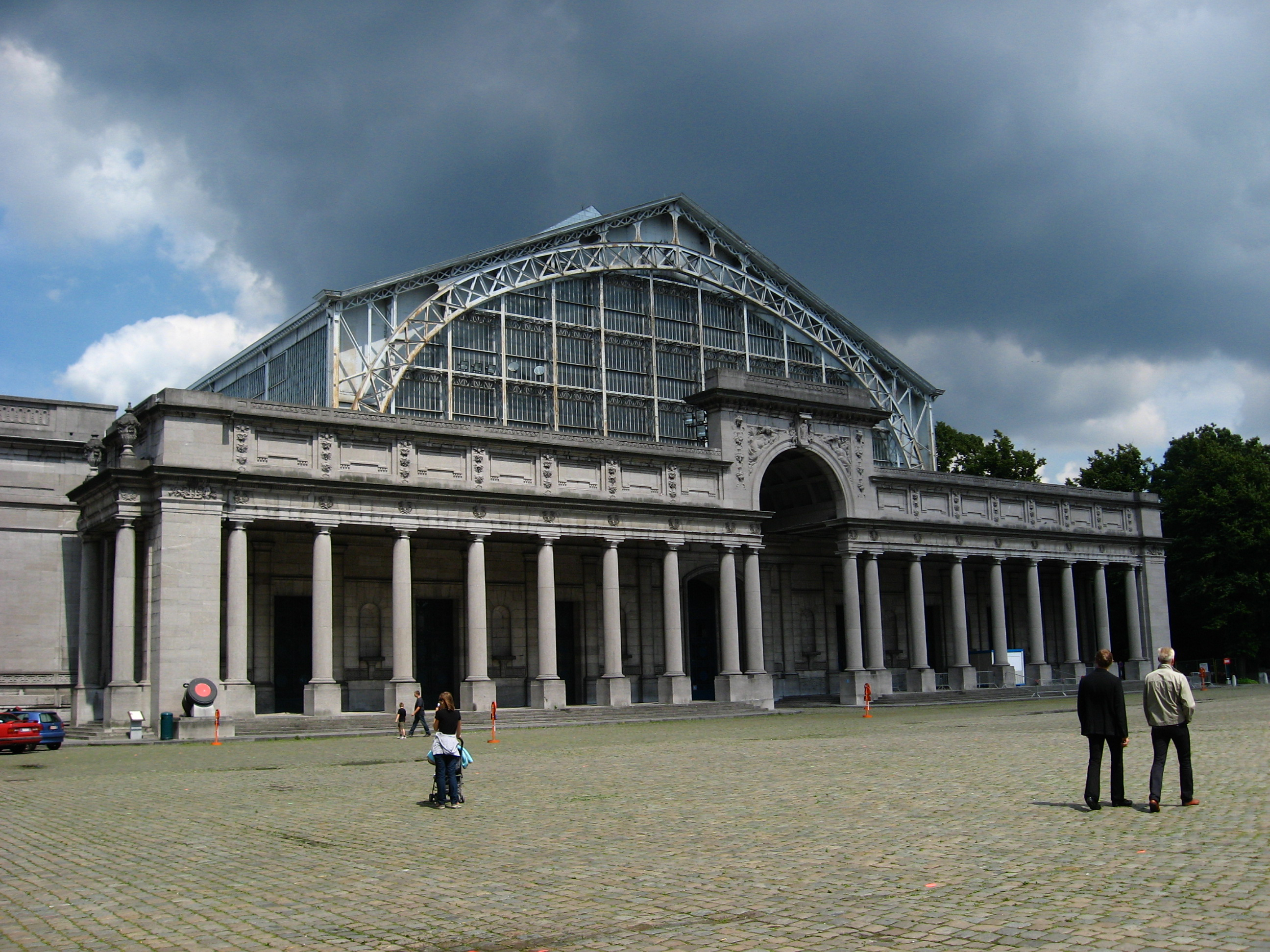
View of the North Hall, housing the Military Museum

The museum occupies the two northernmost halls of the Cinquantenaire: the northern Bordiau wing and the North Hall. Completed for the 1880 exhibition, like its southern counterpart, destroyed by fire in 1946 (and since rebuilt), the North Hall is the oldest building in the complex. Constructed in stone and metal, it combines classical rigor and industrial innovation in an original way.

The building has a rectangular plan, marked at each corner by a projection. Set in a masonry structure, its imposing iron frame forms a single-span structure composed of eight vast arches. These are supported on the side façades by cast iron buttresses with arcades on masonry buttresses. They are composed of two curved beams connected by means of metal parts forming a trellis, a motif that is found in other metal constructions of Bordiau. At the top of the roof is a saddleback skylight of which only the thin vertical walls are glazed.

== Collection ==
The museum's collection originally consisted of approximately 900 pieces collected by the officer Louis Leconte following World War I. Leconte collected considerable equipment abandoned by the Germans in 1918. The collection was later heavily enriched by legacies, gifts and exchanges.

Important developments in the 20th century included the opening of three new Departments of Technology, Scientific Documentation and Research in 1976, followed by the armoured vehicle section in 1980, the move of the armours collection from the Halle Gate to the northernmost hall in 1986, and the opening of the naval section in 1996.

Nowadays, the museum displays uniforms, weapons, vehicles and military equipment of all ages and all countries. Since 2004, the European Forum on Contemporary Conflicts has also had its headquarters in the museum.

=== Middle Ages ===
The medieval collection presents an overview of the period's offensive and defensive armament, and consists of an extensive display of weapons, shields, and banners, from the simple coat of mail to the full armour. Also included in the collection are a series of muskets and cannons, as well as a small battering ram.

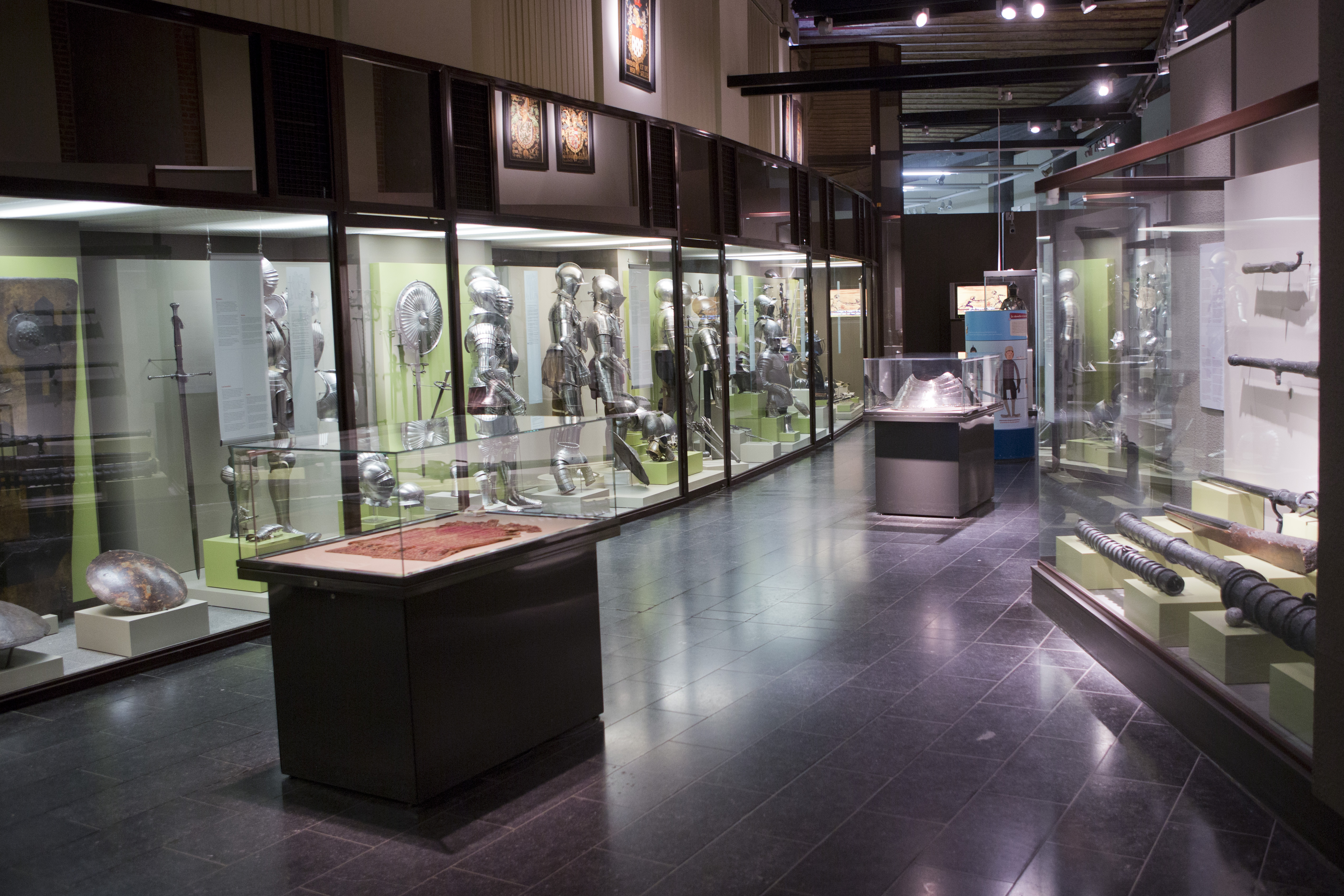
View of the medieval collection

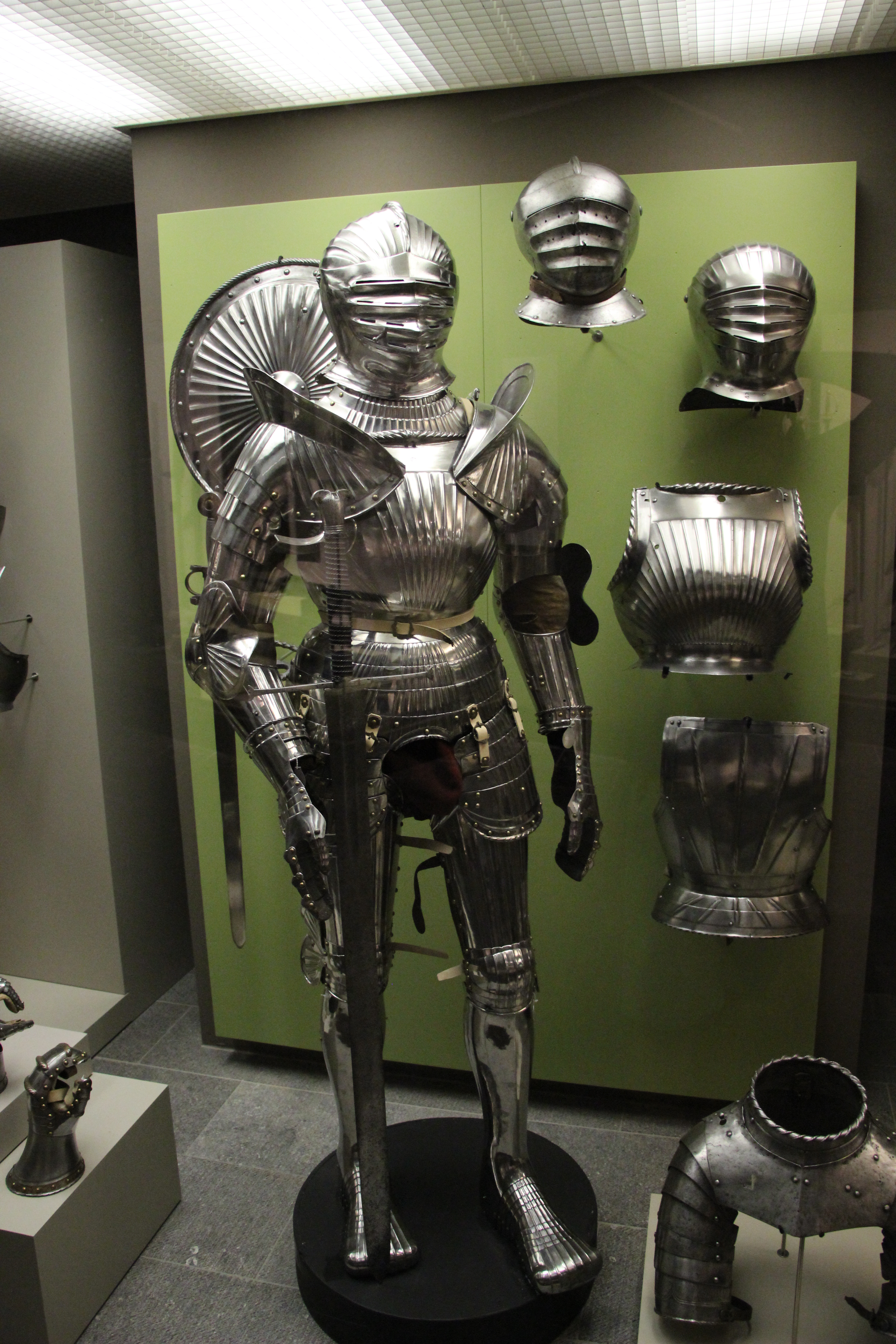
Historic armours

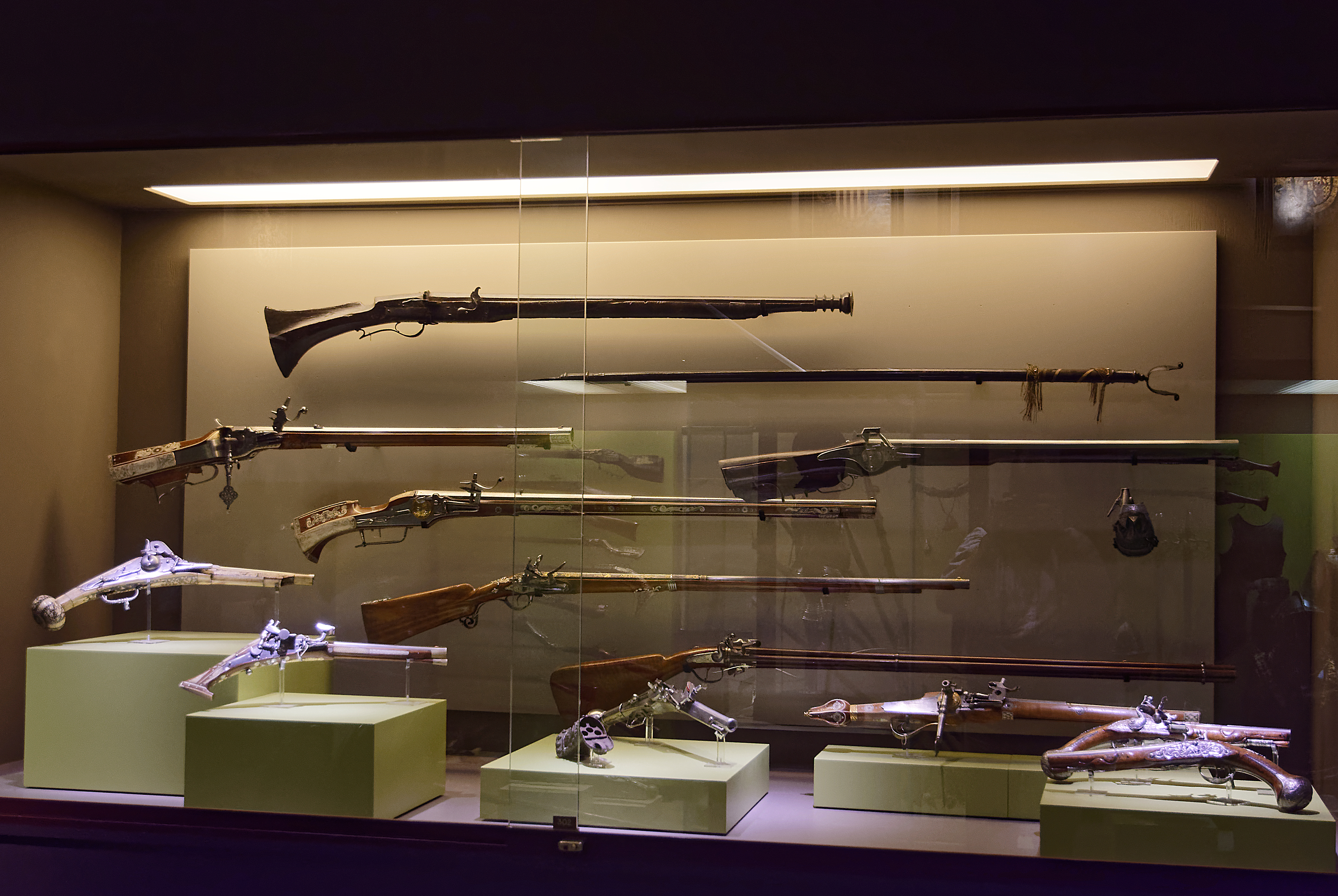
Muskets

=== 19th century ===
The main gallery is dedicated to Belgian military history from 1830 to the eve of World War I, along with paintings and busts of important military figures of the time. The technical gallery is where the evolution of firearms and manufacturing processes is shown. Several of the Belgian Army's weapons, especially portable ones, since its creation, are on display.

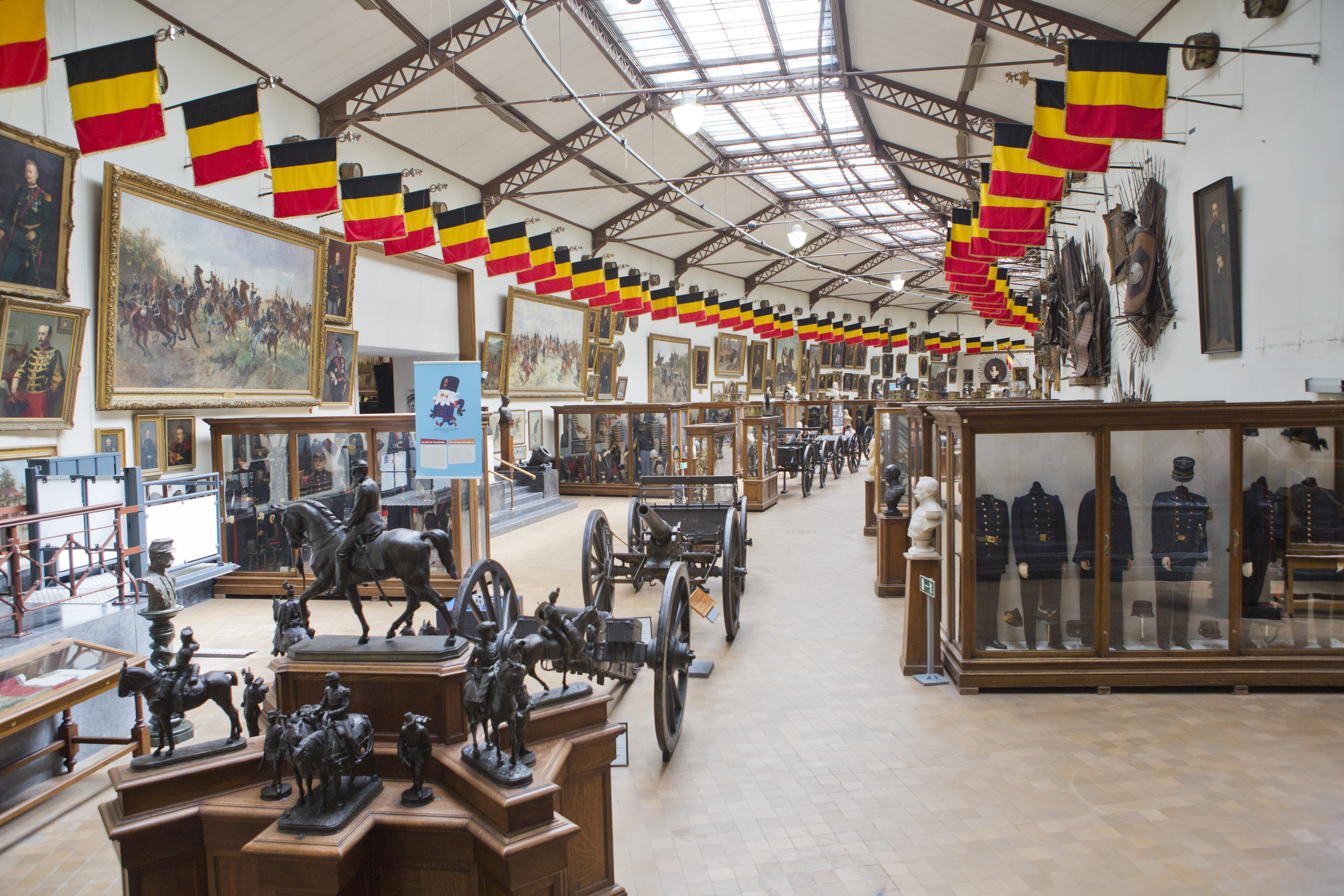
Main gallery, with the collection of Belgian 19th-century militaria

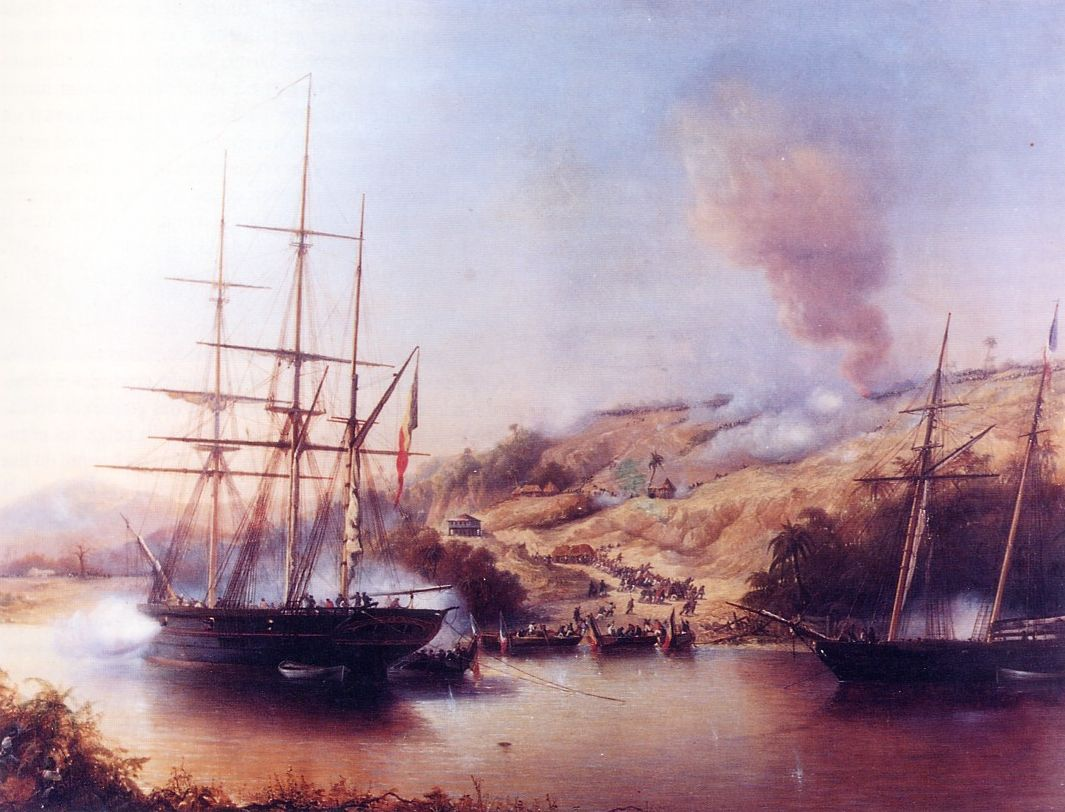
Belgian and French warships during the Rio Nuñez Incident, Paul Jean Clays, c. 1850

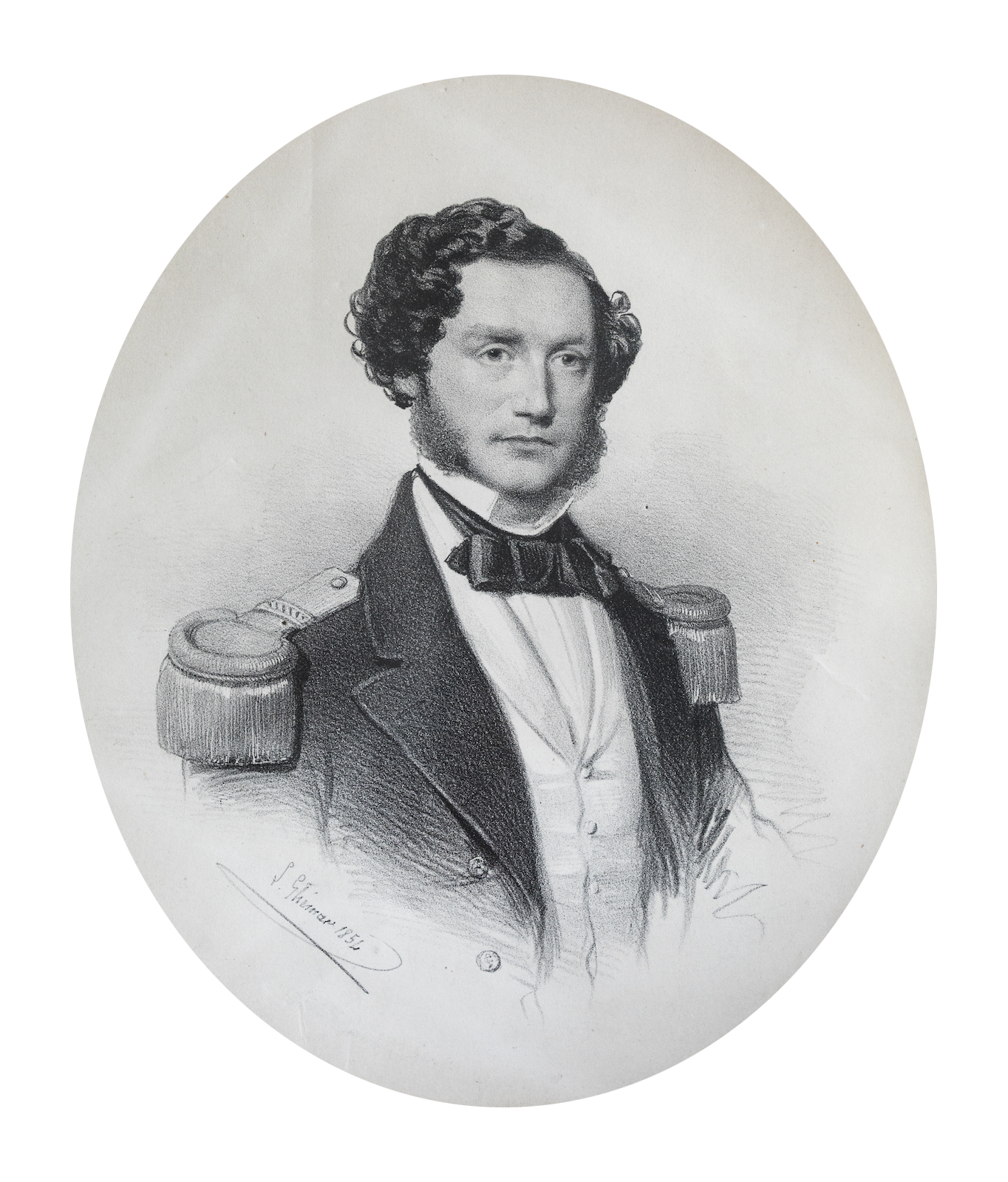
Portrait of Guillaume Delcourt, Louis Joseph Ghémar, 1854

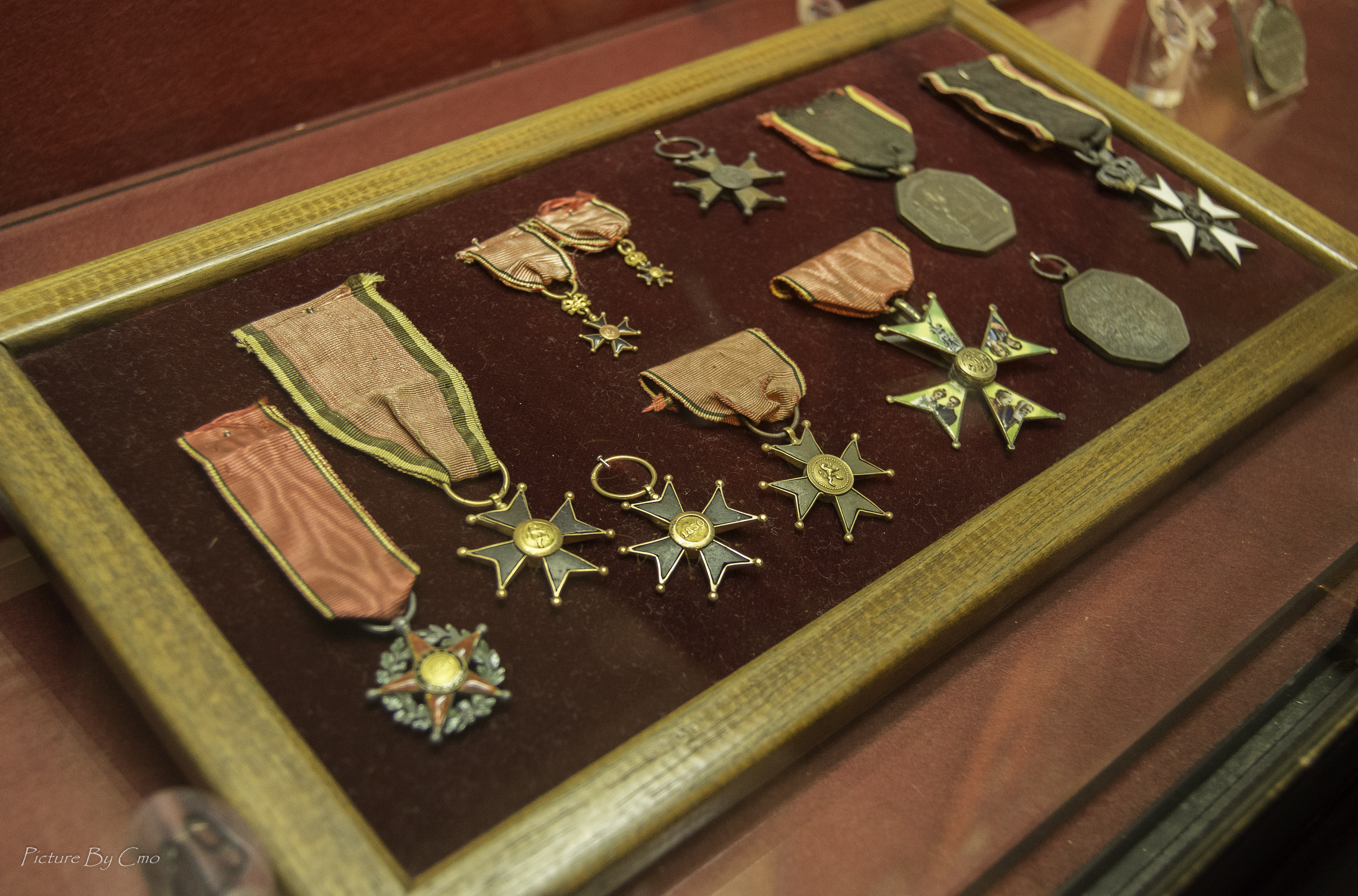
A part of the collection of historic medals

=== World War I ===
This section showcases a large concentration of uniforms, artillery pieces and vehicles. The planes of this war are exposed in the room dedicated to aviation. In this room is a Mark IV tank called Lodestar III and another Medium Mark A Whippet tank called Firefly. The latter was damaged in combat. Both vehicles have the original colours of the British Army during World War I and it is possible to see their interior. Alongside them is a Renault FT-17 from the same period.

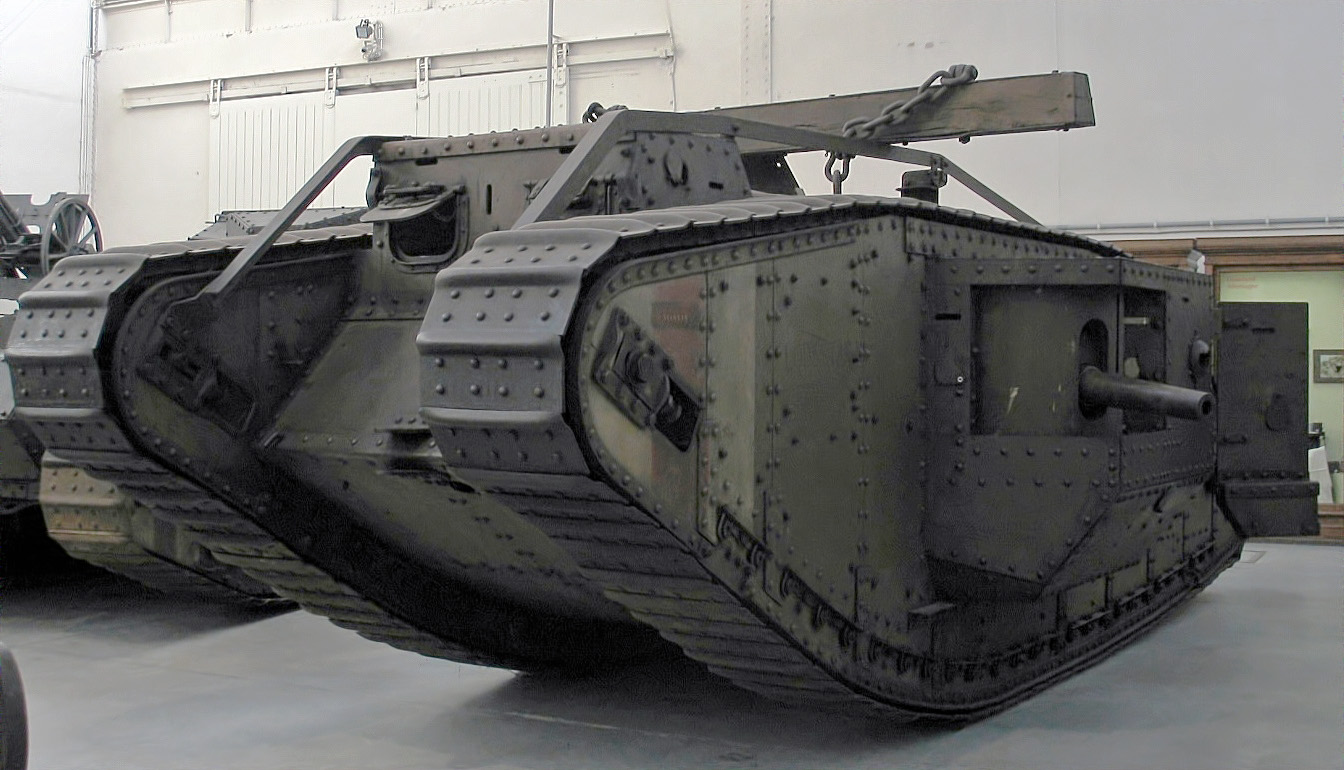
Lodestar III Mark IV tank

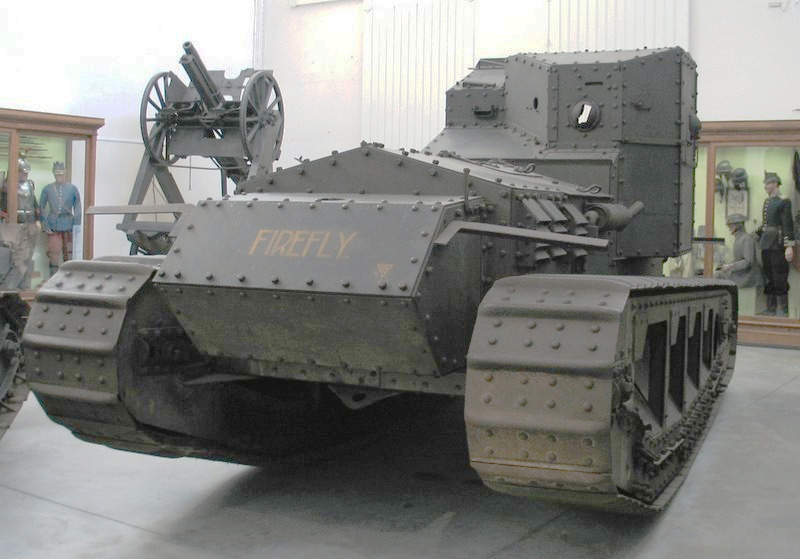
Firefly Medium Mark A Whippet tank

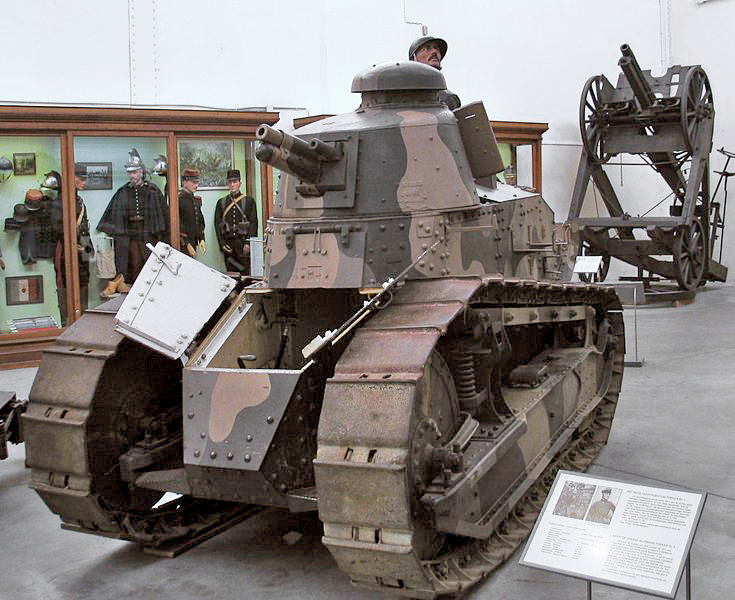
Renault FT-17 tank

=== Aviation ===
The north wing, built by Gédéon Bordiau, has been occupied by the Aviation Hall since 1972, when the Air and Space gallery was inaugurated. The collection includes various types of aircraft, both military and civilian, some dating back to the early 20th century. It includes surviving WWI aircraft like the Nieuport 17 and Sopwith Camel, whilst the most recent additions include an F-16 Fighting Falcon and Westland Sea King. The collection as a whole is one of the largest in the world.

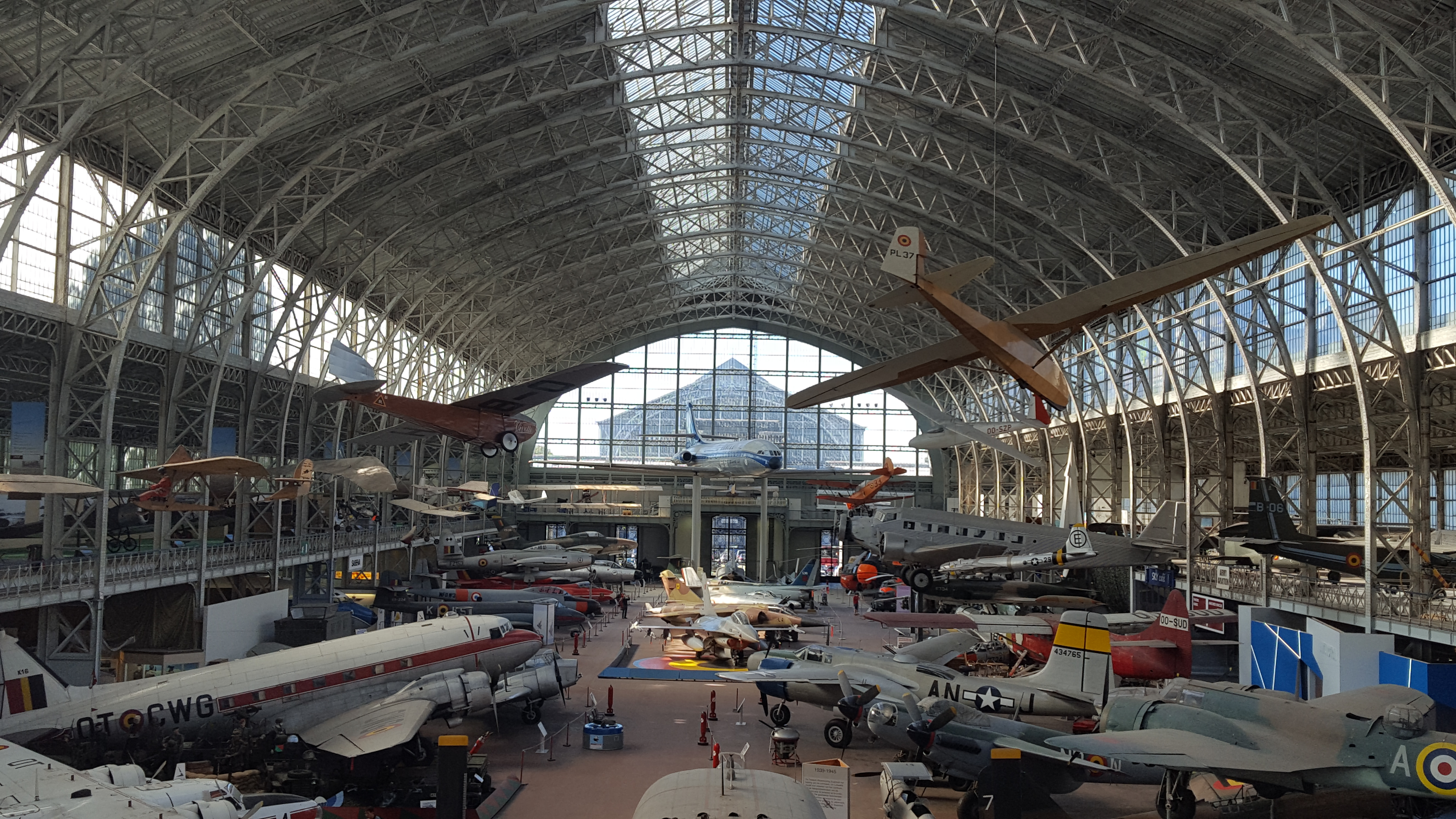
View of the aviation section in the North Hall

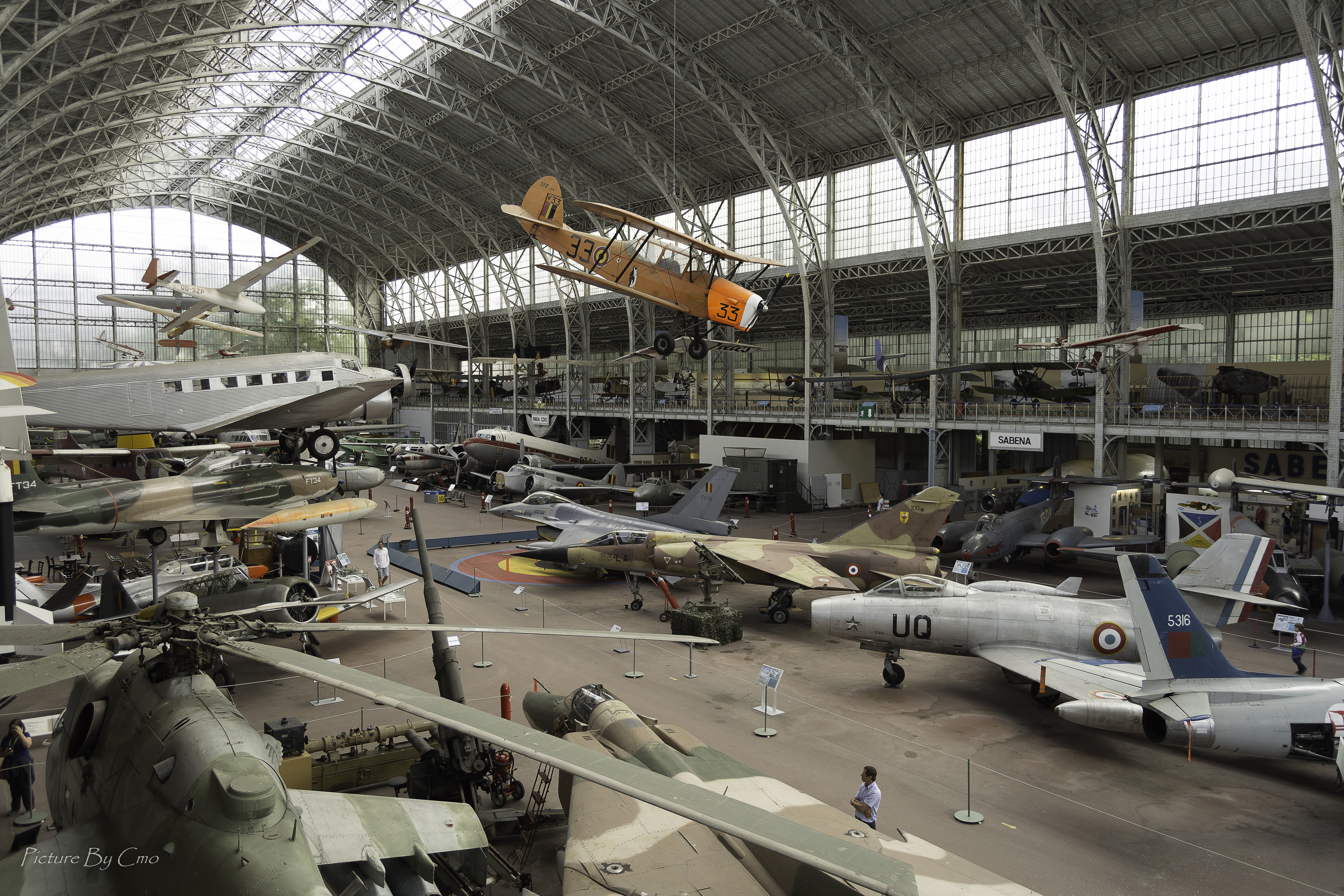
Aviation collection

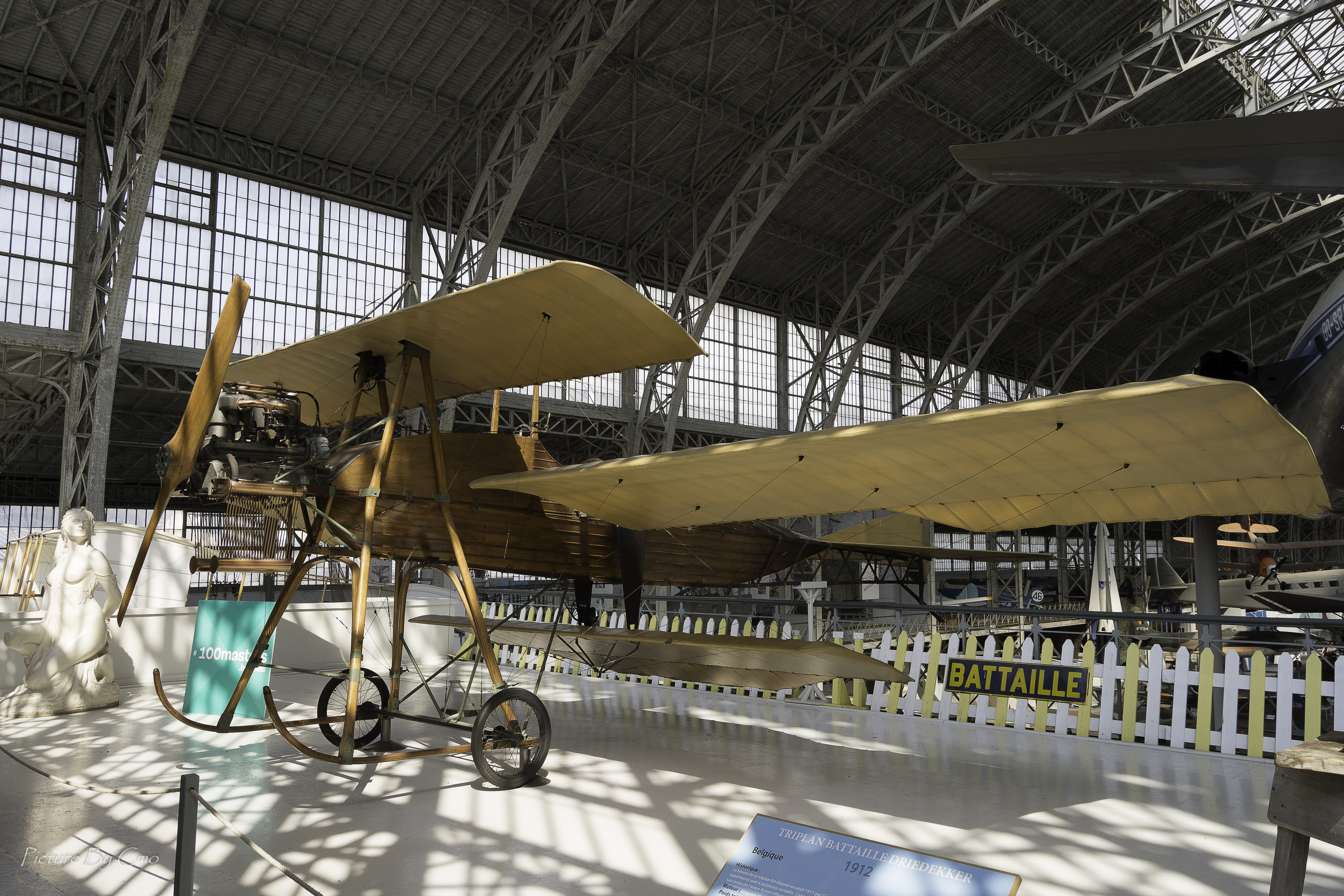
Battaille triplane (1911)

=== Navy ===
Dedicated to the Belgian Navy since its creation in 1831, this part of the museum has a section dedicated to the exploration of Antarctica. In one of the open-air courtyards, several ships of the Belgian Navy are exhibited, among them a P903 Meuse patrol boat, as well as the yacht used by King Baudouin and Queen Fabiola.

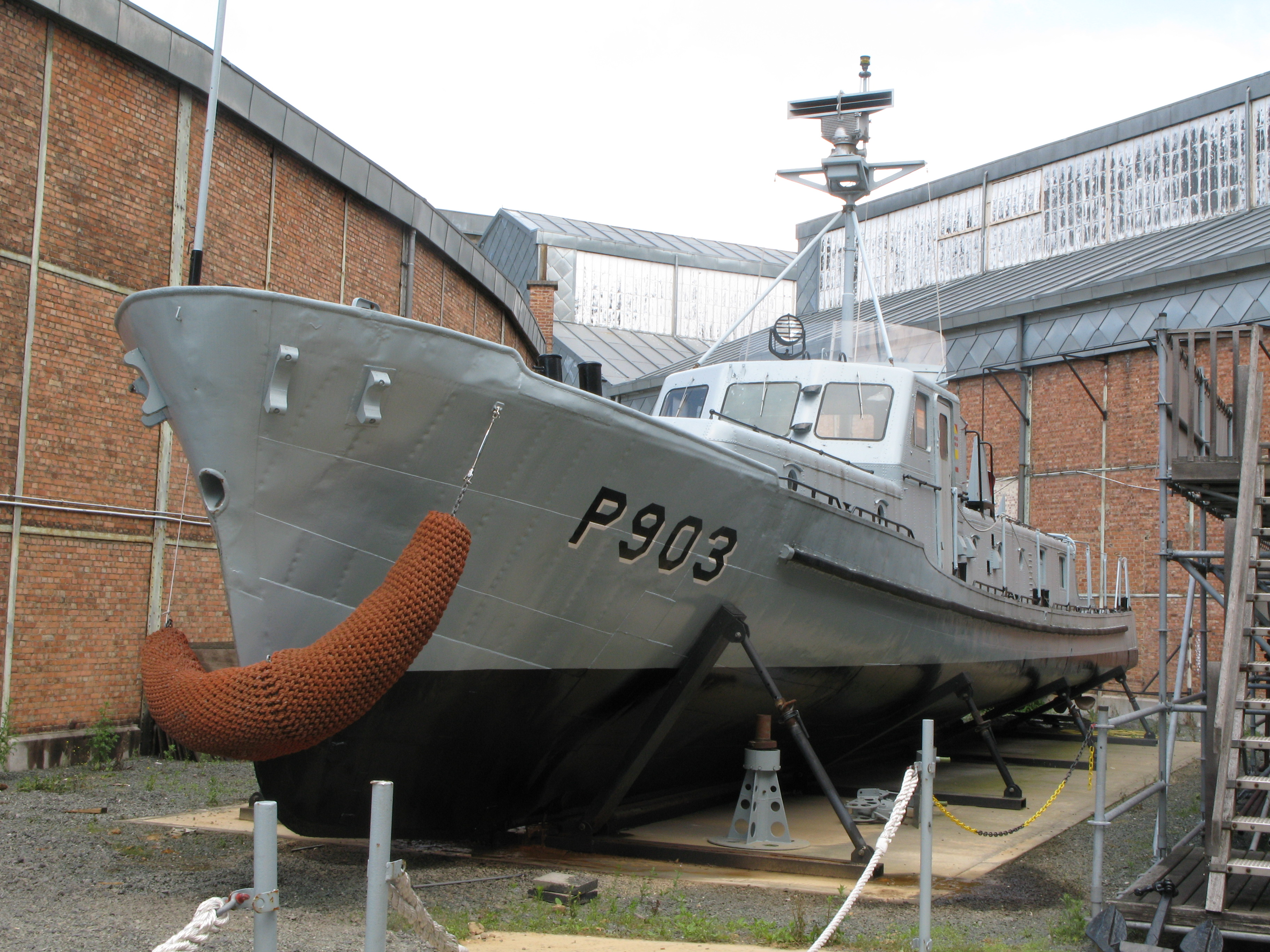
P903 Meuse patrol boat (1953)

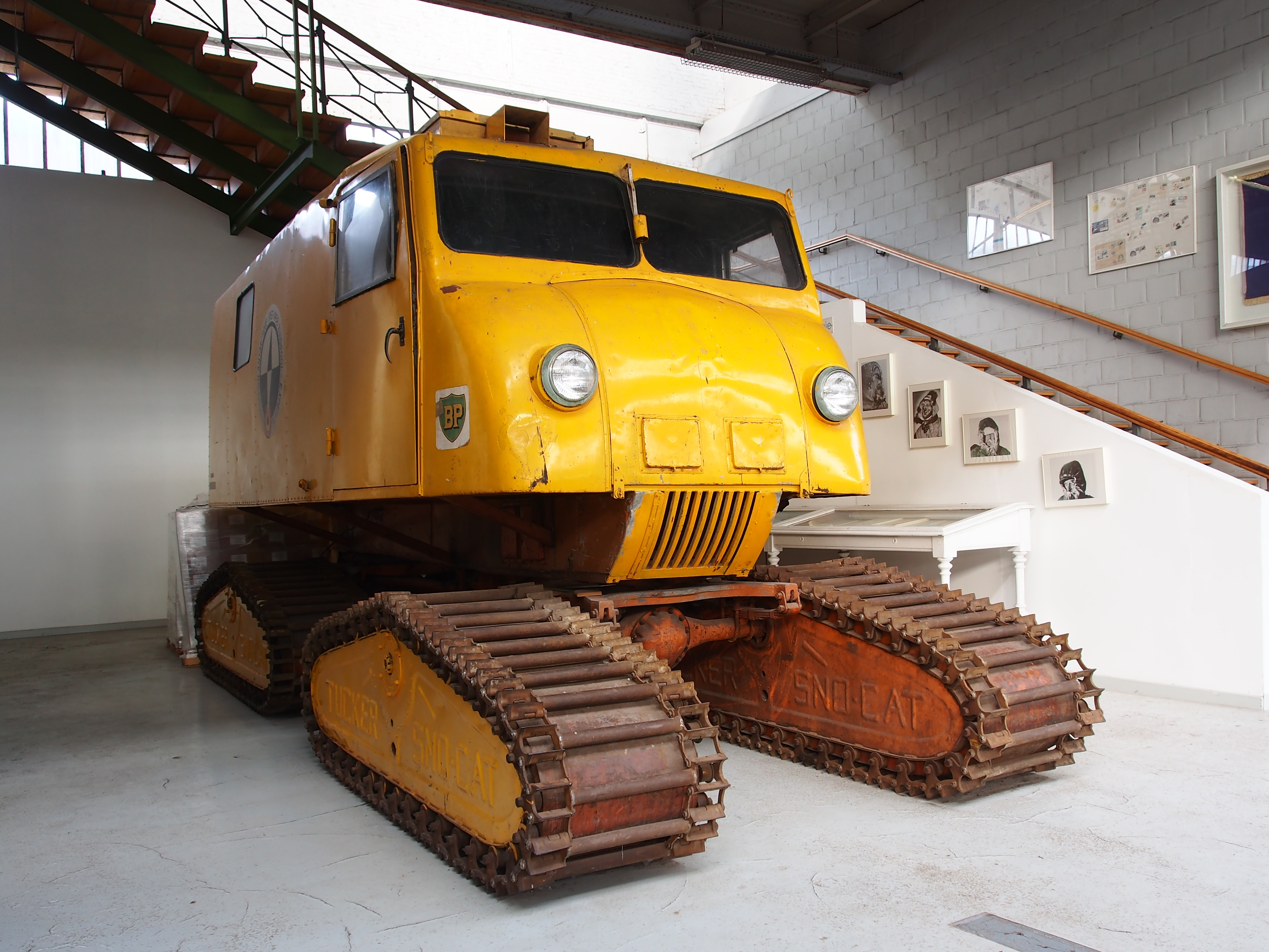
Tucker Sno-Cat, part of the Antarctica collection

=== Armoured vehicles ===
Several of the armoured vehicles that the museum holds are in rooms dedicated to WWI and WWII. Displayed in this courtyard are, among others, an M24 Chaffee, an M41 Walker Bulldog, as well as various Leopard 1 models. One of them is equipped for deep wading.

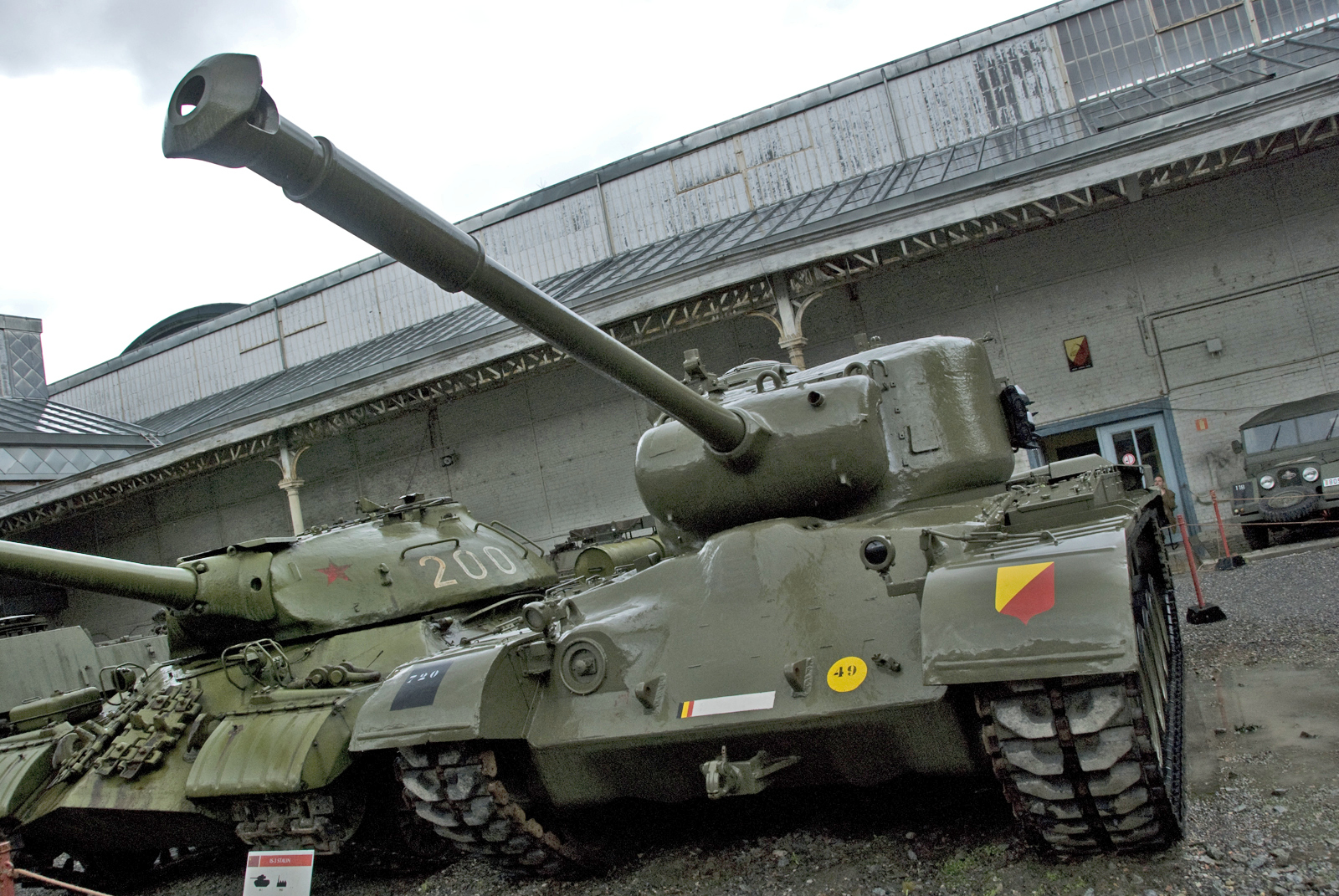
M46 Patton tank (1952) in the outdoor collection

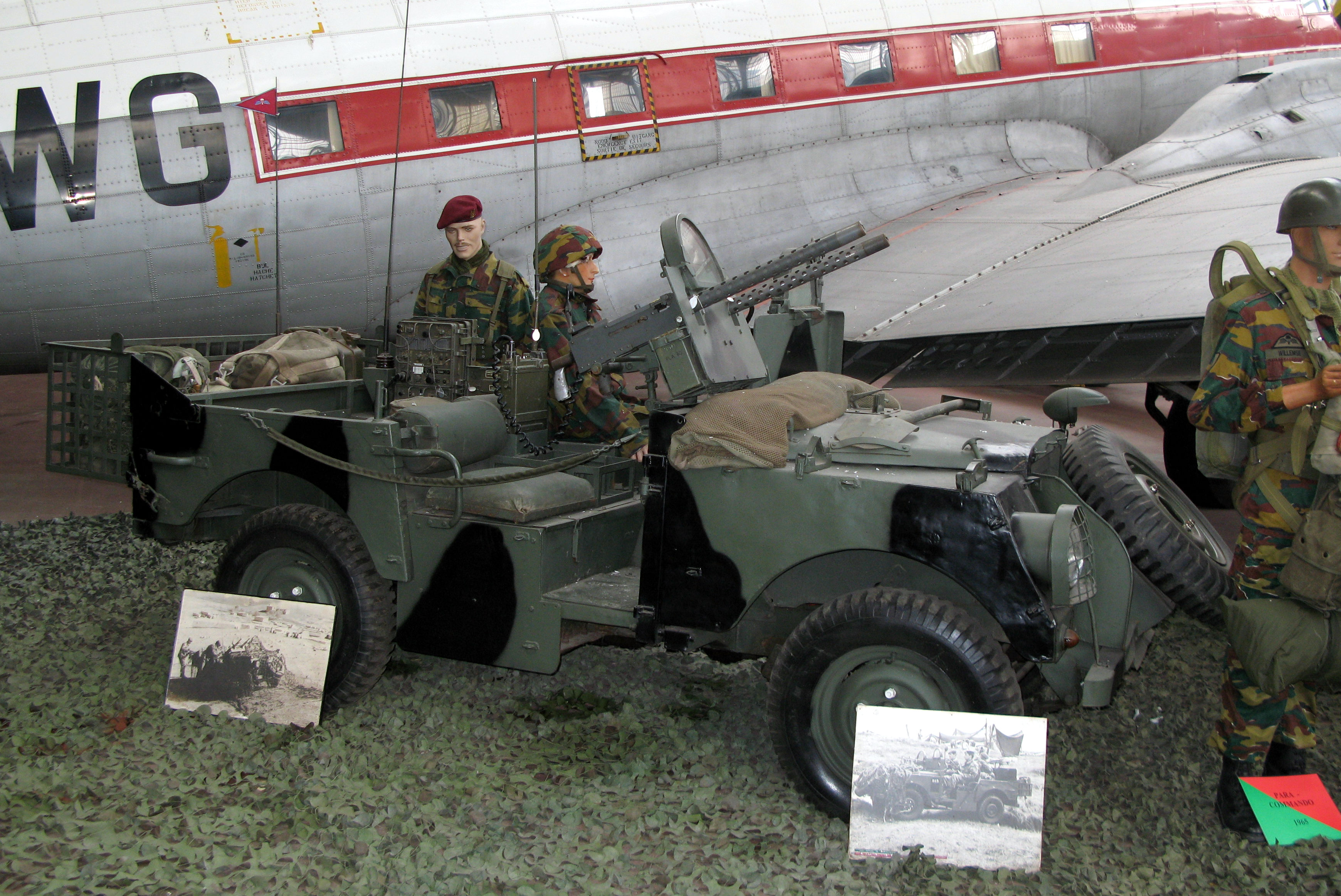
Belgian 1970s' Paracommando diorama

== See also ==
- Autoworld
- List of museums in Brussels
- History of Brussels
- Culture of Belgium
- Belgium in the long nineteenth century
