= Belgian colonial empire =

Former colonies of Belgium, 1908–1962

Belgian colonial empire Colonies belges (French) Belgische koloniën (Dutch)
- 1908–1962
- Flag Coat of arms
- Anthem: La Brabançonne
- Map of Belgium's colonies at their maximum extent in the interwar period.
- Capital: Brussels
- Common languages: French served as the main colonial language, but Dutch was also used to a lesser extent Local: various
- Religion: Roman Catholicism (Official)
- Government: Constitutional monarchy
- King
  - 1908–1909: Leopold II
  - 1909–1934: Albert I
  - 1934–1951: Leopold III
  - 1951–1962: Baudouin (last)
- History
  - Annexation of the Congo Free State: 1908
  - Annexation of Ruanda-Urundi: 1916
  - Independence of Congo: June 30 1960
  - Independence of Rwanda-Burundi: 1 July 1962

Area
  - Total: 2,430,270 km^{2} (938,330 sq mi)
- Currency: Belgian franc, Congolese franc and Ruanda-Urundi franc

The Kingdom of Belgium controlled several territories and concessions during the colonial era, principally the Belgian Congo (modern DR Congo) from 1908 to 1960, Ruanda-Urundi (modern Rwanda and Burundi) from 1922 to 1962, and the Lado Enclave (which was made up of a small portion of the modern Central Equatoria province in South Sudan) from 1894 to 1910. It was also a co-administrator of the Tangier International Zone in Morocco.

Roughly 98% of Belgium's overseas territory was just one colony (about 76 times larger than Belgium itself) – known as the Belgian Congo. The colony was founded in 1908 following the transfer of sovereignty from the Congo Free State, which was the personal property of Belgium's king, Leopold II. The violence used by Free State officials against indigenous Congolese and the ruthless system of economic extraction had led to intense diplomatic pressure on Belgium to take official control of the country. Belgian rule in the Congo was based on the "colonial trinity" (trinité coloniale) of state, missionary and private company interests. During the 1940s and 1950s, the Congo experienced extensive urbanization and the administration aimed to make it into a "model colony". As the result of a widespread and increasingly radical pro-independence movement, the Congo achieved independence, as the Republic of Congo-Léopoldville in 1960.

Of Belgium's other colonies, the most significant was Ruanda-Urundi, a portion of German East Africa, which was given to Belgium as a League of Nations Mandate, when Germany lost all of its colonies at the end of World War I. Following the Rwandan Revolution, the mandate became the independent states of Burundi and Rwanda in 1962.

== Background in the early 19th century ==
Belgium, a constitutional monarchy, gained its independence in 1830 from the United Kingdom of the Netherlands. By the time this was universally recognized in 1839, most European powers already had colonies and protectorates outside Europe and had begun to form spheres of influence.

In 1837, Belgium, under King Leopold I, sought to purchase Cuba from Spain as part of its early colonial ambitions. Minister Plenipotentiary in London proposed the acquisition to British Foreign Secretary Lord Palmerston, suggesting Belgium's serious intention, but the proposal never came to fruition due to diplomatic and political opposition.

During the 1840s and 50s, King Leopold I tentatively supported several proposals to acquire territories overseas. In 1843, he signed a contract with Ladd & Co. to colonize the Kingdom of Hawaii, but the deal fell apart when Ladd & Co. ran into financial difficulties. Belgian traders also extended their influence in West Africa but this too fell apart following the Rio Nuñez Incident of 1849 and growing Anglo-French rivalry in the region.

By the time Belgium's second king, Leopold II, was crowned, Belgian enthusiasm for colonialism had abated. Successive governments viewed colonial expansion as economically and politically risky and fundamentally unrewarding, and believed that informal empire, continuing Belgium's booming industrial trade in South America and Russia, was much more promising. As a result, Leopold pursued his colonial ambitions without the support of the Belgian government. The archives of the Belgian Ministry of Foreign Affairs and Trade show that Leopold investigated possible colonies in dozens of territories.

== The Congo ==
=== Congo Free State (1885–1908) ===
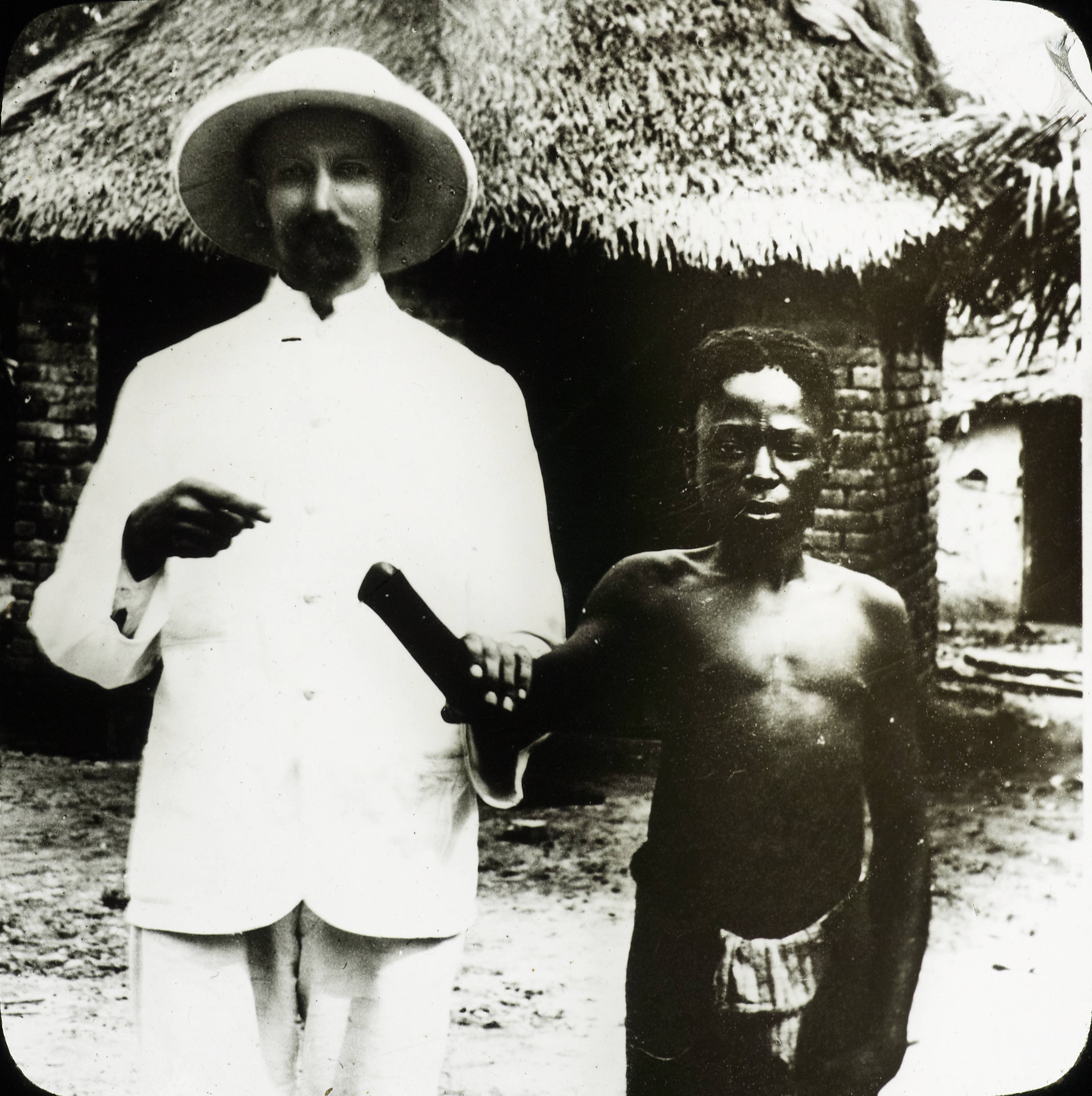
A missionary posing with a victim of the Congo atrocities

Colonization of the Congo began in the late 19th century. King Leopold II, frustrated by his nation's lack of international power and prestige, tried to persuade the Belgian government to support colonial expansion around the then-largely unexplored Congo Basin. Their refusal led Leopold to create a state under his own personal rule. With support from a number of Western countries who saw Leopold as a useful buffer between rival colonial powers, Leopold achieved international recognition for the Congo Free State in 1885.

The Free State government exploited the Congo for its natural resources, first ivory and later rubber which was becoming a valuable commodity. With the support of the Free State's military, the Force Publique, the territory was divided into private concessions. The Abir Congo Company (ABIR), among others, used force and brutality to extract profit from the territory. Their regime in the Congo used forced labour, and murder and mutilation on indigenous Congolese who did not fulfill quotas for rubber collections. Millions of Congolese died during this time. Many deaths can be attributed to new diseases introduced by contact with European colonists, including smallpox which killed nearly half the population in the areas surrounding the lower Congo River.

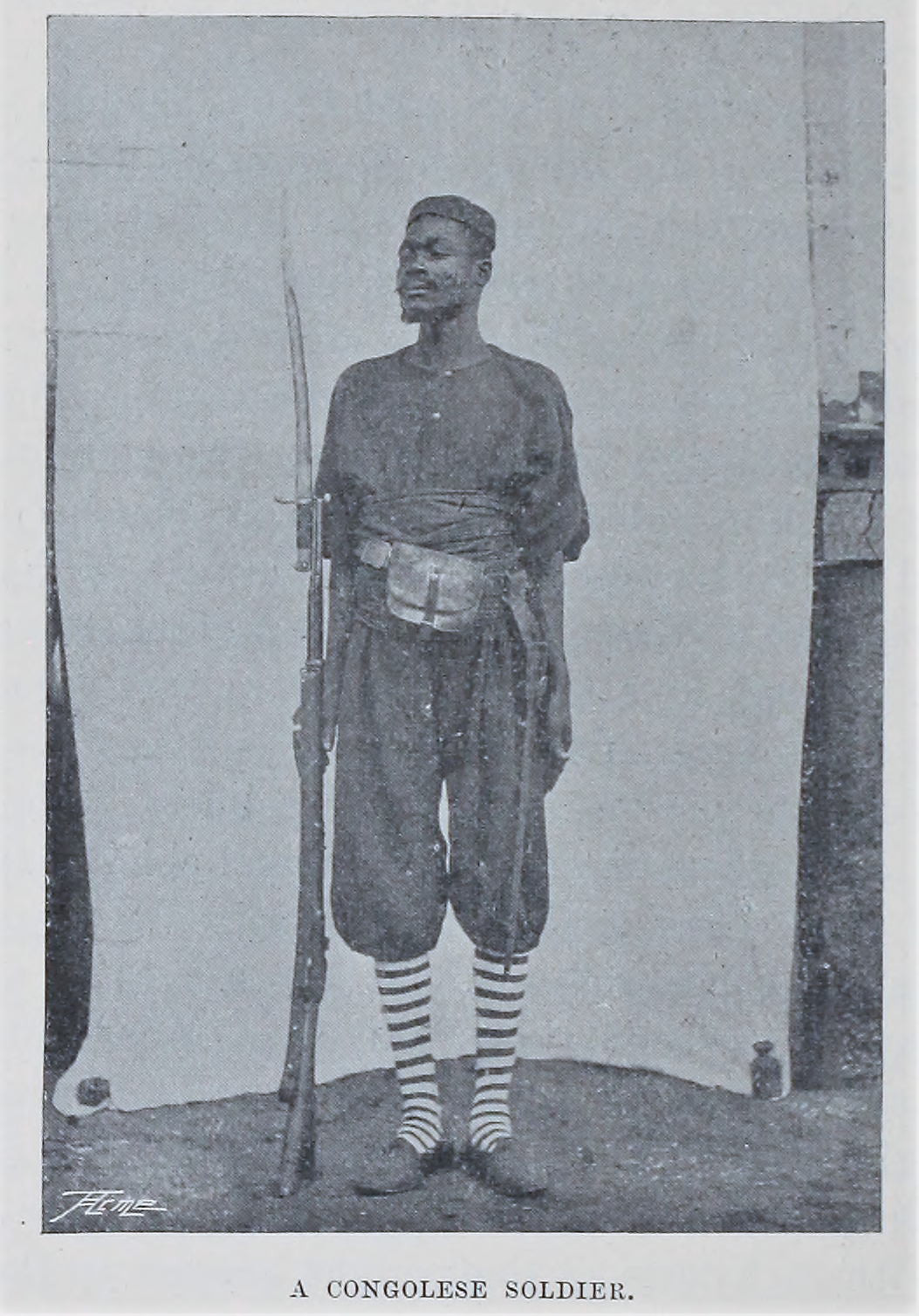
A Force Publique soldier in 1898

A sharp reduction of the population of the Congo through excess deaths occurred in the Free State period but estimates of the deaths toll vary considerably. Although the figures are estimates, it is believed that as many as ten million Congolese died during the period, roughly a fifth of the population. As the first census did not take place until 1924, it is difficult to quantify the population loss of the period and these figures have been disputed by some who, like William Rubinstein, claim that the figures cited by Adam Hochschild are speculative estimates based on little evidence.

Although the Congo Free State was not a Belgian colony, Belgium was its chief beneficiary in terms of trade and the employment of its citizens. Rubber profits brought Leopold immense personal wealth, which he used to construct several buildings in Brussels and Ostend intended to glorify himself and his country.

=== Lado Enclave (1894–1910) ===
The Lado Enclave was a colony of the Free State itself, and existed from 1894 and alter Belgian Congo until 1910, situated on the west bank of the Upper Nile in what is now Central Equatoria province in South Sudan and northwest Uganda. Its capital was the town of Lado.

British desire for a Cape to Cairo railway led them to negotiate with the Belgians to exchange the area that became the Lado Enclave for a narrow strip of territory in eastern Congo between Lakes Albert and Tanganyika. These negotiations resulted in the 1894 British-Congolese Treaty, signed on 12 May, under which the British leased all of the Nile basin south of the 10° north latitude to King Leopold II for the period of his lifetime. This area, called the Lado Enclave, linked the Congo with the navigable Nile. The Lado Enclave was important to the Belgian Congo as it included Rejaf, which was the terminus for boats on the Nile, as the rapids there proved a barrier to further travel. Rejaf was the seat of the commander, the only European colonial official within the enclave, who were in place from 1897 to June 1910. Efforts were made to properly defend Lado against any possible incursion by another colonial power, with twelve heavy Krupp fort guns installed in November 1906.

However, there continued to be uncertainty in the enclave with the knowledge that the enclave would revert to British rule upon Leopold's death. As a result, the Belgians were unable to create an effective government, leading to civil unrest within the enclave. At Leopold's death, the Belgians handed over Lado to the British in 1910.

=== Belgian Congo (1908–1960) ===
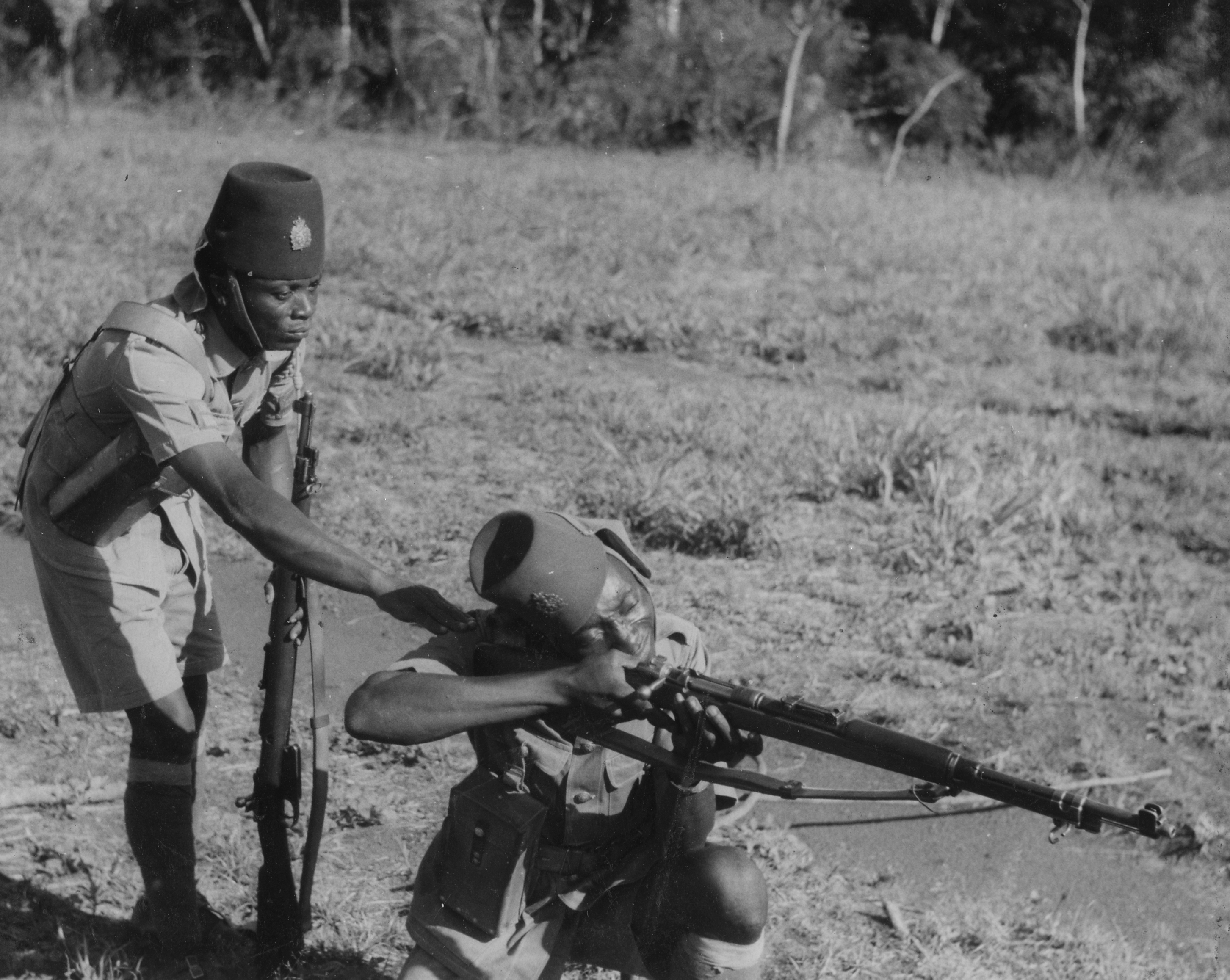
Two Force Publique soldiers in 1943

Leopold achieved international recognition for the Congo Free State in 1885. By the turn of the century, however, the violence used by Free State officials against indigenous Congolese and the ruthless system of economic extraction led to intense diplomatic pressure on Belgium to take official control of the country, which it did in 1908, creating the Belgian Congo.

Belgian rule in the Congo was based on the "colonial trinity" (trinité coloniale) of state, missionary and private company interests. The privileging of Belgian commercial interests meant that large amounts of capital flowed into the Congo and that individual regions became specialised. On many occasions, the interests of the government and private enterprise became closely tied, and the state helped companies break strikes and remove other barriers raised by the indigenous population. The country was split into nesting, hierarchically organised administrative subdivisions, and run uniformly according to a set "native policy" (politique indigène). This was in contrast to the British and the French, who generally favoured the system of indirect rule whereby traditional leaders were retained in positions of authority under colonial oversight. During World War I, Congolese troops participated in offensives against German forces in the area of modern-day Rwanda and Burundi which were placed under Belgian occupation. The Congo had a high degree of racial segregation. The large numbers of white immigrants who moved to the Congo after the end of World War II came from across the social spectrum, but were always treated as superior to black citizens.

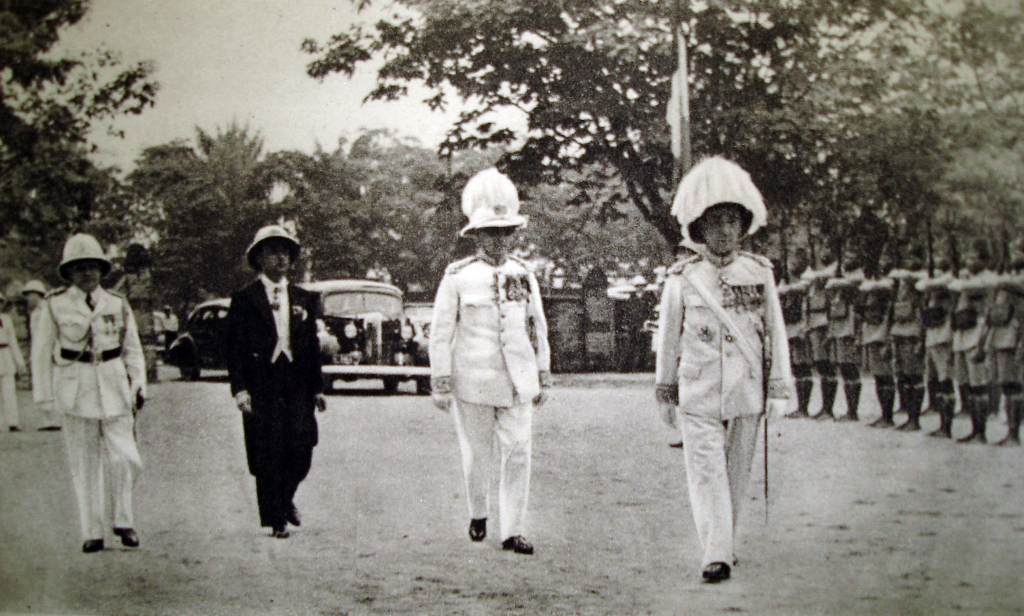
Belgian colonial officials in Léopoldville, 1938

Congolese troops participated in World War II and were instrumental in forcing the Italians out of their East African colonies during the East African Campaign. During the 1940s and 1950s, the Congo had extensive urbanization, and the colonial administration began various development programmes aimed at making the territory into a "model colony". One of the results was the development of a new middle class of Europeanised African "évolués" in the cities. By the 1950s the Congo had a wage labour force twice as large as that in any other African colony.

In 1960, as the result of a widespread and increasingly radical pro-independence movement, the Congo achieved independence, becoming the Republic of Congo-Léopoldville under Patrice Lumumba and Joseph Kasa-Vubu. Poor relations between factions within the Congo, the continued involvement of Belgium in Congolese affairs, and intervention by major parties of the Cold War led to a five-year-long period of war and political instability, known as the Congo Crisis, from 1960 to 1965. This ended with the seizure of power by Joseph-Désiré Mobutu.

== Ruanda-Urundi ==
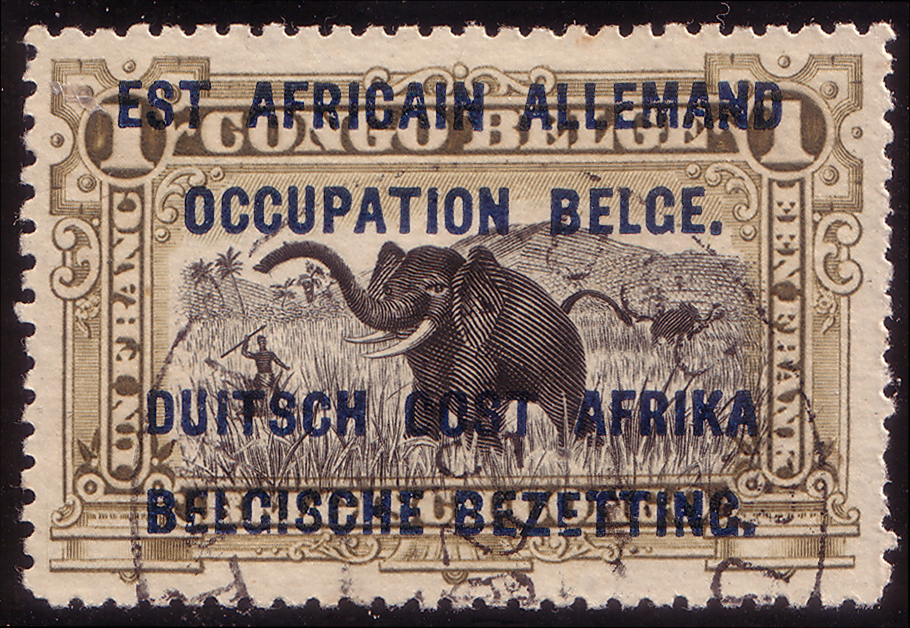
Belgian Congo stamp overstamped with "German East Africa: Belgian Occupation" (1916)

Ruanda-Urundi was a part of German East Africa under Belgian military occupation from 1916 to 1924 in the aftermath of World War I, when a military expedition had removed the Germans from the colony. It became a Class B League of Nations mandate allotted to Belgium, from 1924 to 1945. It was designated as a United Nations trust territory, still under Belgian administration, until 1962, when it developed into the independent states of Rwanda and Burundi. After Belgium began administering the colony, it generally maintained the policies established by the Germans, including indirect rule via local Tutsi rulers, and a policy of ethnic identity cards (later retained in the Republic of Rwanda). Revolts and violence against Tutsi, known as the Rwandan Revolution, occurred in the events leading to independence.

== Minor possessions ==
=== Santo Tomás, Guatemala (1843–1854) ===
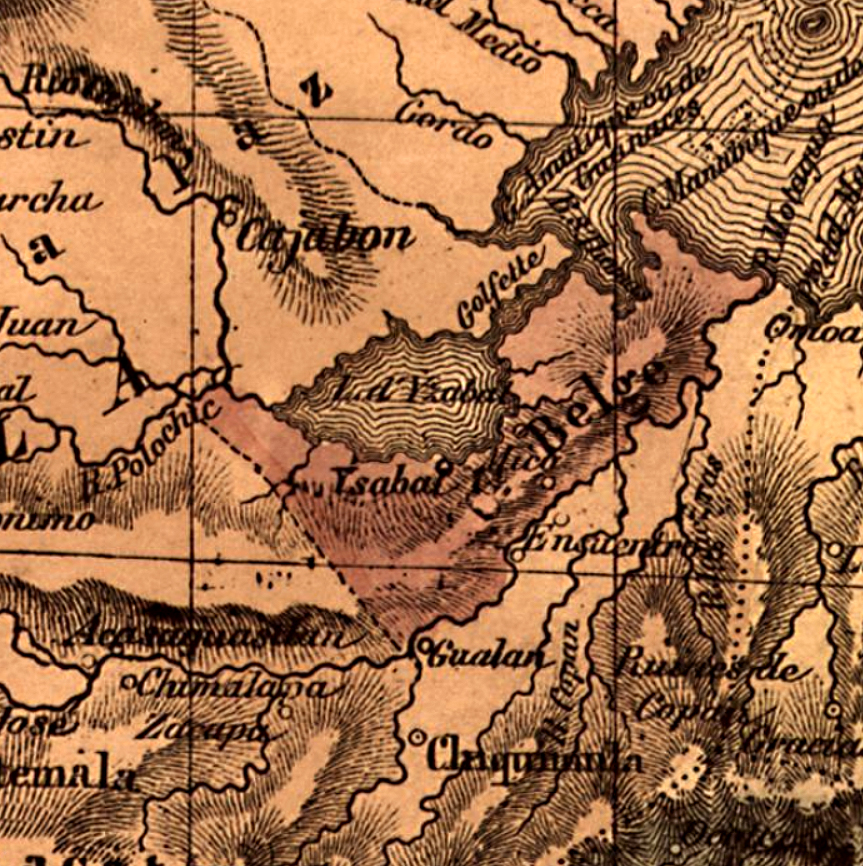
Belgian settlement in Guatemala, 1845

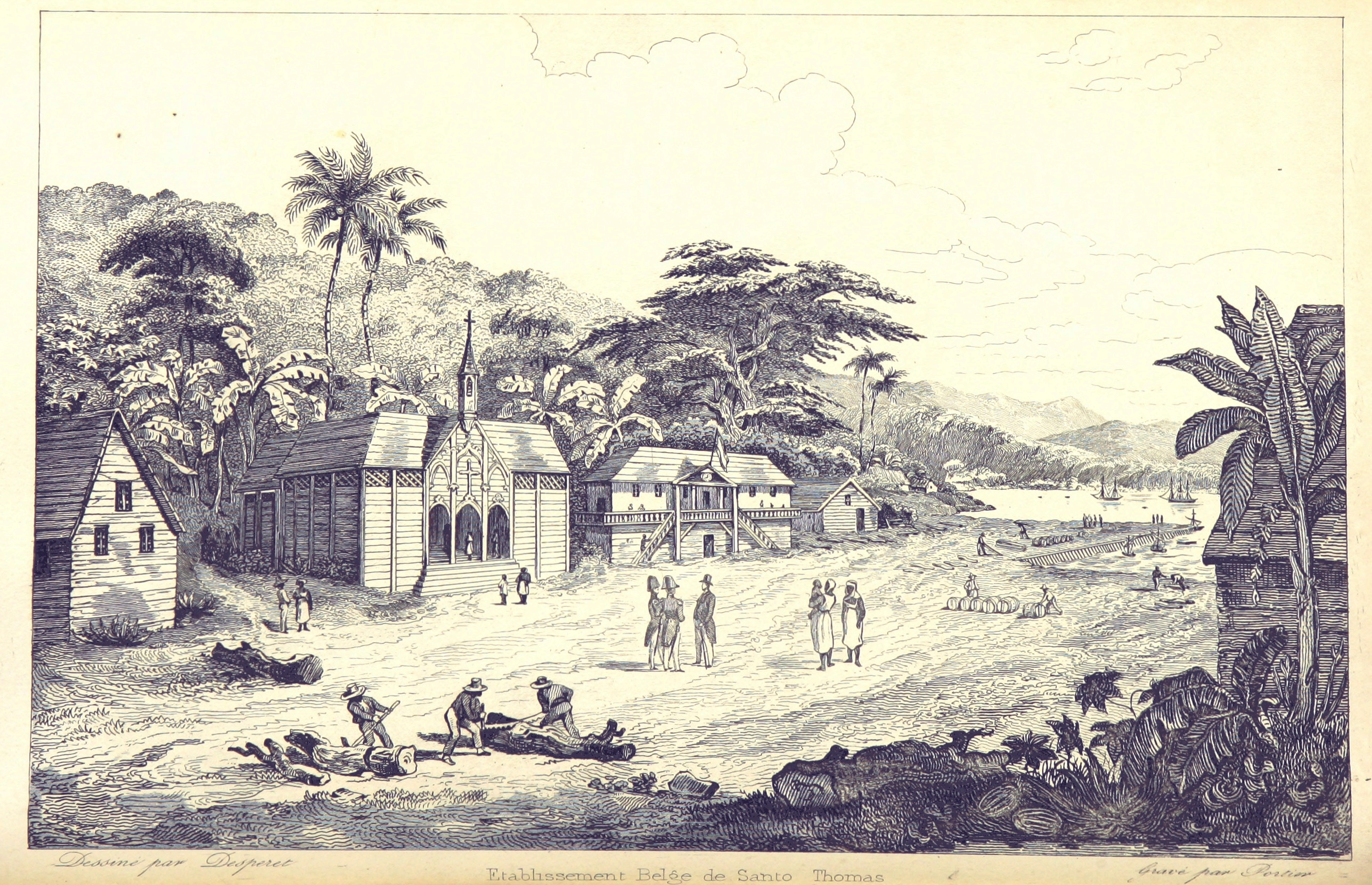
View of the Belgian settlement of Santo Thomas

In 1842, a ship sent by King Leopold I arrived in Guatemala; the Belgians observed the natural riches of the department of Izabal and decided to settle in Santo Tomas de Castilla and build infrastructure in the region. Rafael Carrera gave them the region in exchange for sixteen thousand pesos every year from the government of Guatemala. On 4 May 1843, the Guatemalan parliament issued a decree giving the district of Santo Tomás "in perpetuity" to the Compagnie belge de colonisation, a private Belgian company under Leopold's protection. It replaced the failed British Eastern Coast of Central America Commercial and Agricultural Company. Belgian colonizing efforts in Guatemala ceased in 1854, due to lack of financing and high mortality due to yellow fever and malaria, endemic diseases of the tropical climate.

==== Status ====
While the Compagnie belge de colonisation was granted the land in perpetuity, the concession did not become a colony in the political sense. Article 4 of the May 1842 Acte de concession clearly stated that the cession of the territory to the Belgian company did not involve, implicitly or explicitly, a cession of sovereignty over the territory, which would forever remain under the sovereignty and jurisdiction of Guatemala. Article 5 stated that upon their arrival on the territory, the settlers would become Guatemalan natives (indigènes de Guatemala) fully subject to the existing constitution and laws of the country, relinquishing their former Belgian or other national birthright, as well as any claim to any privileges or immunity as foreigners. Justice was to be administered by judges named by the government (art. 40). No foreign troops were to be allowed on the concession and Guatemalan troops were to garrison two forts that were to be built near the projected new town. (art. 18–22)

=== Tianjin Concession (1900–1931) ===
The city of Tianjin (Tientsin), a treaty port in China (1860–1945) included nine foreign-controlled concessions (Chinese: 租界; pinyin: zūjiè). In the years following the Boxer Rebellion, the diplomat Maurice Joostens negotiated a concession for Belgium. The Belgian concession was proclaimed on 7 November 1900 and spanned some 100 hectares (250 acres). Although Belgian companies invested in Tianjin, especially in the city's tram system, the Belgian concession remained inactive. An agreement was reached between the Belgian and Chinese governments in August 1929 to return the concession to China. The agreement was approved by the Belgian parliament on 13 July 1931.

In the late 19th century, Belgian engineers were employed on construction of the Beijing–Hankou Railway, leading the Belgian government to unsuccessfully claim a concession in Hankou (Hankow). The Belgian claim was never formally recognized and the proposal was dropped in 1908.

=== Tangier International Zone (1925–1956) ===
In 1880 and 1905, Belgium was a signatory to the Madrid Convention and the Algeciras Conference on Morocco. Thus, from 1925 to 1940 and from 1945 to 1956, Belgium was one of the nine nations that administered the Tangier International Zone. The last two administrators (1954–1956) were Belgian, Belgium was also subordinate to the customs and financial administration and the gendarmerie in Tangier.

=== Isola Comacina (1919) ===
In 1919, the island of Comacina was bequeathed to King Albert I for a year, and became an enclave under the sovereignty of Belgium. After a year, it was returned to the Italian State in 1920. The Consul of Belgium and the president of the Brera Academy established a charitable foundation with the goal of building a village for artists and a hotel.

== See also ==
- History of Belgium
- Atrocities in the Congo Free State
- Foreign relations of Belgium
- Rio Nuñez incident
- Société Belge d'Études Coloniales (est. 1894)
- Colonial University of Belgium (est. 1920 in Antwerp)
- Institut Royal Colonial Belge (est. 1928)
- Belgium–Mexico relations

== Bibliography ==
- Anstey, Roger (1966). King Leopold's Legacy: The Congo under Belgian Rule 1908–1960. Oxford: Oxford University Press.
- Nzongola-Ntalaja, Georges (2002). The Congo From Leopold to Kabila: A People's History. London: Zed Books. ISBN 978-1-84277-052-8.
- Freund, Bill (1998). The Making of Contemporary Africa: The Development of African Society since 1800 (2nd ed.). Basingstoke: Palgrave-Macmillan. ISBN 978-0-333-69872-3.
- Pakenham, Thomas (1992). The Scramble for Africa: the White Man's Conquest of the Dark Continent from 1876 to 1912 (13th ed.). London: Abacus. ISBN 978-0-349-10449-2.
- Poddar, Prem, and Lars Jensen, eds., A historical companion to postcolonial literatures: Continental Europe and Its Empires (Edinburgh UP, 2008), "Belgium and its colonies" pp 6–57. excerpt
- Turner, Thomas (2007). The Congo Wars: Conflict, Myth, and Reality (2nd ed.). London: Zed Books. ISBN 978-1-84277-688-9.
- Neild, Robert (2015). China's Foreign Places: The Foreign Presence in China in the Treaty Port Era, 1840–1943. Hong Kong: Hong Kong University Press. ISBN 978-988-8139-28-6.
