= Paul Jean Clays =

Belgian artist (1819–1900)

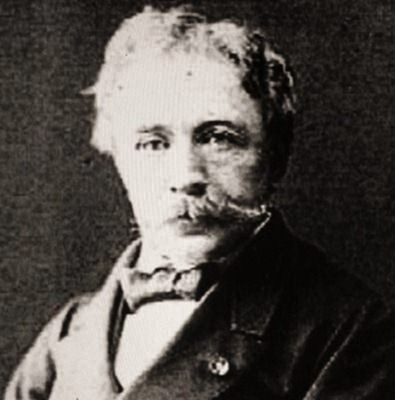
- Born: 27 November 1819; Bruges
- Died: 10 February 1900 (aged 80); Brussels
- Known for: Marine Painting

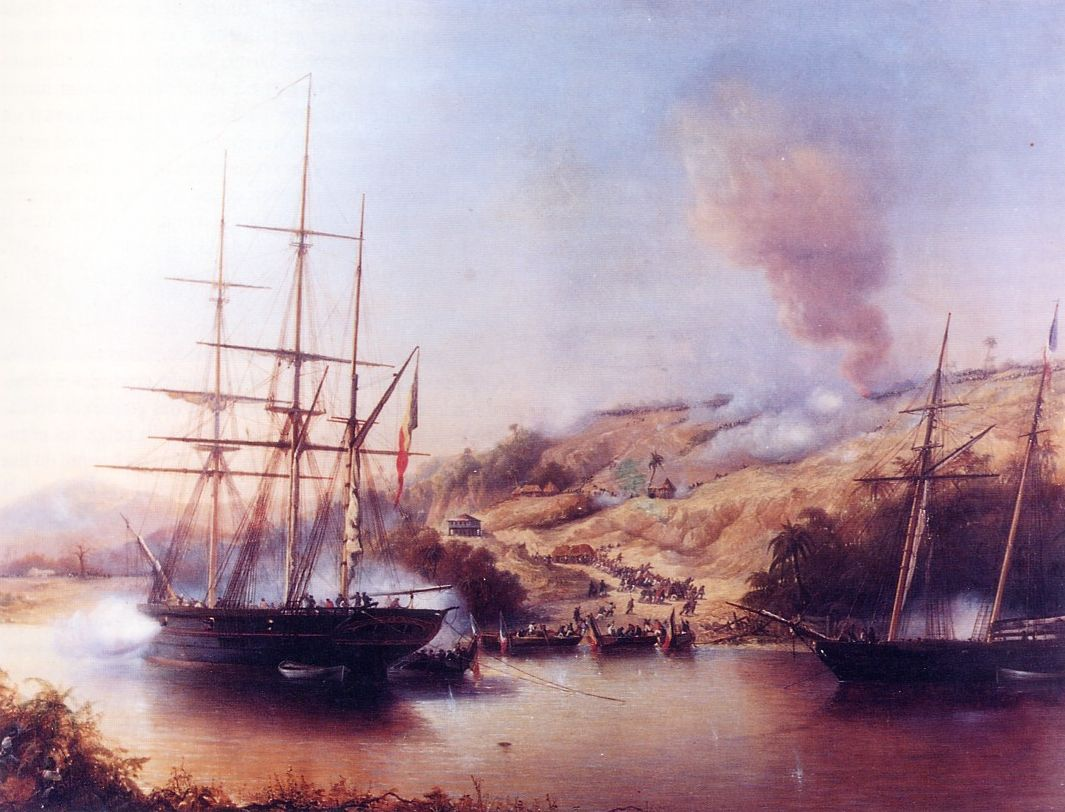
Belgian and French warships during the Rio Nuñez Incident by Paul Jean Clays

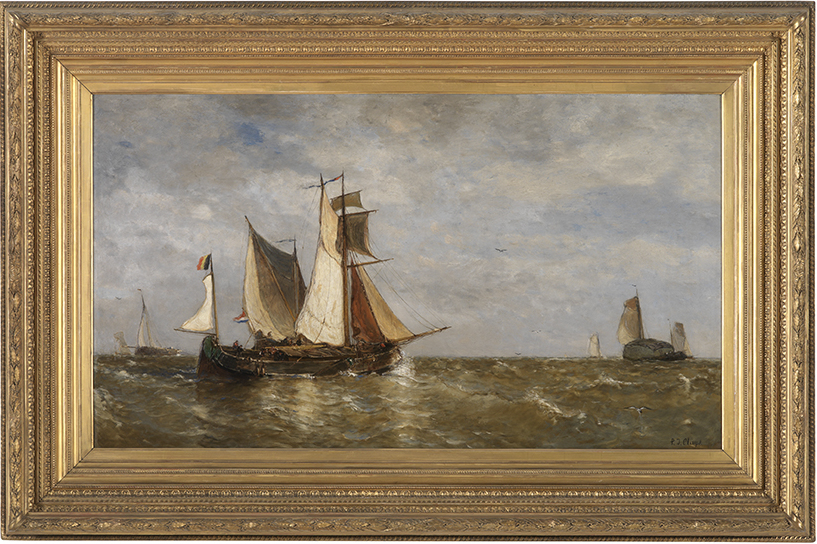
The Scheldt Estuary by Paul Jean Clays

Paul Jean Clays (27 November 1819 – 10 February 1900) was a Belgian artist known for his marine paintings.

== Biography ==
In 1851 he made his debut at the Paris Salon and, while he tried to stay in the mainstream, his art was heralded by those who were looking for a change to more realism.

In 1852 he married Marie-Isaure (d. 1860), the daughter of the director of the Brussels Observatory, and moved to Antwerp where he lived from 1852 to 1856; it was during this period that his fortunes began to improve.

In 1856 he and his family moved to Brussels where he became a prolific artist, specializing in scenes along the Scheldt. He exhibited a number of works at the Exposition Universelelle of 1867 and the critic Burger-Thoré described him as one of the greatest marine painters of the time.

In 1868 he became a member of the Société Libre des Beaux-Arts, a society founded on 1 March 1868 to help promote the works of artists who were interested in their individual interpretations of nature. He was a frequent exhibitor at the many exhibition halls in Europe and exhibited many pieces at the Paris Salon.

== Overview of his work ==
He was one of the most esteemed marine painters of his time, and early in his career he preferred a sincere study of nature rather than extravagant and artificial conventionality of most of his predecessors. He painted rivers, estuaries, roadsteads and ports. Breaking away from old traditions, he also rejected the restrictions imposed on him by his master, the marine painter Théodore Gudin (1802–1880). Instead, he sought to "only to give truthful expression to the nature that delighted his eyes", rendering atmosphere, waters, horizons, and sky.

Clays set his palette with clean strong hues, and sylistic choice that contrasted with more like the rusty, smoky muted tones. If he was not a "luminist" in the modern use of the word, he deserves at any rate to be classed with the founders of the modern naturalistic school. He remained faithful to this interpretation, without any important changes, in his career and attracted those minds which aspired to be bold, and won over those which were moderate. Clays soon took his place among renowned Belgian painters of his generation, and his pictures, sold at high prices, are to be seen in most public and private galleries.

== Works ==
We may mention, among others, The Beach at Ault, Boats in a Dutch Port, and Dutch Boats in the Flushing Roads, the last in the National Gallery, London. In the Brussels gallery are The Port of Antwerp, Coast near Ostend, and a Calm on the Scheldt; in the Antwerp museum, The Meuse at Dordrecht; in the Pinakothek at Munich, The Open North Sea; in the Metropolitan Museum of Art, New York, The Festival of the Freedom of the Scheldt at Antwerp in 1863; in the palace of the king of the Belgians, Arrival of Queen Victoria at Ostend in 1857; in the Bruges academy, Port of Feirugudo, Portugal. Clays was a member of several Academies, Belgian and foreign, and of the Order of Leopold (Belgium), the Legion of Honour, etc. See Camille Lemonnier, Histoire des Beaux-Arts (Brussels, 1887).
