= Rio Nuñez incident =

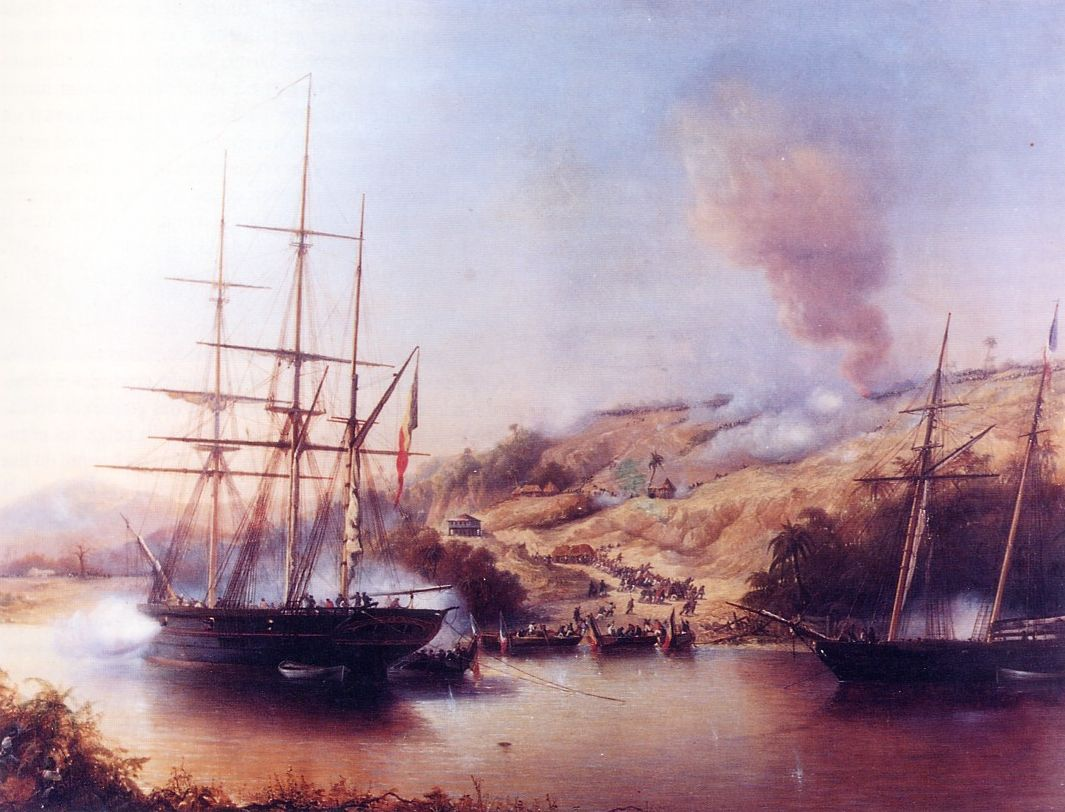
Belgian and French warships during the Rio Nuñez Incident by Paul Jean Clays

The Rio Nuñez incident (also known as the Rio Nuñez affair (French: Affaire du Rio Nuñez)) was an international incident which occurred in 1849 on the Nunez River near Boké, in modern-day Guinea. As a result of a local power struggle, a joint Franco-Belgian squadron bombarded a village near the river, which damaged property owned by two British merchants.

== Background ==
=== Anglo-French rivalry ===
During the 1840s and 50s, West Africa was the site of fledgling colonial rivalry between European powers. The Nuñez region lay between French Senegal and the British colonies of Gambia and Sierra Leone. French traders were increasingly challenged by commercial trading expeditions from Britain, Belgium and America.

=== Early Belgian colonial ambitions in the region ===
Due to his marriage to Princess Charlotte of Wales, which would have made him prince consort of Britain had she not died at 21, Leopold I began studying the British Empire and had become a strong supporter of colonialism. Once he accepted the Belgian throne, Leopold was thus convinced that the new country needed its own colonies. The Nunez River had been a colonial interest of Belgium since 1845 but was being set up more as a trading outpost than a true colony. One of the first merchants to take an interest in the region was Abraham Cohen, who persuaded the King that it was a worthy opportunity. The Belgian Navy schooner Louise Marie was sent to investigate the region on 17 December 1847; it arrived in the Bay of Gorée on 11 January 1848. The ship stayed in the Rio Nunez in February and March and her crew learned that the river had the potential to be successfully exploited except during the rainy season.

=== Local power struggle ===
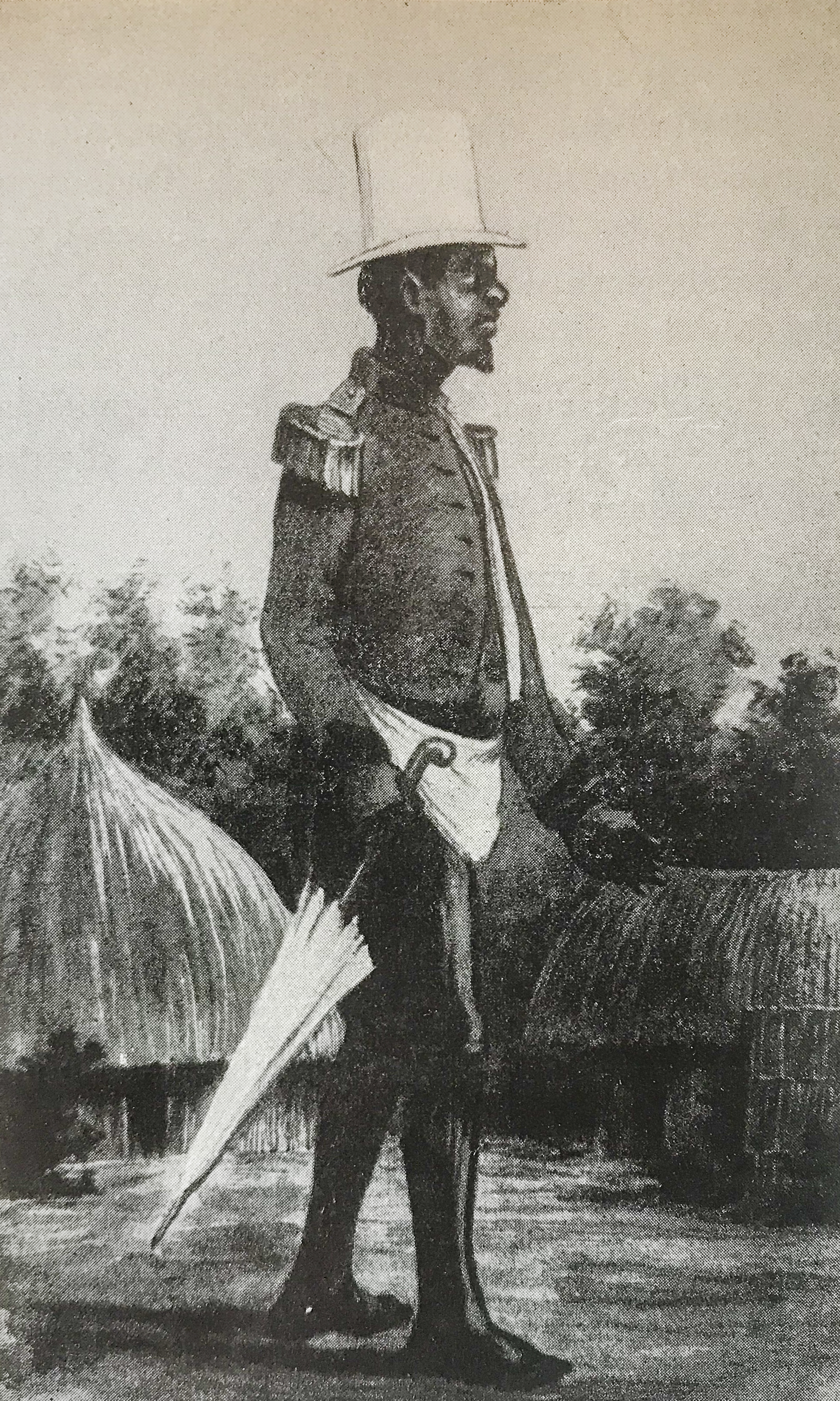
Lamina, King of the Nalous.

The local African peoples were split into two groups ever since the death of the king of the Landoumas in late 1846, who occupied the upper section of the river beyond Rapass (or Ropaz). One group supported Tongo who was also Britain's choice (at the beginning), and another supported Mayoré, his brother, and was supported by France (at the beginning). Mayoré had also gained the support of the Nalous, who had pledged their armed support. That angered Tongo, who set fire to Walkaria but was beaten by Joura, the brother of Lamina, King of the Nalous, and was forced to retreat inland. The proxy war led to a treaty between Britain and France that forbade either party from intervening on the river. Van Haverbeke, the captain of Louise Marie, seized the opportunity by signing a convention with Lamina where the latter ceded to the King of the Belgians both sides of the Nunez River, up to one mile inland, from the backwater upstream of Rapass to the backwater downstream of Victoria. Against regular payments by the Belgians, he would also provide them with protection. Louise Marie then sailed to Belgium and returned to the Nunez River to bring the treaty that was to be ratified. Meanwhile, Cohen was to be in charge of commerce in the region. Their return was not well received by the French regional commander, Louis Édouard Bouët-Willaumez, who thought the river to be very important to France and was unhappy to have been ordered by his government to protect the Belgian at all cost. On 11 February 1849, Lamina came aboard the schooner and received to his great pleasure a uniform complete with epaulettes from the Belgians.

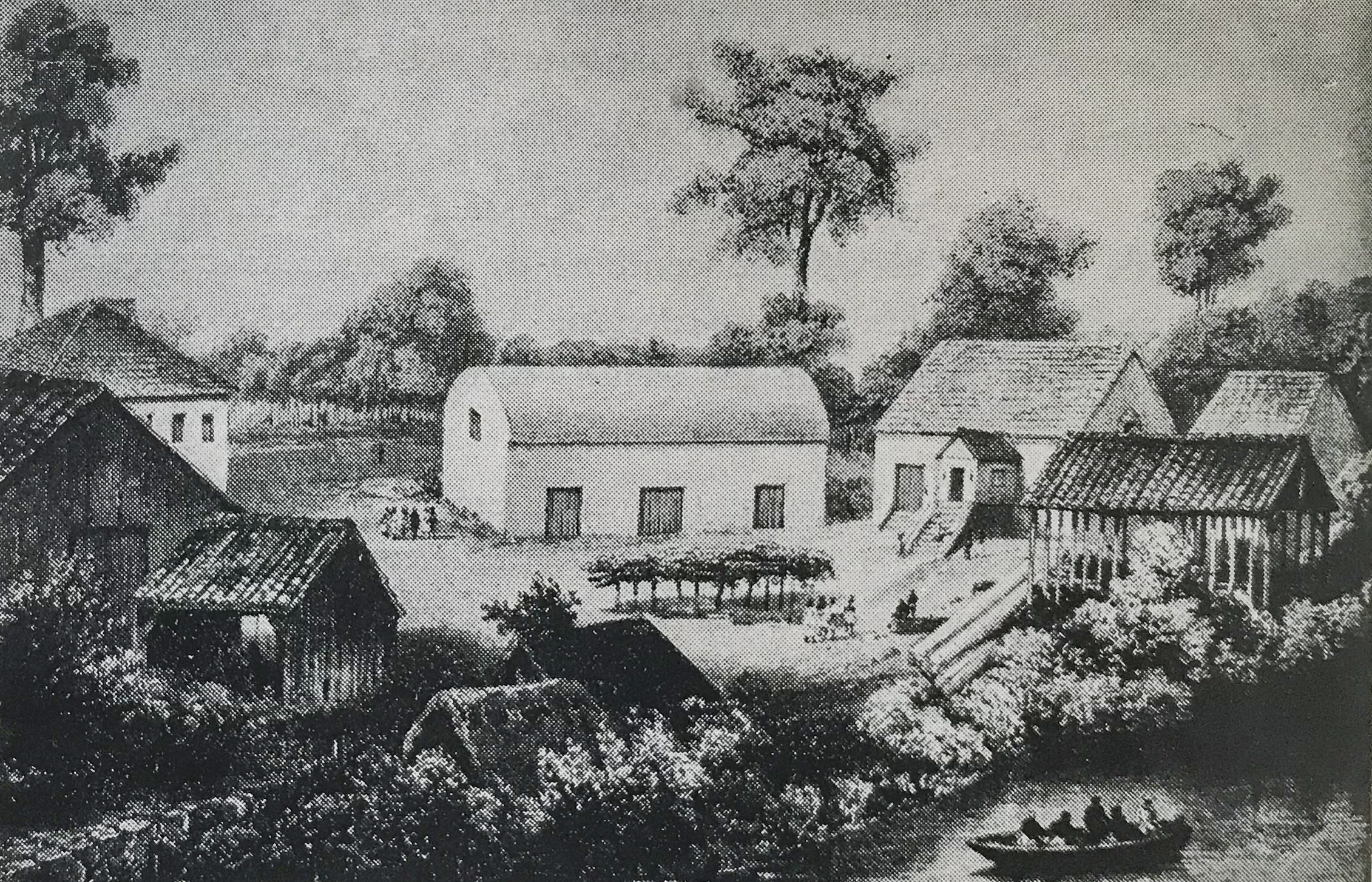
The French-Belgian commercial outpost of Bicaise on the Nunez River

Once the treaty with Lamina signed, the Belgians wanted to make an agreement with Mayoré, who was becoming less and less hospitable to Europeans. Mayoré had expulsed Ismaël Tay, a Frenchman and his own brother in-law, and kidnapped his wife-and child, whom he felt threatened by since he could one day have a claim to his throne. The Belgians organised an expedition with Bicaise, a local merchant, and discovered Mayoré's people constructing a building meant for two British merchants, Braithwait and Martin, on land owned by Bicaise without his authorisation. Braithwait and Martin had arrived in the area at the same time as the Louise Marie and had made many gifts to Mayoré to earn his favour. The Belgian officers then disembarked and set up near Bicaise's house which was on a plateau. They became surrounded by about 400 locals armed with rifles. When the Belgians aimed at Mayoré's hut, the locals soon began pleading not to destroy their village, declared that Mayoré was a drunk oppressor and confirmed Ismael's complaints. Van Haverbeke then went to see Mayoré and demanded an answer from him by 11pm or to except an attack. At around 10pm, they received a positive answer and left the village with Ismael's wife and child, who had been saved without Mayoré's knowledge.

On the 27th, Van Haverbeke learned of Mayore's plans to take back the wife and child and ordered his troops to inspect every ship going up river. On the same day, the British ship Favourite's commander went to see Haverbeke to protest his actions on account of Britain's treaty with France, but he admitted that his superiors had misinterpreted the treaty, which did not concern Belgium or any other third parties. Ismael then learned that his family had been taken prisoner again by Mayoré. French and Belgians then met and decided to overthrow Mayoré and name Lamina as his successor. A party was sent to make a last effort to get the prisoners back. Meanwhile, the locals told the expedition that the two British traders had brought about 30 guns the day before to Mayoré's forces while they flew the white flag. Later that day, a delegation of Foulhas arrived and denounced Mayoré, and Landouma dignitaries (Mayore's own peoples) came to say that Mayore was acting under influence of the British traders and that unlike their king, the Landouma chiefs wanted to give Ismael's family back. Five days later, on the 16th, after many talks between French and Belgian command, the blockade of the river by the Louise Marie had started. On the 17th, a letter was sent to Braithwait and Martin to leave the area or to have their possessions destroyed by the attack. Two days later, they arrived at Bicaise's home with a peace offering on behalf of Mayore, but that was distrusted by the French and the Belgians, who held the view that they could not trust Mayore. On the 20th, a letter from the Britons was received that stated that they would hold the French and Belgian governments responsible of any damage that they would suffer, as they refused to leave Boké. On the 23rd, Tongo and 150 of his men arrived holding red flags. They were then armed by the French. On the same day, the French intercepted Braithwait and Martin as they attempted to flee and kept them on board until the attack was over. An official declaration of war was then sent to Mayore.

== Attack ==
On the following morning, 24 March 1848, the high grounds were full of Mayore's men, armed with rifles. On the merchants' hut, the Union Jack and a white flag was visible. The French officer de la Tocnaye decided to open fire on the village to set it on fire, an action that was soon followed by the other ship. After about 15 minutes, the landing was ordered to launch and soon attained the riverside. The men were supported by highly-successful mortar fire from the warships. Boké was taken within 40 minutes, with the village burned along with the British merchants' stores.

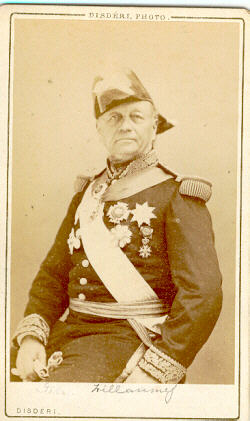
The French regional commander, Admiral Édouard Bouët-Willaumez.

== Aftermath ==
Bouët-Willaumez hoped that the Nunez region could be formally annexed as a protectorate of the French colonial empire. The attack, far from securing the region for France, went contrary to his plans. Both France and Belgium led a cover-up. Attempts by the British Prime Minister, Viscount Palmerston, to force France to pay reparations for the incident were ultimately unsuccessful and the affair lasted four years.

The incident formed part of the "prelude to the Scramble for Africa" and, as Bouët-Willaumez had hoped, did lead to increased French control of the Nunez. In 1866, French forces occupied Boké. The affair was therefore one of the first signs of future French hegemony in West Africa in what would become French West Africa.

== See also ==
- Belgian colonial empire
- Guillaume Delcourt

== Sources ==
- Anrys, H., de Decker de Brandeken, J-M., Eyngenraam, P., Liénart, J-C., Poskin, E., Poullet, E., Vandensteen, P., Van Schoonbeek, P., Verleyen, J. (1992). La Force Navale - De l'Amirauté de Flandre à la Force Navale Belge. Comité pour l'Étude de l'Histoire de la Marine Militaire en Belgique, Tielt, Impremerie Lannoo. pp. 111–115: "L'affaire du Rio Nunez".
- Braithwaite, Roderick (1996). "The Rio Nunez Affair: New perspectives on a significant event in nineteenth century Franco-British colonial rivalry". Revue française d'histoire d'outre-mer. 83 (311): 25–45. doi:10.3406/outre.1996.3428.
- Suret-Canale, Jean (1980). "Guinea in the Colonial System 1". Essais d'Histoire africaine. London: Hurst: 111–147.
- Demougeot, A. (April–June 1938). "Histoire du Nunez". Bulletin du Comité d'Études Historiques et Scientifiques de l'A.O.F. 21 (2): 177–289.
- Braithwaite, Roderick (1996). Palmerston and Africa: the Rio Nunez affair, Competition, Diplomacy and Justice. London: British Academic Press. ISBN 978-1860641091.
- Ansiaux, Robert Raymond (2006). Early Belgian Colonial Efforts: The Long and Fateful Shadow of Leopold I. Arlington: University of Texas at Arlington.
- Du Colombier Thémistocle (1920). Une expédition Franco-Belge en Guinée. La Campagne de le goëlette belge Marie-Louise dans la Colonie Belge du Rio Nunez (1849), Bulletin de la Société Belge d'Études coloniales.
- Leconte, Louis (1952). Les Ancêtres de Notre Force Navale. Brussels, Pauwels Fils. pp. 161–199: "L'affaire du Rio Nunez".
- Maroy, Ch. (1930). "La colonie belge du Rio Nunez et l'expédition franco-belge de Bokié en 1849". Bulletin d'Études et d'Informations de l'École supérieure du Commerce, Antwerp, September–October edition, P.47.
- Leconte, Louis (1945), La marine de guerre belge (1830-1940), Brussels, La Renaissance du Livre, coll. « "Notre Passé" », 1945, chap. 5 (« Le service Ostende-Douvres. L'affaire du Rio-Nunez. »), pp. 51–64.
