= Bill Freund (historian) =

American historian (1944–2020)

- Freund, c. 2008
- Born: William Mark Freund; July 6, 1944; Chicago, Illinois, United States
- Died: August 17, 2020 (aged 76); Durban, KwaZulu-Natal, South Africa

Academic background
- Education: University of Chicago; Yale University

Academic work
- Discipline: African history
- Institutions: University of Natal, later University of KwaZulu-Natal
- Main interests: Economic history of Africa, particularly South Africa

William Mark Freund (6 July 1944 – 17 August 2020) was an American historian and academic, widely recognised as an authority on the economic and labour history of Africa, particularly South Africa.

A self-described materialist, Freund is best known for his book The Making of Contemporary Africa (1984), which received widespread acclaim as a comprehensive survey of the social and economic history of Africa in the colonial and post-colonial periods. He also wrote extensively on topics related to African labour and urban history.

Freund spent much of his academic career teaching at the University of Natal, which later became the University of KwaZulu-Natal.

== Biography ==
Freund was born in Chicago, Illinois on 6 July 1944. His parents were Austrian Jewish refugees who had arrived in the United States in 1939. He studied at the University of Chicago and later at Yale University, where he earned a PhD in 1971 with a dissertation on Dutch rule at the Cape during the Batavian Republic period (1803–06). He later cited Eric Hobsbawm as a key intellectual influence.

Freund held a number of short-term academic positions in both the United States and Africa. Notably, he taught at Ahmadu Bello University in Nigeria from 1974 to 1978 and briefly at the University of Dar es Salaam in Tanzania. He struggled to secure a tenured position until the publication of his landmark work, The Making of Contemporary Africa (1984), which has been described as a "landmark in African historiography".

The Making of Contemporary Africa offers a comprehensive overview of Africa's social and economic history in the colonial and post-colonial periods. It was widely praised for its depth of research, including a bibliography spanning 55 pages, and has been described as "the defining book of his life".

In 1986, Freund was appointed Professor of Economic History at the University of Natal in Durban, South Africa (later incorporated into the University of KwaZulu-Natal), where he developed an interest in development studies. That same year, he co-founded the journal Transformation, drawing inspiration from the New Left Review.

Freund was best known as an economic historian with particular interests in capital accumulation and labour relations. He described his theoretical stance as "materialist" rather than explicitly Marxist. His first major publication was Capital and Labour in the Nigerian Tin Mines (1981), influenced by the work of Charles van Onselen. He later published the influential synthesis The African Worker (1988) and contributed significantly to the urban history of Africa, especially the history of Durban.

During the transition from apartheid in South Africa, Freund served as an expert in political economy for committees convened by the African National Congress to develop post-apartheid economic policy. Although sympathetic to African nationalism, he maintained critical distance from the ANC and expressed skepticism regarding aspects of its development strategy.

In 2006, a festschrift was published in his honour, and a special issue of African Studies was later devoted to assessing his scholarly legacy. His memoir, Bill Freund: An Historian's Passage to Africa, was published posthumously in 2021. He died in Durban on 17 August 2020.

== Selected publications ==
- Capital and Labour in the Nigerian Tin Mines (Humanities Press, 1981)
- The Making of Contemporary Africa: The Development of African Society since 1800 (Macmillan, 1984; 2nd ed., 1998; 3rd ed., 2016)
- The African Worker (Cambridge University Press, 1988)
- Insiders and Outsiders: The Indian Working Class of Durban, 1910-1990 (University of Natal Press, 1995)
- The African City: A History (Cambridge University Press, 2007)
- Twentieth-Century South Africa: A Developmental History (Cambridge University Press, 2018)
- Bill Freund: An Historian’s Passage to Africa (Wits University Press, 2021; posthumous autobiography)
