= 2025 Pulitzer Prize =

Awards for journalism and related fields

The 2025 Pulitzer Prizes were awarded on May 5, 2025 by the Pulitzer Prize Board for works created during the 2024 calendar year.

== Prizes ==
Winners and finalists for the prizes are listed below, with the winners marked in bold.

=== Journalism ===
Public Service
**ProPublica**, "for urgent reporting by Kavitha Surana, Lizzie Presser, Cassandra Jaramillo and Stacy Kranitz about pregnant women who died after doctors delayed urgently needed care for fear of violating vague 'life of the mother' exceptions in states with strict abortion laws."
The Boston Globe, with contributions from the Organized Crime and Corruption Reporting Project, "for its sweeping coverage of the financial mismanagement of a major hospital chain, exposing how corporate malfeasance, personal greed, and government neglect led to compromised care and deaths."
The New York Times, "for relentless reporting by Dave Philipps that forced Congress and the Pentagon to acknowledge the devastating brain injuries U.S. troops were suffering from the effects of repeated low level blasts during weapons training."

Breaking News Reporting
**Staff of The Washington Post**, "for urgent and illuminating coverage of the July 13 attempt to assassinate then-presidential candidate Donald Trump, including detailed story-telling and sharp analysis that coupled traditional police reporting with audio and visual forensics."
Staff of the Associated Press, "for fast, comprehensive and authoritative coverage of the assassination attempt on then-presidential candidate Donald Trump, including vivid details from the scene followed by the first reporting on gaps in security measures by the Secret Service and local law enforcement."
Staff of The News & Observer, Raleigh, N.C., and The Charlotte (N.C.) Observer, "for collaborating on comprehensive and community-focused reporting on Hurricane Helene, which killed more than 200 people and damaged 70,000 homes and businesses in the western part of the state."

Investigative Reporting
**Staff of Reuters**, "for a boldly reported exposé of lax regulation in the U.S. and abroad that makes fentanyl, one of the world’s deadliest drugs, inexpensive and widely available to users in the United States."
Christopher Weaver, Anna Wilde Mathews, Mark Maremont, Tom McGinty and Andrew Mollica of The Wall Street Journal, "for a lucid, comprehensive series that revealed how insurance companies gamed the Medicare Advantage system and collected billions of dollars for nonexistent ailments while shunting expensive cases onto the public."
Staff of the Associated Press and FRONTLINE, in collaboration with the Howard Center for Investigative Journalism, "for a three-year investigation involving dozens of reporters and the creation of a database to document more than 1,000 deaths around the country in which police officers subdued victims with methods intended to be non-lethal."

Explanatory Reporting
**Azam Ahmed, Matthieu Aikins, contributing writer, and Christina Goldbaum of The New York Times**, "for an authoritative examination of how the United States sowed the seeds of its own failure in Afghanistan, primarily by supporting murderous militia that drove civilians to the Taliban."
Alexia Campbell, April Simpson and Pratheek Rebala of the Center for Public Integrity; Nadia Hamdan of Reveal; and Roy Hurst, contributor, Mother Jones, "for using innovative technology, archival research and personal storytelling to reveal how land titles granted to formerly enslaved Black men and women in the wake of the Civil War were unjustly revoked."
Annie Waldman, Duaa Eldeib, Max Blau and Maya Miller of ProPublica, "for a deep and haunting examination of how insurance companies quietly, and with little public scrutiny, deny mental health services to those in need."

Local Reporting
**Alissa Zhu, Nick Thieme and Jessica Gallagher of The Baltimore Banner and The New York Times**, "for a compassionate investigative series that captured the breathtaking dimensions of Baltimore’s fentanyl crisis and its disproportionate impact on older Black men, creating a sophisticated statistical model that The Banner shared with other newsrooms."
Katey Rusch and Casey Smith, contributors, San Francisco Chronicle, in collaboration with the University of California, Berkeley Investigative Reporting Program, "for a multiyear investigation into a secret system of legal settlements that concealed California police misconduct for decades and kept offending officers in positions of power."
Mike Reicher, Lynda Mapes and Fiona Martin of The Seattle Times, "for their investigative series revealing how the Washington state government spent $1 million per day on construction that failed to safeguard either the salmon or the tribal treaty rights it was meant to protect."

National Reporting
**Staff of The Wall Street Journal**, "for chronicling political and personal shifts of the richest person in the world, Elon Musk, including his turn to conservative politics, his use of legal and illegal drugs and his private conversations with Russian President Vladimir Putin."
Jennifer Gollan and Susie Neilson of the San Francisco Chronicle, "for an immersive and revelatory series that exposed the soaring death toll tied to police pursuits and detailed the near-total immunity that shields officers who initiate deadly chases."
Staff of The Washington Post, "for a sweeping examination of the human and environmental toll of Hurricane Helene in western North Carolina, including stories about the arrival of conspiracy theorists in one town and the efforts of residents of another to rebuild three months later."

International Reporting
**Declan Walsh and the Staff of The New York Times**, "for their revelatory investigation of the conflict in Sudan, including reporting on foreign influence and the lucrative gold trade fueling it, and chilling forensic accounts of the Sudanese forces responsible for atrocities and famine."
Staff of The Wall Street Journal, "for courageous, cool-headed reporting by imprisoned journalist Evan Gershkovich and his colleagues that revealed a previously unknown Russian intelligence agency, and for gripping work on the workings of Russia’s secret services."
Staff of The Washington Post, "for haunting accountability journalism that documented Israeli atrocities in the Gaza strip and investigated the killings of Palestinian journalists, paramedics and a 6-year-old girl whose recorded pleas for help touched a nerve around the world."

Feature Writing
**Mark Warren, contributor, Esquire**, "for a sensitive portrait of a Baptist pastor and small town mayor who died by suicide after his secret digital life was exposed by a right-wing news site."
Anand Gopal, contributing writer, The New Yorker, "for deeply reported narrative of a woman’s life before and after she is imprisoned at an isolated detention camp in eastern Syria, illustrating how love and family intersect with larger geopolitical concerns."
Joe Sexton, contributor, The Marshall Project, "for his exclusive inside account of a legal team’s efforts to spare the Parkland high school shooter from the death penalty, a saga of moral complexity, constitutional law and shattering trauma for those involved."

Commentary
**Mosab Abu Toha, contributor, The New Yorker**, "for essays on the physical and emotional carnage in Gaza that combine deep reporting with the intimacy of memoir to convey the Palestinian experience of more than a year and a half of war with Israel."
Gustavo Arellano of the Los Angeles Times, "for vivid columns reported from across the Southwest that shattered stereotypes and probed complex shifts in politics in an election year when Latinos were pivotal voters."
Jerry Brewer of The Washington Post, "for his perceptive and informed use of sports to examine critical social divisions in America through difficult conversations about race, gender and media bias."

Criticism
**Alexandra Lange, contributing writer, Bloomberg CityLab**, "for graceful and genre-expanding writing about public spaces for families, deftly using interviews, observations and analysis to consider the architectural components that allow children and communities to thrive."
Sara Holdren of New York Magazine, "for insightful theater criticism that combines a reporter's eye and a historian's memory to inform readers about current stage productions."
Vinson Cunningham of The New Yorker, "for illuminating and personal reviews of work that appears on television, streaming services or social media, trenchant criticism that explores contemporary issues and society."

Editorial Writing
**Raj Mankad, Sharon Steinmann, Lisa Falkenberg and Leah Binkovitz of the Houston Chronicle**, "for a powerful series on dangerous train crossings that kept a rigorous focus on the people and communities at risk as the newspaper demanded urgent action."
David Scharfenberg, Alan Wirzbicki and Marcela García of The Boston Globe, "for their politically courageous and deeply reported editorials on how Boston can humanely and effectively close underutilized schools in ways that improve student learning."
Opinion Staff of The New York Times, notably W. J. Hennigan and Kathleen Kingsbury, "for a powerful, graphic series on the potential horrors of nuclear war, raising critical questions for policymakers, and offering recommendations that might strengthen deterrence."

Illustrated Reporting and Commentary
**Ann Telnaes of The Washington Post**, "for delivering piercing commentary on powerful people and institutions with deftness, creativity – and a fearlessness that led to her departure from the news organization after 17 years."
Ernesto Barbieri and Jess Ruliffson, contributors, The Boston Globe, "for ‘True Stories From an ICU,’ a beautiful, funny and frequently haunting depiction of the fragility of human life, with each frame perfectly paced over a seamless scroll."
Iran Martinez, Steve Breen, Jamie Self and Giovanni Moujaes of inewsource.org, San Diego, "for ‘Fentanyl: A Decade of Death,’ which deftly weaves hard data and human stories with effective metaphors to create a powerful visual narrative for a national audience and the local San Diego readership."

Breaking News Photography
**Doug Mills of The New York Times**, "for a sequence of photos of the attempted assassination of then-presidential candidate Donald Trump, including one image that captures a bullet whizzing through the air as he speaks."
Nanna Heitmann, contributor, Tyler Hicks, David Guttenfelder and Nicole Tung, contributor, of The New York Times, "for their persistence in photographing the war in Ukraine capturing the horror for both sides of the intractable conflict that has killed or wounded more than a million Ukrainians and Russians."
Photography Staff of Agence France-Presse, "for a variety of powerful images, shot entirely by a team of Palestinian journalists, that encapsulate the enduring humanity of the people of Gaza amid widespread destruction and loss."

Feature Photography
**Moises Saman, contributor, The New Yorker**, "for his haunting black and white images of Sednaya prison in Syria that capture the traumatic legacy of Assad’s torture chambers, forcing viewers to confront the raw horrors faced by prisoners and contemplate the scars on society. (Moved by the jury from Breaking News Photography.)"
Lynsey Addario, contributor, The New York Times, "for her sensitive and wrenching photo essay of a young Ukrainian girl with a rare eye cancer whose treatment was thwarted by the war."
Photography Staff of Associated Press, "for their brave and gripping imagery from Gaza that steps back from the front lines to chronicle daily life as it continues in a war zone."

Audio Reporting
**Staff of The New Yorker**, "for their “In the Dark” podcast, a combination of compelling storytelling and relentless reporting in the face of obstacles from the U.S. military, a four-year investigation into one of the most high-profile crimes of the Iraq War–the murder of 25 unarmed Iraqi civilians in Haditha."
Dan Taberski, Henry Molofsky, Morgan Jones and Marshall Lewy of Wondery and Audacy's Pineapple Street Studios, "for “Hysterical,” a fascinating series that traced the outbreak of a mysterious and apparently contagious nerve disorder in upstate New York that largely affected young women, and the frustrating efforts to identify it."
Staffs of WNYC and Gothamist, "for their revelatory investigation into decades of sexual assault of female inmates on Rikers Island."

=== Books, drama, and music ===
Fiction
**James**, by Percival Everett (Doubleday)
Headshot: A Novel, by Rita Bullwinkel (Viking)
Mice 1961, by Stacey Levine (Verse Chorus Press)
The Unicorn Woman, by Gayl Jones (Beacon Press)

Drama
**Purpose**, by Branden Jacobs-Jenkins
Oh, Mary!, by Cole Escola
The Ally, by Itamar Moses

History
**Combee: Harriet Tubman, the Combahee River Raid, and Black Freedom During the Civil War**, by Edda L. Fields-Black (Oxford University Press)
**Native Nations: A Millennium in North America**, by Kathleen DuVal (Random House)
Plantation Goods: A Material History of American Slavery, by Seth Rockman (University of Chicago Press)

Biography
**Every Living Thing: The Great and Deadly Race to Know All Life**, by Jason Roberts (Random House)
John Lewis: A Life, by David Greenberg (Simon & Schuster)
The World She Edited: Katharine S. White at The New Yorker, by Amy Reading (Mariner Books)

Memoir or Autobiography
**Feeding Ghosts: A Graphic Memoir**, by Tessa Hulls (MCD)
Fi: A Memoir of My Son, by Alexandra Fuller (Grove Press)
I Heard Her Call My Name: A Memoir of Transition, by Lucy Sante (Penguin Press)

Poetry
**New and Selected Poems**, by Marie Howe (W. W. Norton & Company)
An Authentic Life, by Jennifer Chang (Copper Canyon Press)
Bluff: Poems, by Danez Smith (Graywolf Press)

General Nonfiction
**To the Success of Our Hopeless Cause: The Many Lives of the Soviet Dissident Movement**, by Benjamin Nathans (Princeton University Press)
I Am on the Hit List: A Journalist’s Murder and the Rise of Autocracy in India, by Rollo Romig (Penguin Books)
Until I Find You: Disappeared Children and Coercive Adoptions in Guatemala, by Rachel Nolan (Harvard University Press)

Music
**Sky Islands**, by Susie Ibarra
Jim is Still Crowing, by Jalalu-Kalvert Nelson
The Comet, by George Lewis
