= Jason Roberts (author) =

American author

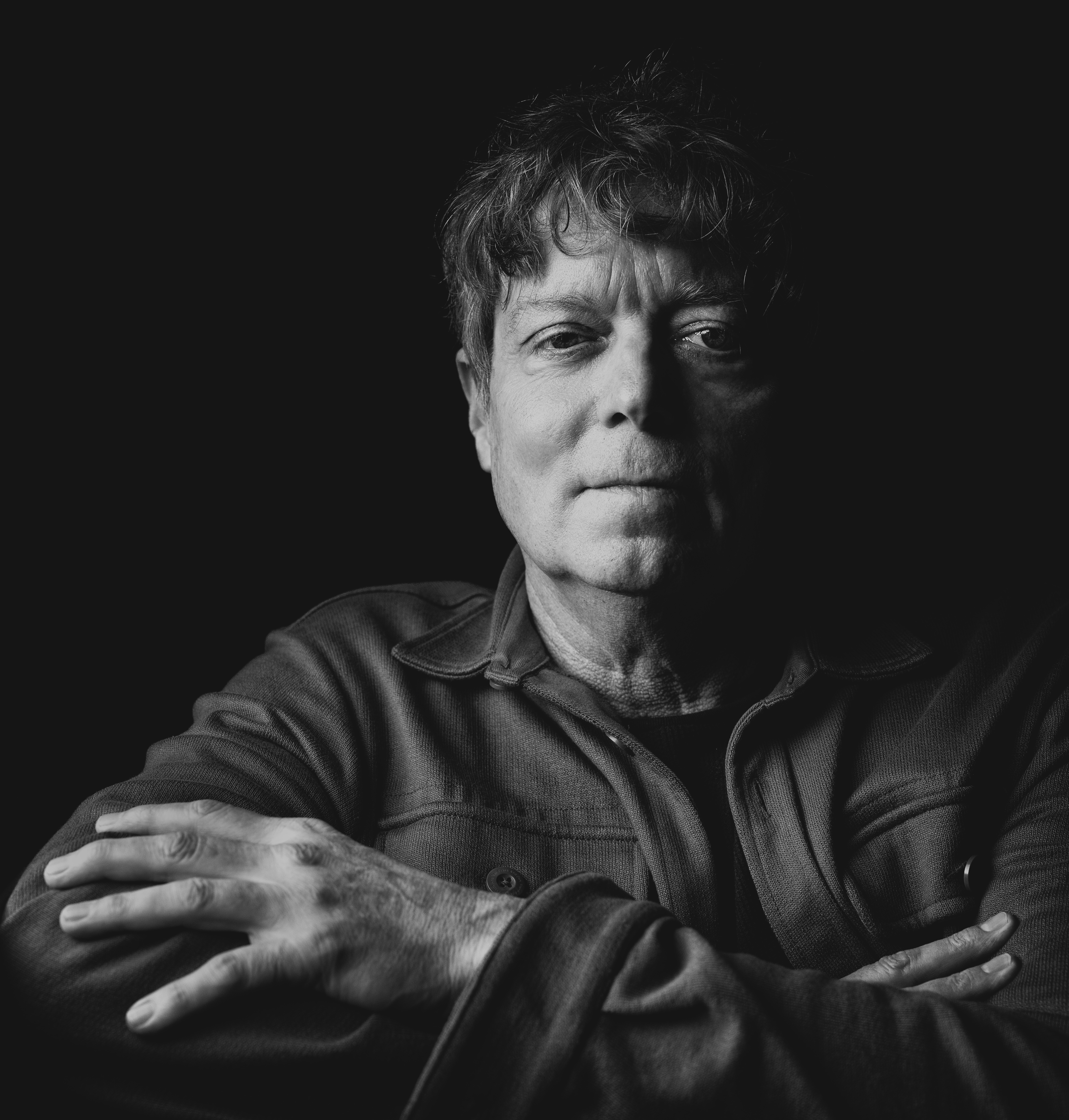
- Born: California
- Occupation: Writer
- Partner: Julia Scott
- Relatives: Anthony K. Roberts (father), Gloria Neil (mother)
- Writing career
- Period: 1997–present
- Genres: nonfiction, fiction
- Notable works: Every Living Thing, A Sense of the World
- Notable awards: Pulitzer Prize, PEN America Literary Award, Van Zorn Prize, National Book Critics Circle (finalist), Guardian First Book Award (longlisted)
- Website: jasonroberts.net

Jason Roberts is an American author of nonfiction and fiction. A former journalist and technologist, his writings have garnered multiple honors, including the Pulitzer Prize for Biography and the PEN America Literary Award.

== Early life ==
The son of actor/photographer Anthony Kalani Roberts and the actress Gloria Neil, Roberts was a self-described "child of the counterculture—my youth was fairly nomadic, split between California, Hawaii, and the back seat of a Volkswagen bus." He left high school at the age of fourteen, then spent six years working a variety of jobs (day laborer, dishwasher, late-night disc jockey) prior to enrolling at the University of California, Santa Cruz, where he received a degree in literature in 1989.

== Career ==
Santa Cruz’s proximity to Silicon Valley led Roberts to develop an interest in technology, and to teach himself computer programming. He worked as a software engineer at Apple Computer before leaving to write a series of books on both hardware and software topics, then to serve as a technology reporter for the Village Voice.

An early proponent of the Internet, in 1996 Roberts launched the Learn2 Corporation, one of the first sources for non-academic instruction on the Internet. In 1999, the company began publicly trading on the NASDAQ exchange; it has since been acquired by Oracle Corporation. In 2000, shortly after Yahoo! ranked Learn2 as “One of the Ten Most Important Websites of the 20th Century”, Roberts retired from management, citing a desire to return to writing.

While contributing to McSweeney's, The Believer, and other publications, Roberts was also (in 2004) named the inaugural winner of the Van Zorn Prize, awarded by Michael Chabon for the best short fiction exemplifying the tradition of Edgar Allan Poe.

== Every Living Thing ==
Every Living Thing: The Great and Deadly Race to Know All Life is a double biography, according to United States publisher Random House, “an epic, extraordinary account of rivalry and obsession in the quest to survey all of life on Earth,” tracing the parallel lives and careers of the 18th-century naturalists Carl Linnaeus and George-Louis de Buffon. The work won the 2025 Pulitzer Prize in the category of Biography.

== A Sense of the World ==
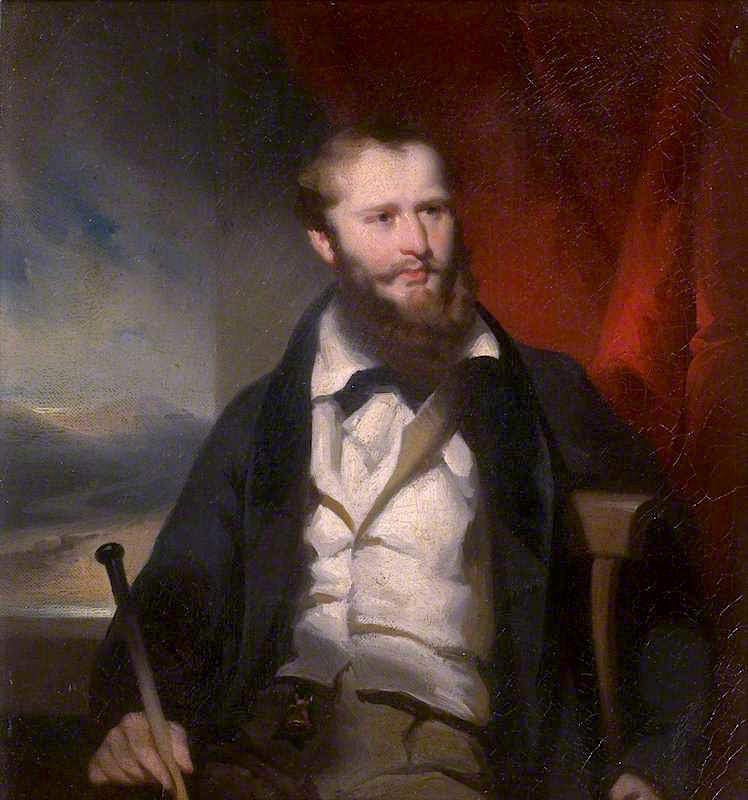
James Holman, in an 1830 Royal Society portrait by George Chinnery painted in Canton (modern-day Guangzhou). From A Sense of the World.

A Sense of the World: How a Blind Man became History's Greatest Traveler is the first biography of James Holman (1786–1857), the blind Englishman who overcame illness and adversity to become a world traveler and cultural commentator. It was published in the United States by HarperCollins, and in the United Kingdom by Simon & Schuster.

It was a finalist for the 2006 National Book Critics Circle Award, and longlisted for the Guardian First Book Award.

A Sense of the World was named a "Best Book of the Year" by the Washington Post, San Francisco Chronicle, Kirkus Reviews, St. Louis Post-Dispatch, and the Rocky Mountain News. According to critic Lev Grossman of Time magazine:

A Sense of the World is inspiring--but in the real way, the way most "inspirational" books aren't. Holman wasn't a Fear Factor thrill seeker; he was a deeply Romantic figure, a man ransacking the globe for peace of mind even as he fled the demons of disappointment and bitterness nipping at his heels. A celebrity in his time, Holman subsided after his death into the darkness in which he lived. He, and readers everywhere, owes Roberts thanks for leading him back into the light.

== Other publications ==
Prior to his narrative nonfiction work, Roberts authored five books on object-oriented programming and other technical topics. He is the editor of The Learn2 Guide (Villard), as well as four titles in the bestselling 642 Books series (Chronicle Books), each collections of creative materials for writers.

== Personal life ==
Roberts lives in Oakland, California, in partnership with the journalist Julia Scott. He is a board member of the Community of Writers, and a frequent member of the teaching faculty there.
