= Anthony K. Roberts =

American photographer, actor (1939–2005)

Anthony Kalani Roberts
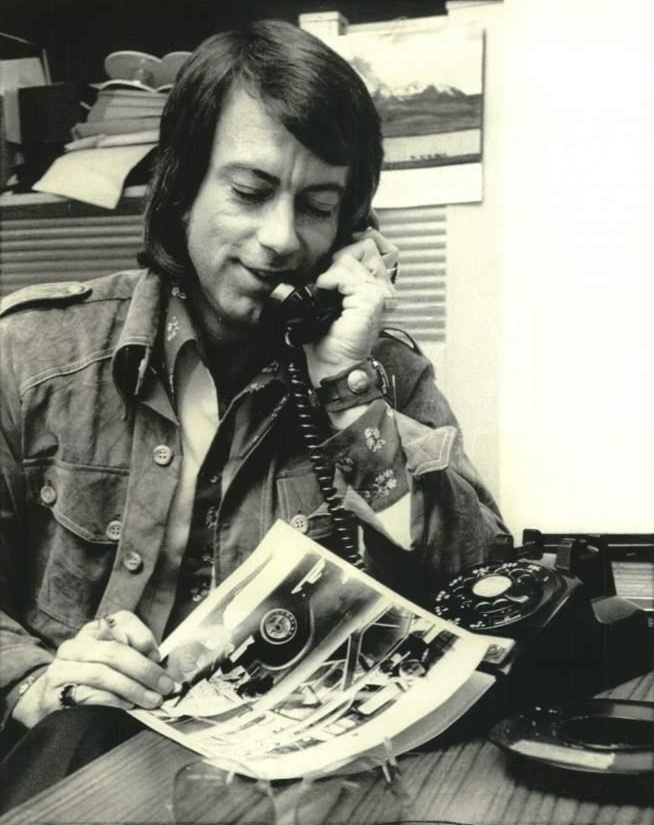
- Roberts in 1974
- Born: July 14, 1939; Honolulu, Territory of Hawaii
- Died: March 21, 2005 (aged 65); Phoenix, Arizona, United States
- Occupations: Photojournalism, actor
- Notable credit(s): Pulitzer Prize-winner, Sigma Delta Chi Award winner
- Spouse: Gloria Neil (m. 1960)
- Children: 2, including Jason Roberts

Anthony Kalani Roberts (July 14, 1939 – March 21, 2005), also known as Kal Roberts, was an American actor and photographer who won a Pulitzer Prize for photojournalism in 1974.

== Biography ==
Born into a Navy family in Honolulu, Hawaii, Roberts spent his teenage years in Southern California. There, his activities as a surfer and hot rod racer brought him to the attention of Hollywood, where his dark looks and natural athleticism won him work in commercials and as an advertising model. Yet his acting career stalled after a single film in 1965, only to be resumed 20 years later in character roles. In the interim he won considerable acclaim as a photographer, garnering the profession's top awards and producing both serious photojournalism and popular images of celebrities.

Long a fixture of the music and video scene in Nashville, Tennessee, he died of prostate cancer in Phoenix, Arizona at the age of 65.

== As an actor ==
Roberts was cast to type as a surfer in his film debut, credited as Tony Roberts, playing the role of "Brad" in The Beach Girls and the Monster. In post-production Roberts' dialogue was hurriedly overdubbed by another actor, obliterating the distinctive baritone that would become a hallmark of later performances. Roberts was inactive as a performer for the next twenty years, working instead as a photographer.

In 1986, when commissioned to take still photographs of the remake of the 1939 John Wayne film, Stagecoach, Roberts was recruited by director Ted Post to play the role of the outlaw Hank Plummer. The mature Roberts now projected a persona evocative of the Old West, with an imposing beard and patriarchal demeanor. He went on to play a similar role in the Johnny Cash and Kris Kristofferson vehicle, The Last Days of Frank and Jesse James, and in several music videos.

== As photojournalist ==
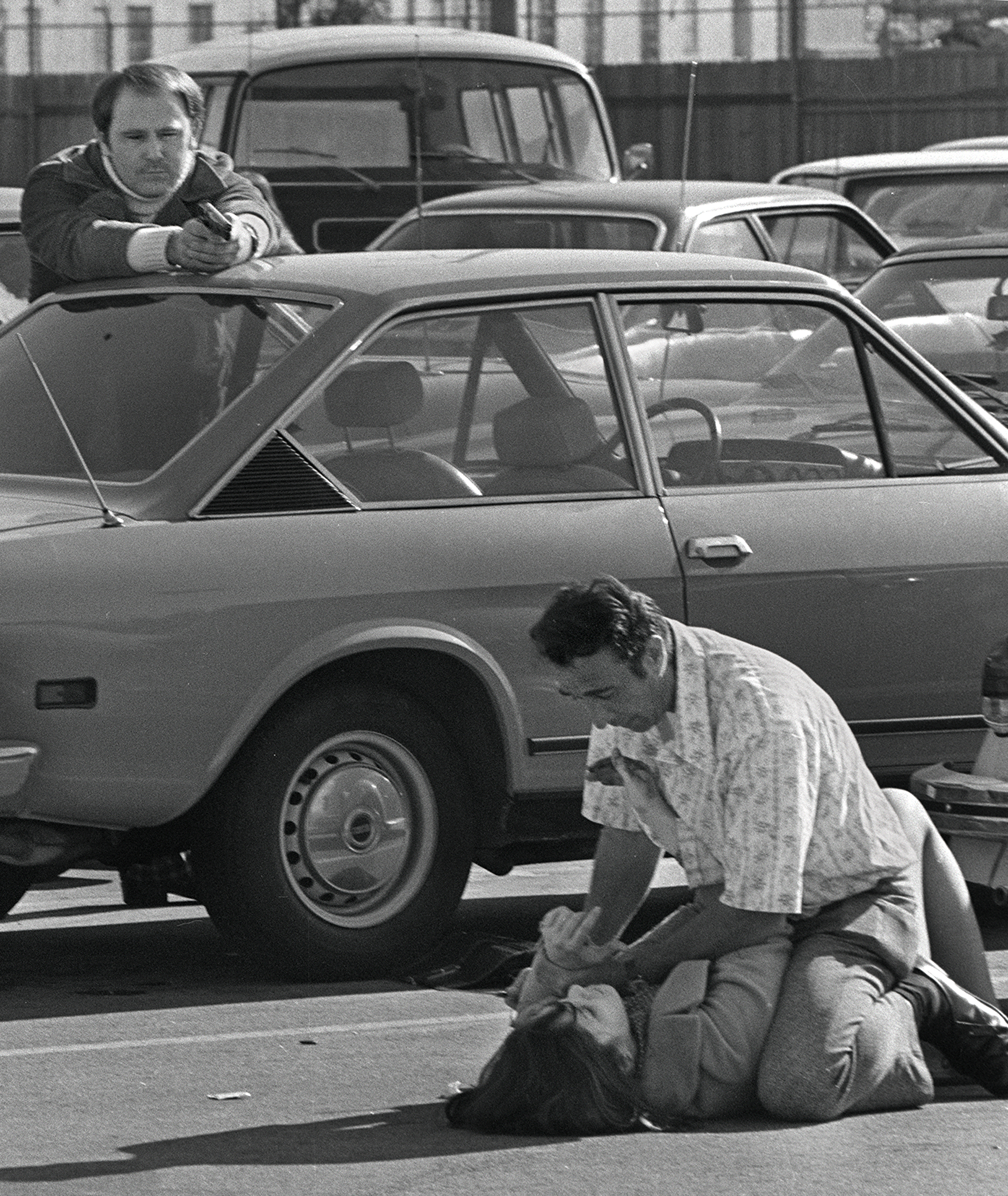
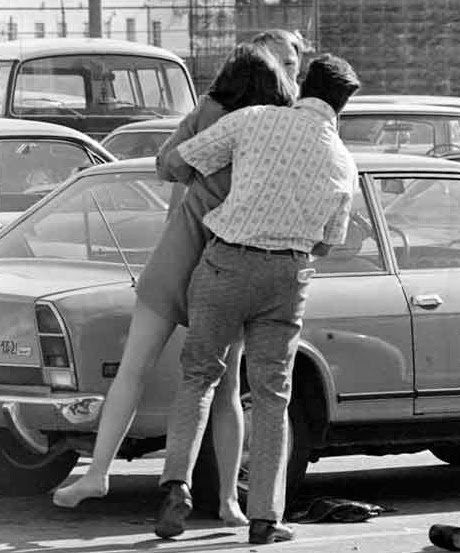
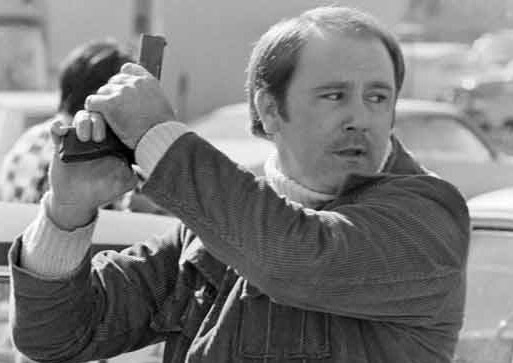
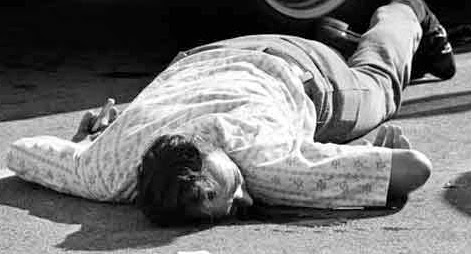
Roberts's Pulitzer Prize-winning series of photographs, "Fatal Hollywood Drama"

Taking up freelance photography as a profession, Roberts was carrying his camera in 1973 when he encountered a man attempting to abduct a woman from a Hollywood parking lot in broad daylight. Brandishing and clicking the camera in an attempt to deter the assailant, he captured the struggle and subsequent fatal shooting of the attacker by a security guard. The resulting series of pictures ran in the following day's Los Angeles Times, and were carried by the Associated Press, which nominated them for the 1974 Pulitzer Prize for Spot News Photography. The series, entitled "Fatal Hollywood Drama" won not only the Pulitzer but the Sigma Delta Chi Award, given by the Society of Professional Journalists.

== As commercial photographer ==
Moving to Nashville in the 1980s, Roberts opened Studio 333, a downtown photography studio that also doubled as a casual venue for informal concerts. His work included album covers and other promotional photographs for Johnny Cash, Waylon Jennings, Kris Kristofferson, Tanya Tucker, among others. He was honored by the Country Music Association as a notable industry contributor upon his death in 2005.

== Family ==
Roberts was married to Gloria Neil, his co-star on The Beach Girls and the Monster, from 1960 until his death. Their daughter Moana Roberts, also a photographer, took on the duty of official archivist of his work, including a since disbanded website. Their son, Jason Roberts, is a writer of fiction and nonfiction.
