= New York Press Photographers Association =

Photojournalists' association

The New York Press Photographers Association is an association of photojournalists who work for news organizations in the print and electronic media based within a seventy-five mile radius of Manhattan. The organization was founded in 1913 and has over 250 active members.

It sponsors an annual awards contest and publishes the New York Press Photographer, an annual electronic book displaying winning work from the contest. It publishes an electronic magazine N.Y. Photographers Today, a New York Press Photographer Publication displaying the images of the day in NYC https://magazine.nyppa.org/

== Officers and trustees ==
=== Officers (2025–2027) ===
- Bruce Cotler (President) – Photojournalist-independent
- Debra L. Rothenberg (Vice President) – Photojournalist-independent
- Marc A. Hermann (Secretary) – Photojournalist-independent
- William Perlman (Treasurer) – Newsday

=== Board of trustees (2025–2027) ===
- Jennifer Altman – Photojournalist-independent
- Dennis Clark – Photojournalist-independent
- Kevin Downs – Photojournalist-independent
- Mark Dye – Photojournalist-independent
- Thomas A. Ferrara – Newsday
- Gary Hershorn – Photojournalist-independent
- Richard Lee – Photojournalist-independent
- Todd Maisel – Photojournalist-independent
- Curtis Means – Photojournalist-independent
- Lloyd Mitchell – Photojournalist-independent

=== Officers (2023–2025) ===
- Bruce Cotler (President) – Photojournalist-independent
- Debra L. Rothenberg (Vice President) – Photojournalist-independent
- Marc A. Hermann (Secretary) – Photojournalist-independent
- William Perlman (Treasurer) – Newsday

=== Board of trustees (2023–2025) ===
- Jennifer Altman – Photojournalist-independent
- Porter Binks – Photojournalist-independent
- Dennis Clark – Photojournalist-independent
- Kevin Downs – Photojournalist-independent
- Mark Dye – Photojournalist-independent
- Thomas A. Ferrara – Newsday
- Gary Hershorn – Photojournalist-independent
- Richard Lee – Photojournalist-independent
- Todd Maisel – Photojournalist-independent
- Curtis Means – Photojournalist-independent

=== Officers (2021–2023) ===
- Bruce Cotler (President) – Photojournalist-independent
- Debra L. Rothenberg (Vice President) – Photojournalist-independent
- Marc A. Hermann (Secretary) – Photojournalist-independent
- William Perlman (Treasurer) – Newsday

=== Board of trustees (2021–2023) ===
- Jennifer Altman – Photojournalist-independent
- Porter Binks – Photojournalist-independent
- Dennis Clark – Photojournalist-independent
- Kevin Downs – Photojournalist-independent
- Mark Dye – Photojournalist-independent
- Thomas A. Ferrara – Newsday
- Gary Hershorn – Photojournalist-independent
- Richard Lee – Photojournalist-independent
- Todd Maisel – Photojournalist-independent
- Curtis Means – Photojournalist-independent

=== Officers (2019–2021) ===
- Bruce Cotler (President) – Photojournalist-independent
- Todd Maisel (Vice President) – Photojournalist-independent
- Marc A. Hermann (Secretary) – Photojournalist-independent
- William Perlman (Treasurer) – Newsday

=== Board of trustees (2019–2021) ===
- Jennifer Altman – Photojournalist-independent
- Porter Binks – Photojournalist-independent
- Kevin Downs – Photojournalist-independent
- Mark Dye – Photojournalist-independent
- Thomas A. Ferrara – Newsday
- David Handschuh – Photojournalist-independent
- Gary Hershorn – Photojournalist-independent
- Richard Lee – Photojournalist-independent
- Curtis Means – Photojournalist-independent
- Debra L. Rothenberg – Photojournalist-independent

=== Officers (2017–2019) ===
- Bruce Cotler (President) – Photojournalist-independent
- Todd Maisel (Vice President) – Photojournalist-independent
- Marc A. Hermann (Secretary) – Photojournalist-independent
- William Perlman (Treasurer) – Newsday

=== Board of trustees (2017–2019) ===
- Jennifer Altman – Photojournalist-independent
- Porter Binks – Photojournalist-independent
- Mark Dye – Photojournalist-independent
- Thomas A. Ferrara – Newsday
- David Handschuh – Photojournalist-independent
- Gary Hershorn – Photojournalist-independent
- Richard Lee – Photojournalist-independent
- Debra Rothenberg – Photojournalist-independent
- Robert Sabo – Photojournalist-independent
- Dennis Van Tine – Photojournalist-independent

=== Past presidents ===
- David Pokress – Photojournalist-Independent 2011-2015
- Ray Stubblebine – Photojournalist-Independent 2005-2011
- Bernie Nunez – Photojournalist-Independent 2003-2005
- Joe DeMaria – New York Post 1999-2003
- Susan Watts – New York Daily News 1997-1999
- Bill Turnbull – New York Daily News 1995-1997

=== Emeritus board of trustees ===
- Joseph DeMaria – V&P News Service
- Bill Turnbull – New York Daily News (Retired)
- Richard Drew – Associated Press
- Ray Stubblebine – Independent – Reuters

== NYPPA Photographers of the Year (1996–present) ==
- 1996: John Keating – Newsday
- 1997: Susan Watts – New York Daily News
- 1998: Todd Maisel – New York Daily News
- 1999: Gerald Herbert – New York Daily News
- 2000: Evy Mages – New York Daily News
- 2001: Vincent LaForet – The New York Times
- 2002: Aristide Economopoulos – The Star-Ledger
- 2003: Aristide Economopoulos – The Star-Ledger
- 2004: Michael Appleton – New York Daily News
- 2005: Ron Antonelli – New York Daily News
- 2006: Mario Tama – Getty Images
- 2007: Moises Saman – Newsday
- 2008: Aristide Economopoulos – The Star-Ledger
- 2009: Jennifer Brown – The Star-Ledger
- 2010: David Goldman – Associated Press
- 2011: Aristide Economopoulos – The Star-Ledger
- 2012: Aristide Economopoulos – The Star-Ledger
- 2013: David Goldman – Associated Press
- 2014: Kirsten Luce – Independent
- 2015: James Keivom – New York Daily News
- 2016: Aristide Economopoulos – NJ Advance Media
- 2017: David Goldman – Associated Press
- 2018: Aristide Economopoulos – NJ Advance Media
- 2019: Thomas A. Ferrara – Newsday
- 2020: Aristide Economopoulos – NJ Advance Media
- 2021: David Goldman – Associated Press
- 2022: Adam Gray – SWNS
- 2023: Alex Kent - Independent
- 2024: Adam Gray – Independent
- 2025: Julia Demaree Nikhinson – Associated Press

== NYPPA Anthony J. Causi Sports Photographer of the Year (2015–present) ==
- 2015: Al Bello – Getty Images – Sports Photographer of the Year
- 2016: Al Bello – Getty Images – Sports Photographer of the Year
- 2017: Al Bello – Getty Images – Sports Photographer of the Year
- 2019: Brad Penner – Independent for USA Today Sports – Sports Photographer of the Year
- 2020: Brad Penner – Independent for USA Today Sports – Sports Photographer of the Year
- 2021: Michael Stobe – Independent for Getty Images – Sports Photographer of the Year
- 2022: Robert Sabo – Independent for New York Post
- 2023: Robert Sabo – Independent for New York Post
- 2024: Al Bello - Getty Images
- 2025: Al Bello - Getty Images Sports Photographer of the Year

== NYPPA Best in Show (1972–present) ==
- 1972: (B/W) – Ed Adams – Time Magazine
- 1972:
- 1973:
- 1974:
- 1975:
- 1976:
- 1977:
- 1978:
- 1979
- 1980:
- 1981:
- 1982:
- 1983:
- 1984:
- 1985:
- 1986:
- 1987:
- 1988:
- 1989: (B/W)
- 1989: (Color)
- 1990: (B/W) – Susan Farley – New York Newsday – "Vietnam Vet Dad Remembers"
- 1990: (Color)
- 1991: (B/W)
- 1991: (Color)
- 1992: (B/W)
- 1992: (Color)
- 1993: (B/W) – John Keating – Newsday – "Special Prom"
- 1993: (Color) – Steven Schmidt – Gannett Westchester – "The Nominee"
- 1994: (B/W)
- 1994: (Color)
- 1995: (B/W) – Gerald Herbert – New York Daily News – "Haiti – The Revolution Within"
- 1995: (Color) – Ron Frehm – Associated Press
- 1996: Jon Naso – New York Newsday – "Mourning the Rebbe"
- 1997: Susan Watts – Daily News – "Miriam"
- 1998: Audrey Tiernan – Newsday – "A Room With a View"
- 1999: Jim Estrin – The New York Times – "Gene Therapy- Keeping Jacob Alive"
- 2000: Steve Klaver – The Star- Ledger – "Double Murder Suicide"
- 2001: Bob Deutsch – USA Today – "What were they Thinking?"
- 2002: Jeff Christensen – Reuters – "People Looking out Windows of the WTC"
- 2003: Aristide Economopoulos – The Star-Ledger – "Daddys Girl"
- 2004: Spencer Platt – Getty Images – ""The Invasion Begins"
- 2005: Michael Appleton – New York Daily News – "Street Fight"
- 2006: Craig Warga – New York Daily News – "New Orleans Burning"
- 2007: Moises Saman – Newsday – "Presidential Elections in Haiti"
- 2008: Todd Maisel – New York Daily News – "First Blood"
- 2009: David Goldman – Independent – "Harlem reacts to Obamas Win"
- 2010: Hiroko Masuike – Independent – "Bernard Madoff"
- 2011: Aristide Economopoulos – The Star-Ledger – "Fight Break Up"
- 2012: Craig Ruttle – Independent – "Hail to the Chief"
- 2013: James Keivom – New York Daily News – "Hurricane Sandy"
- 2014: Al Bello – Getty Images – "Synchronized diving"
- 2015: James Keivom – New York Daily News – "Eric Garner Protests"
- 2016: David Goldman – Associated Press – "Baltimore Police Death Protest"
- 2017: Thomas A. Ferrara – Newsday – ''Doubly Devoted the Tardiff Twins'"
- 2018: Byron Smith – Independent – "We Can't Be Sure"
- 2019: Byron Smith – Independent – "Remembering Saheed"
- 2020: Craig Ruttle – Independent – 'Momentary Marathon'
- 2021: Al Bello – Getty Images – 'Pandemic Hug'
- 2022: Patrick T. Benic – UPI -"Man Tries to breakthrough Main Door of House Chambers"
- 2023: Alex Kent - Independent - "Restless Souls of Bucha"
- 2024: Gary Hershorn – Independent “Smoked Filled Summer in NYC”
- 2025: James Keivom – New York Post – Independent “Drug Epidemic in The Hub”

== Louis Liotta Lifetime Achievement Award ==
The Louis Liotta Lifetime Achievement Award is awarded for lifetime photography accomplishments.

- 1989: Herb Schwartz – CBS Network News Director of Photography
- 2001: Larry DeSantis – United Press International
- 2002: Martin Lederhandler – The Associated Press
- 2011: Charles Ruppmann – New York Daily News
- 2013: Jerry Engel – New York Post
- 2017: Ray Stubblebine – Reuters
- 2017: Richard Drew – The Associated Press
- 2018: William Turnbull – New York Daily News
- 2019: Susan Watts – New York Daily News
- 2021: Marilynn K. Yee – New York Times
- 2021: Kathy Willens – Associated Press
- 2022: Todd Maisel – New York Daily News

== New York Press Photographers Award of Merit ==
- 1993: David Dinkins – New York City Mayor
- 2010: Katherine Conits - Starwood Hotels – Director, Community Outreach
- 2014: Eric L. Adams – Brooklyn Borough President
- 2015: Chief Joseph Fox – New York City Police Department
- 2015: Chief James Leonard – New York City Fire Department
- 2015: Hon. Ydanis Rodriguez – New York City Councilman
- 2021: Elizabeth G. Pratt – Canon USA. Inc. - Director, Professional Client Development & Support
- 2024: Marc Levine - New York Mets Team Photographer
- 2025: Samer Nasser - Executive Director of the Press Credentials Office (PCO) at the Mayor's Office of Media and Entertainment (MOME).
- 2025: Carlos Nieves - Assistant Commissioner, Deputy Commissioner, Public Information New York City Police Department

== Good Guy and Good Gal Awards ==
The New York Press Photographers Association "Good Guy, Good Gal" Award Winners since 1952 when the award was originated.

- Edgar Alfonzo – NY Mets, 2002
- Roberto Alomar – NY Mets, 2003
- Walter Alston – Brooklyn Dodgers
- Ray Arcel – Boxing Trainer, 1991
- Tiki Barber – NY Giants
- Jesse Barfield – NY Yankees, 1991
- Yogi Berra – NY Yankees
- Al Bianchi – NY Knicks, 1989
- Ron Bloomberg – NY Yankees
- Mark Breland – Boxer, 2002
- Dave Brown – NY Giants, 1995
- Jim Burt – NY Giants, 1988
- Chris Chambliss – NY Yankees
- Frank Cashen – NY Mets
- Roy Campanella – Brooklyn Dodgers
- Lou Carnesecca – St Johns University Men's Basketball Coach, 1987
- Harry Carson – NY Giants
- Rick Cerrone – NY Yankees Public Relations, 1999
- Chris Childs – NY Knicks, 2000
- Wayne Chrebet – NY Jets, 1998
- John Cirillo – NY Knicks Public Relations, 1992
- Kyle Clifton – NY Jets, 1991
- Greg Comella – NY Giants, 2002
- David Cone – NY Mets, 1992
- David Cone – NY Yankees 2000
- Angel Cordero – Jockey, 1993
- Howard Cross – NY Giants, 1999
- Shannon Dalton-Forde NY Mets
- David Dinkins – New York City Mayor
- Charlie Dressen Brooklyn Dodgers
- Boomer Eaison – NY Jets, 1994
- Jumbo Elliot – NY Jets, 1999
- Weeb Ewbank – NY Jets
- Patrick Ewing – NY Knicks, 1995
- John Franco – NY Mets, 1996
- Joe Frazier – Boxer
- Jim Gallagher – Starwood Hotels
- Mike Gallego – NY Yankees, 1994
- Arturo Gatti – Boxer, 2003
- Frank Gifford – NY Giants
- Rod Gilbert – NY Rangers
- Bernard Gilkey NY Mets, 1998
- Joe Goldstein – Public Relations, 1989
- Doc Gooden – NY Mets, 1994
- Goose Gossage – NY Yankees
- Aaron Gryder – NYRA, 2002
- Ron Guidry – NY Yankees
- Steve Gutman – NY Jets President, 1998
- Keith Hamilton NY Giants, 2003
- Bill Hampton – NY Jets equipment manager
- Pat Hanlon – NY Giants Vice President Public Relations
- Bud Harrelson – NY Mets
- Keith Hernandez NY Mets, 1987
- Sonny Hight – Senior Vice President, Chief Security Officer, 2000
- Red Holzman – NY Knicks Head Coach
- Jay Horwitz – NY Mets Vice President, Public Relations, 1996
- Elston Howard – NY Yankees
- Gil Hodges – NY Mets
- Allan Houston – NY Knicks
- Todd Hundley – NY Mets, 1997
- Catfish Hunter NY Yankees
- Dave Jennings – NY Jets, 1988
- Derek Jeter – NY Yankees
- Howard Johnson NY Mets, 1990
- Phil Johnson – NY Giants, 1997
- Marvin Jones – NY Jets, 2001
- Sam Kanchuger – NYRA
- Jerry Koosman – NY Mets
- Rich Kotite – NY Jets, 1997
- Ed Kranepool – NY Mets
- Julie Krone – Jockey, 1990
- Bowie Kuhn – Major League Baseball Commissioner
- Sean Landeta – NY Giants, 1993
- Tommy Lasorda Brooklyn Dodgers
- Pat Leahy – NY Jets, 1992
- Fred LeBow – NY Road Runners, 1992
- Brian Leetch – NY Rangers
- Al Leiter – NY Mets
- Bob Lemon – NY Yankees
- Richard Levin – Major League Baseball, 2001
- Mo Lewis – NY Jets, 1995
- Lou Little – Columbia University Football Coach
- Rebecca Lobo – NY Liberty
- Al Lopez – NY Yankees
- Rick Lyle – NY Jets, 2002
- Sparky Lyle – NY Yankees
- Kevin Maas – NY Yankees, 1992
- Sal Maglie – Brooklyn Dodgers
- Bob Mandt – NY Mets, 1991
- Billy Martin – NY Yankees
- Tino Martinez – NY Yankees, 1998
- Hideki Matsui – NY Yankees
- Willie Mays – NY Giants
- Lee Mazzilli – NY Mets
- Kevin McCarthy NY Mets, 2001
- Joe McDonald – NY Mets
- Roger McDowell NY Mets, 1988
- Tug McGraw – NY Mets
- Freeman McNeil NY Jets
- Arthur Mercante Boxing Referee, 1998
- Gene Michael – NY Yankees
- Anne Mileo – NY Yankees PR Secretary, 1989
- Diane Nelson – Jockey, 1996
- Terry Neyocks – NYRA President/Chief Operations Officer, 2003
- Herb Norman – NY Mets Clubhouse Manager
- Bobby Nystrom – NY Islanders, 1998
- Bobby Ojeda – NY Mets, 1989
- Chris Olert – Con-Edison, 2011
- Paul O'Neil – NY Yankees, 2002
- Gabe Paul – New York Yankees General Manager
- Andy Pettitte – NY Yankees, 1997
- Mike Piazza – NY Mets, 2001
- Joe Pignatano – NY Mets
- Lou Piniella – NY Yankees
- Frank Ramos – NY Jets Public Relations, 1994
- Wilie Randolph – NY Yankees
- Randy Rasmussen – NY Jets
- Willis Reed – NY Knicks
- Pee Wee Reese – Brooklyn Dodgers
- Mickey Rendine – Yankee Clubhouse Manager, 1993
- Arthur Richman – NY Yankees, 1988
- Bobby Richardson – NY Yankees
- Dave Rigetti – NY Yankees, 1987
- Doc Rivers – NY Knicks, 1994
- Phil Rizzuto – NY Yankees
- Kyle Rote – NY Giants
- Andy Robustelli – NY Giants
- Nick Santagata – NYRA, 1994
- Steve Sax – NY Yankees, 1988
- Tom Seaver – NY Mets
- Charlie Segar – MLB
- Jason Sehorn – NY Giants, 1998
- Shirley Day Smith – NYRA, 1987
- Alfonso Soriano – NY Yankees, 2003
- Michael Spinks – Boxer, 1989
- Mike Stanton – NY Yankees, 2001
- John Starks – NY Knicks, 1997
- Casey Stengel – NY Yankees
- Mel Stottlemeyer – NY Yankees
- Craig Swan – NY Mets
- Danny Tartabull – NY Yankees, 1993
- Vinnie Testaverdi – NY Jets, 2000
- Tim Teufel – NY Mets, 1991
- Wayne Tolleson – NY Yankees, 1988
- Amari Toomer – NY Giants, 2000
- Al Toon – NY Jets, 1993
- Jeff Torborg – NY Mets Manager, 1993
- Jim Turner – NY Jets
- Bobby Valentine – NY Mets Manager, 1998
- John Vanbiesbrouck – NY Rangers, 1992
- Herschel Walker – NY Giants, 1996
- Rube Walker – NY Mets
- Wesley Walker – NY Jets, 1987
- Joe Walton – NY Jets Head Coach, 1988
- Alex Webster – NY Giants
- Theresa Weatherspoon – NY Liberty, 2002
- Turk Wendell – NY Mets, 2000
- Sonny Werblin – NY Knicks
- Roy White – NY Yankees
- Bernie Williams – NY Yankees, 1996
- Jason Williams – NJ Nets, 2000
- Dave Winfield – NY Yankees
- Fred Wilpon – NY Mets, Owner, 1994
- Dick Young – Sports Writer
- Joel Youngblood – NY Mets
- Nick Zito – Horse Trainer, 1992
