= Julia Scott =

Canadian-American writer and journalist

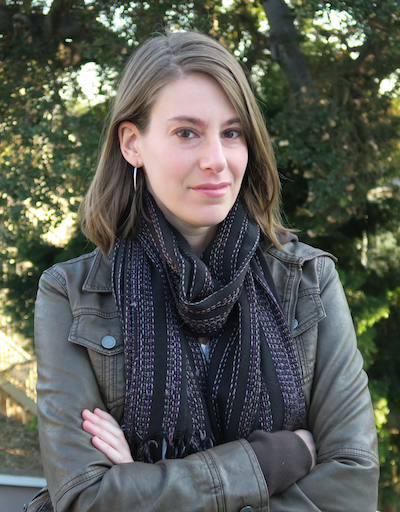
- Born: Montreal, Quebec
- Occupation: Writer/journalist
- Partner: Jason Roberts
- Writing career
- Period: 2000 - present
- Genres: print, radio
- Website: juliascott.net

Julia Scott is a Canadian-American writer and journalist, known primarily for her work in print and audio. She is a contributor to both The New York Times and The New York Times Magazine, as well as National Public Radio, American Public Media, Salon, Nautilus, and Maclean's.

Scott is the senior producer of Your Undivided Attention, the podcast of the Center for Humane Technology and part of the TED Audio Collective. She was senior producer and lead creative of Inside Voice: My Obsession with How We Sound by Lake Bell, a Pushkin audiobook that Vanity Fair praised as "A sweeping excavation of voice and what it reveals about who we are.”. Additionally, Scott was senior producer of Murderville, Texas, a 2023 investigative podcast from The Intercept, which won a National Headliner Award in the criminal justice category, and was named an honoree in the 2023 Webby Awards.

"Bon Voyage", Scott's 2012 radio documentary for the BBC World Service, was praised by The Guardian as "a vivid, beautifully told story of a couple facing terminal illness" and broadcast internationally, winning the Excellence in Journalism Award from the NLGJA and becoming a finalist for the Radio Academy Award. Her audio documentary "Under One Roof" aired on CBC's "The Current" on April 16, 2020.

== Other works ==
Scott is the editor of the anthology Drivel: Deliciously Bad Writing by Your Favorite Authors (Perigee Books, 2014), cited as "classic" by Vanity Fair and featuring contributions by Dave Eggers, Gillian Flynn, Mary Roach, Rick Moody and Chuck Palahniuk, among others.

== In popular media ==
Scott is the subject of "Julia", an episode in the Heavyweight podcast series by Jonathan Goldstein, named "One of the 10 Best Podcast Episodes of 2016" by Elle magazine.

== Personal life ==
A native of Montreal, Scott maintains dual Canadian and American citizenship. She currently resides in Oakland, California. Her partner is the author Jason Roberts.

== Honors ==
- Notable Selection, The Best American Essays (2019 edition), 2020
- Finalist, Radio Academy Award, 2013
- Excellence in Journalism Award, NLGJA, 2013
- Special Citation, Knight Risser Prize for Western Environmental Journalism, 2011
- The Best American Science Writing (for "Pesticides Indicted in Bee Deaths"), 2010
- Scripps Howard Fellowship for Environmental Studies, 2008
- Metcalf Institute for Environmental Reporting Fellowship, 2008

== See also ==
- Investigative journalism
