= Edda L. Fields-Black =

American historian and Pulitzer Prize winner

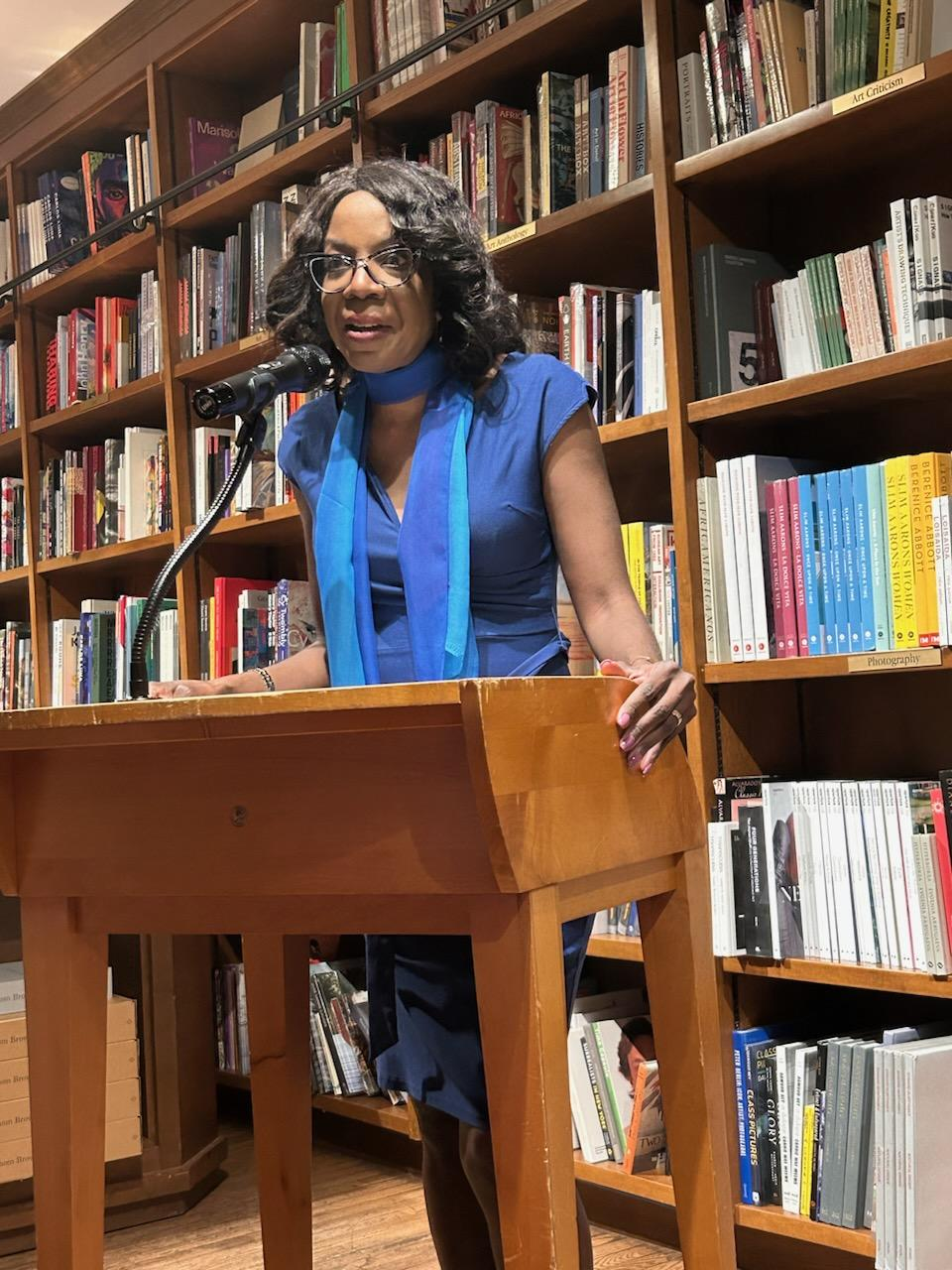
- Fields-Black in March 2024
- Born: Edda L. Fields; Miami, Florida, U.S.
- Occupations: Historian, Professor, Author
- Spouse: Samuel Black
- Awards: Pulitzer Prize for History (2025); Gilder Lehrman Lincoln Prize (2025); Tom Watson Brown Book Award (2025)

Academic background
- Education: Emory University (BA); University of Florida (MA); University of Pennsylvania (MA, PhD)
- Thesis: Rice farmers in the Rio Nunez region: A social history of agricultural technology and identity in coastal Guinea, ca. 2000 BCE to 1880 CE (2001)
- Doctoral advisor: Steven Feierman

Academic work
- Institutions: Carnegie Mellon University (2001–present)
- Main interests: West African rice agriculture and peasant rice farmers, Rio Nunez languages, slavery on antebellum rice plantations, African diaspora, Civil War history, Gullah history and culture
- Notable works: COMBEE: Harriet Tubman, the Combahee River Raid, and Black Freedom during the Civil War (2024); Deep Roots: Rice Farmers in West Africa and the African Diaspora (2008)
- Notable ideas: Rice cultivation technology transfer from West Africa to the Americas
- Website: eddafieldsblack.com

Edda L. Fields-Black is an American historian who is Professor of History and Director of the Dietrich College Humanities Center at Carnegie Mellon University. She won the 2025 Pulitzer Prize in History for her book COMBEE: Harriet Tubman, the Combahee River Raid, and Black Freedom during the Civil War. She is known for her transnational work on West African rice agriculture and societies, the African diaspora, and Gullah culture.

== Early life and education ==
Born in Miami, Fields-Black grew up with her parents, Eddie Fields (an attorney, sole practitioner, and entrepreneur) and Dr. Dorothy Jenkins Fields (a librarian and curriculum specialist turned archivist who founded the Black Archives History and Research Foundation of South Florida and the Black Archives Lyric Theater in Miami’s Overtown neighborhood).

Fields-Black is the great-granddaughter of immigrants and the granddaughter of migrants. Her maternal great-grandparents, Sam D. Johnson and Ida Ellen Johnson, immigrated from Harbour Island Bahamas first to Key West, Florida then to Miami and settled in Miami’s Overtown neighborhood near the turn of the 20th century. They worked as a sponger and gardener turned insurance salesman and a domestic, laundress, and seamstress, but were able to educate all seven of their children who worked their way and helped each other get through college, graduate and professional school, then returned to Miami to serve the African-American community as doctors, teachers, and judges. In the 1940's the family moved to the Brownsville neighborhood where Fields-Black was born and grew up surrounded by her maternal grandparents and her maternal grandmother’s brothers and sisters who all lived on the same block. Her grandmother, Dorothy Kathyrn Johnson Jenkins McKellar (b. 1909), whom she called "Nana," was a significant influence in her life.

Fields-Black’s paternal grandparents, Jim Fields and Mamie Frazier Fields, were Gullah speakers from Green Pond, South Carolina. They migrated when her father was young to Charleston, South Carolina, then Miami. The family settled first in the Liberty Square Housing Project, then the Opa-Locka neighborhood. Working as a plumber’s assistant and nurse's aid, they raised their children to be career military service men, a lawyer, teacher, nurse, and engineer. Fields-Black, her parents, and sister visited her paternal grandparents on the weekends. And, some of her fondest childhood memories were of visiting her paternal great grandmother, Anna Richards Frazier, and extended family in Green Pond every summer. Even as a child, she was curious about paternal kins’ peculiar speech patterns. This upbringing deeply influenced her research interests and commitment to documenting Gullah Geechee culture and history and its connections to West Africa. Fields-Black is a direct descendant of a formerly enslaved man, Hector Fields (her great great great-grandfather), who liberated himself from bondage in Beaufort County, enlisted in the 2nd South Carolina Volunteers in March 1863, and fought in the Combahee River Raid of June 1863.

Fields-Black graduated from Carrollton School of the Sacred Heart in Miami in 1989. She earned a BA degree in English and History from Emory University. After her undergraduate studies, she attended the University of Florida, where she earned an MA degree in History under the mentorship of R. Hunt Davis, who played a key role in building the university's African History program.

Fields-Black then pursued graduate studies at the University of Pennsylvania, earning both MA and PhD degrees in History. She completed her PhD in 2001 under the supervision of Steven Feierman, with her dissertation titled "Rice farmers in the Rio Nunez region: A social history of agricultural technology and identity in coastal Guinea, ca. 2000 BCE to 1880 CE." Her dissertation combined historical linguistics, oral narratives, European travelers' accounts, and biological and botanical studies of mangroves to reconstruct the earliest social and agricultural history of the Rio Nunez region, establishing a language classification and settlement chronology for the Coastal and Mel subgroups.

== Career ==
Fields-Black joined the faculty at Carnegie Mellon University in 2001 immediately after completing her PhD. She was promoted to Professor and appointed Director of the Dietrich College Humanities Center in July 2024, succeeding David Shumway. She also serves as Faculty Advisor for Carnegie Mellon's African and African American Studies Minor.

=== Research methodology ===
Throughout her career, Fields-Black has used new sources, often interdisciplinary methodologies, to reconstruct the history of people from West Africa and the African Diaspora (peasant rice farmers in precolonial West Africa and enslaved laborers on antebellum Lowcountry rice plantations) who did not author written sources and have otherwise been omitted from the historical record. Fields-Black's research methodology combines historical linguistics, environmental history, ethnographic fieldwork, and archival research. She conducted fieldwork in West Africa from 1992-1998, including initial research in Sierra Leone (1992, 1994, 1996) and 12 months of intensive fieldwork in Guinea (1996-1998). She lived in coastal villages in the Rio Nunez region, studying rice cultivation among the Baga and Nalu ethnic groups. She has conducted fieldwork in the South Carolina Lowcountry since 2014.

Her approach prioritizes community-centered research and long-term relationship building. Traveling to Sierra Leone and learning Krio helped her to communicate with her great-grandmother in her ancestral language (Gullah), demonstrating her commitment to cultural preservation and community engagement.

In 2014, Fields-Black began collaborating with museum curators. She was the consultant for "The Rice Fields of the Lowcountry," a permanent exhibition in the "Power of Place" gallery at the Smithsonian National Museum of African American History and Culture, an adviser for the "From Slavery to Freedom" permanent exhibition for the Senator John Heinz History Center, and a consultant for the International African American Museum in Charleston, South Carolina, for the West African Roots, Carolina Gold and Gullah Geechee permanent exhibits. As of 2025, she is part of the Lowcountry Advisory Group, for an upcoming exhibit on Gullah Geechee people, language, culture, and history at the Smithsonian Museum of American History initiated by Fath Davis Ruffins.

Fields-Black coined the approach of "taking history off the shelf and putting it on stage" to describe using the arts and storytelling to make history accessible to a broader audience. Her work with artists, museum curators, and scientists also transformed how Fields-Black writes history.

=== Collaboration with John Wineglass ===
Fields-Black executive produced and wrote the libretto (interpreting in an artistic voice primary sources, many of which she previously wrote about in her academic research) for "Unburied, Unmourned, Unmarked: Requiem for Rice," a contemporary classical symphonic work about slavery on rice plantations. Composed by John Wineglass, the piece premiered at Carnegie Music Hall in Pittsburgh (2019) and has been performed by the New York Philharmonic at Lincoln Center (2023).

== Major works ==
=== COMBEE (2024) ===
COMBEE: Harriet Tubman, the Combahee River Raid, and Black Freedom during the Civil War (Oxford University Press, 2024) won the 2025 Pulitzer Prize in History. Based on analysis of over 175 U.S. Civil War Pension Files and previously unexamined documents, the book reconstructs the lives of historical actors among the 756 enslaved people who freed themselves during the June 2, 1863 Combahee River Raid. The book represents the fullest account to date of Harriet Tubman's Civil War service.

The book has received the 2025 Pulitzer Prize for History (shared with Kathleen DuVal), the Gilder Lehrman Lincoln Prize (2025), the Tom Watson Brown Book Award (2025), the George C. Rogers Jr. Award (2024, South Carolina Historical Society), the 2024 Marsha M. Greenlee History Award. It was also shortlisted for the Mark Lynton History Prize (2025), and the 2025 ASALH Book Prize, and received an Honorable Mention by the James A. Rawley Prize (2025). The Wall Street Journal calling it "groundbreaking" and The New Yorker naming it among "The Best Books We've Read This Week."

COMBEE inspired "Picturing Freedom: Harriet Tubman, the Combahee River Raid, and Black Freedom during the Civil War" art exhibit, which opened at the Gibbes Museum of Art in Charleston, SC in May 2024. Curated by Vanessa Thaxton Ward (Director of the Hampton University Museum), "Picturing Freedom" features aerial photographs of the Combahee River and rice fields by J Henry Fair and artwork by African American masters who have been inspired by Harriet Tubman.

=== Deep Roots (2008) ===
Deep Roots: Rice Farmers in West Africa and the African Diaspora (Indiana University Press, 2008; paperback 2014) chronicles the development of tidal rice-growing technology by West African Rice Coast inhabitants. It was the first study to apply comparative historical linguistics to Atlantic languages of West Africa's coast, combining linguistic evidence, biological and botanical studies, oral traditions, and travelers' accounts.

=== Rice: Global Networks and New Histories (2015) ===
Co-edited with Francesca Bray, Peter A. Coclanis, and Dagmar Schäfer, Rice: Global Networks and New Histories (Cambridge University Press, 2015) received the Choice Outstanding Academic Title Award for 2015. The book represents the first step toward a global and comparative history of rice and its place in capitalism.

=== Research on Gullah ===
Apart from her research on rice agriculture in coastal Guinea and Sierra Leone, Fields-Black has also performed research on the Gullah Geechee people, the Trans-Atlantic slave trade, Creolization, and other topics in the history of the African Diaspora.

Fields-Black is also known for her work on the Rio Nunez languages, Nalu language, Mel languages, and other Atlantic languages of West Africa.

=== Research on rice ===
Fields-Black serves as Principal Investigator for "'Queen Rice': How Enslaved Labor Transformed Wetland Landscapes and America," a collaborative 300-year study examining enslaved labor's impact on coastal wetlands and historic rice fields' resiliency in the face of climate change and sea level rise. The interdisciplinary project combines archaeology, conservation, digital humanities, historical analysis, pollen studies, soil science, and wildlife ecology.

== Publications ==
=== Books ===
- Fields-Black, Edda L. COMBEE: Harriet Tubman, the Combahee River Raid, and Black Freedom during the Civil War. New York: Oxford University Press, 2024. ISBN 978-0197552797
- Fields-Black, Edda L. Deep Roots: Rice Farmers in West Africa and the African Diaspora. (Blacks in the Diaspora.) Bloomington: Indiana University Press, 2008. ISBN 978-0253351470
- Bray, Francesca, Peter A. Coclanis, Edda L. Fields-Black, and Dagmar Schäfer. Editors. Rice: Global Networks and New Histories. New York: Cambridge University Press, 2015. ISBN 978-1107044395

=== Selected articles ===
- Fields-Black, Edda L. "Before 'Baga': Settlement Chronologies of the Coastal Rio Nunez Region, Earliest Times to c.1000 CE." The International Journal of African Historical Studies 37, no. 2 (2004): 229-253.
- Fields-Black, Edda L. "Rice and Rice Farmers in the Upper Guinea Coast and Environmental History." History Compass 6, no. 3 (2008): 784-806.

=== Op-eds ===
- "Black Families Can Now Recover More of their Lost Histories." The New York Times, February 2024.
- "Actually, Secretary Hegseth, Harriet Tubman was a war hero." The Washington Post, July 2024.

== Awards and honors ==
- 2025 Pulitzer Prize for History (shared)
- 2025 Gilder Lehrman Lincoln Prize
- 2025 Tom Watson Brown Book Award
- 2024 George C. Rogers Jr. Award
- 2024 Marsha M. Greenlee History Award
- 2016 Carrollton Spirit of Sophie Alumnae Award
- 2015 Choice Outstanding Academic Title Award (for Rice: Global Networks and New Histories)

== Affiliations ==
- Director, Dietrich College Humanities Center, Carnegie Mellon University (2024–present)
- Advisor, Smithsonian National Museum of American History
- Advisor, Smithsonian National Museum of African American History and Culture
- Advisor, International African American Museum

== Personal life ==
She is married to Samuel Black, a historian, curator, and archivist who is director of the African-American Program at the Senator John Heinz History Center. They have two children. The pair was featured together in an episode of StoryCorps in 2006; Samuel talks to Edda Fields-Black about his relationships with his father and work throughout the episode, which aired on NPR's Morning Edition. Fields-Black is a breast cancer survivor.

== See also ==
- Rio Nunez languages
- Mel languages
- Oryza glaberrima
- Gullah language
- Combahee River Raid
