= Sue Casey =

American actress (1926–2019)

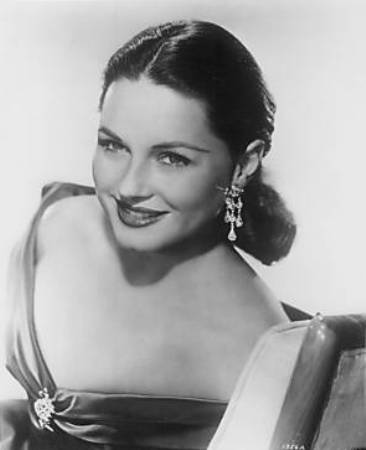
- Casey in 1956
- Born: Suzanne Marguerite Philips; April 8, 1926; Los Angeles, California, U.S.
- Died: February 21, 2019 (aged 92); Los Angeles, California, U.S.
- Occupation: Actress
- Years active: 1946–2002
- Spouse: Johnny Durant
- Children: 4

Sue Casey (born Suzanne Marguerite Philips; April 8, 1926 – February 21, 2019) was an American actress and Hollywood extra who appeared in over 85 productions between 1945 and 2002.

== Early life and career ==
Casey was born in Los Angeles to Burke and Mildred Philips. A talent agent noticed her while she was in high school, and began interviewing her at studios. Still a teenager, now known as Sue Casey, she appeared in her first film, Holiday in Mexico (1945). Some of her more famous films include The Secret Life of Walter Mitty (1947), Neptune's Daughter (1949), Annie Get Your Gun (1950), Show Boat (1951), Rear Window (1954), Breakfast at Tiffany's (1961), Camelot (1967) and Paint Your Wagon (1969). Casey appeared in two Academy Award for Best Picture winners: An American in Paris (1951) and American Beauty (1999).

On television in 1962, she appeared on Gunsmoke as “Martha” in S8E10’s “The Hunger”. She also appeared in Season 3 Episode 9 as Mrs. Calvada opposite Sheldon Leonard on the Dick Van Dyke Show (1963). She had a lead guest role on Family Affair (1969). Casey also appeared in a season five episode of Boy Meets World (1997).

Casey was also a model and in the late 1950s she temporarily transitioned from films to television commercials so she could spend more time with her family. She appeared in over 200 commercials including ads for Chrysler, Maxwell House and Kelloggs. To fans of 1960s B-movie "beach party cinema," Casey is known as the female lead in the 1965 cult classic The Beach Girls and the Monster, which Casey described as "one of the worst movies ever made", and the notorious 1968 film, Catalina Caper. Her last role was on television in 2002.

In the 1960s, Casey obtained a real estate broker's license and sold properties in Beverly Hills.

== Personal life and death ==
In 1950, she married Johnny Durant. Casey's husband was in the United States Navy, then became a film editor. They had four children.

Casey died on February 21, 2019 at the age of 92.

== Selected filmography ==
- Holiday in Mexico (1946) - Girl (uncredited)
- The Secret Life of Walter Mitty (1947) - Goldwyn Girl (uncredited)
- Words and Music (1948) - Showgirl (uncredited)
- Blondie's Big Deal (1949) - Woman Watching Demonstration (uncredited)
- Make Believe Ballroom (1949) - Carhop (uncredited)
- Neptune's Daughter (1949) - Model (uncredited)
- The Great Sinner (1949) - Pretty Girl (uncredited)
- It's a Great Feeling (1949) - Model (uncredited)
- Nancy Goes to Rio (1950) - Woman Backstage (uncredited)
- The Yellow Cab Man (1950) - Minor role (uncredited)
- The Daughter of Rosie O'Grady (1950) - Pretty Girl (uncredited)
- Annie Get Your Gun (1950) - Cowgirl (uncredited)
- The Flame and the Arrow (1950) - Angela (uncredited)
- A Life of Her Own (1950) - (uncredited)
- Mrs. O'Malley and Mr. Malone (1950) - Girl (uncredited)
- For Heaven's Sake (1950) - Nurse (uncredited)
- The Scarf (1951) - Miss Dean (uncredited)
- Secrets of Monte Carlo (1951) - Wife of Rajah
- Show Boat (1951) - New Year's Eve Cutie (uncredited)
- An American in Paris (1951) - "Stairway to Paradise" Dancer (uncredited)
- Here Comes the Groom (1951) - Bridesmaid (uncredited)
- The Lady Says No (1951) - Minor Role (uncredited)
- My Favorite Spy (1951) - Pretty Girl (uncredited)
- The Las Vegas Story (1952) - Woman (uncredited)
- The Big Trees (1952) - Young Lady (uncredited)
- Meet Danny Wilson (1952) - Minor Role (uncredited)
- Aladdin and His Lamp (1952) - Dancing Girl (uncredited)
- Sound Off (1952) - Showgirl (uncredited)
- We're Not Married! (1952) - Girl in Hector's Daydream (uncredited)
- Son of Paleface (1952) - Saloon Dancer (uncredited)
- The Merry Widow (1952) - Girl at Maxim's (uncredited)
- Cattle Town (1952) - Girl with Mike (uncredited)
- Somebody Loves Me (1952) - Minor Role (uncredited)
- Road to Bali (1952) - Handmaiden (uncredited)
- Eight Iron Men (1952) - Girl in Daydream (uncredited)
- Million Dollar Mermaid (1952) - Swimmer (uncredited)
- The Band Wagon (1953) - Tall Girl in Arcade (uncredited)
- The French Line (1953) - Model (uncredited)
- Rear Window (1954) - Sunbather (uncredited)
- The Other Woman (1954)
- Deep in My Heart (1954) - Chorus Girl (uncredited)
- 3 Ring Circus (1954) - Circus Snake Charmer (uncredited)
- Son of Sinbad (1955) - Harem Girl (uncredited)
- Bells Are Ringing (1960) - Party Guest (uncredited)
- The Ladies Man (1961) - Bit Role (uncredited)
- Ada (1961) - Party Girl (uncredited)
- Breakfast at Tiffany's (1961) - Party Guest in Blue and Green Dress (uncredited)
- Billy Rose's Jumbo (1962) - Dottie (uncredited)
- Who's Got the Action? (1962) - Clint's Date (uncredited)
- A New Kind of Love (1963) - (uncredited)
- The Carpetbaggers (1964) - Secretary (uncredited)
- The Beach Girls and the Monster (1965) - Vicky Lindsay
- Swamp Country (1966) - Mrs. Cox
- Camelot (1967) - Lady Sybil
- Catalina Caper (1967) - Anne Duval
- Paint Your Wagon (1969) - Sarah Woodling
- Emergency! S5Ep9 - A mother of a child
- The Main Event (1979) - Brenda
- Evilspeak (1981) - Mrs. Caldwell
- Hysterical (1983) - Bookstore Society Lady #2
- Till the End of the Night (1995) - Rita Kesterling
- A Very Brady Sequel (1996) - Art Patron #1
- American Beauty (1999) - Sale House Woman #2
