= A Sense of the World =

2006 book by Jason Roberts

- Author: Jason Roberts
- Language: English
- Subject: James Holman
- Genre: Biography
- Publisher: Harper Collins
- Publication date: 2006
- Publication place: United States
- ISBN: 0-00-716106-9

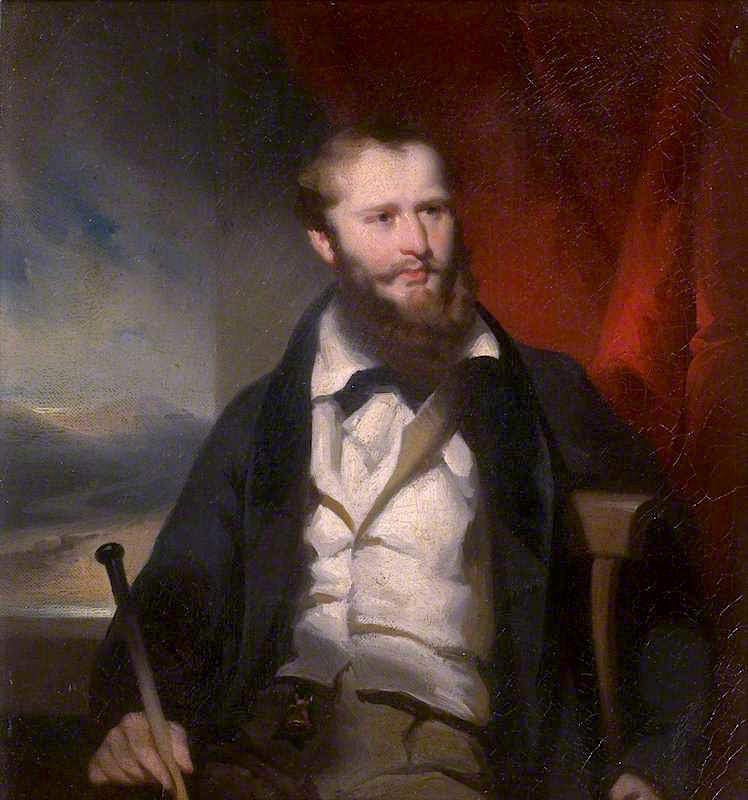
James Holman, in an 1830 Royal Society portrait by George Chinnery painted in Canton (modern-day Guangzhou). From A Sense of the World.

A Sense of the World: How a Blind Man became History's Greatest Traveler is a bestselling biography of James Holman (1786–1857), the blind Englishman who overcame the adversity of sightlessness to become a world traveler and cultural commentator. Its author is Jason Roberts.

The book was a finalist for the 2006 National Book Critics Circle Award, and for the international Guardian First Book Award. It was published in the United States by HarperCollins, and in the United Kingdom by Simon & Schuster. According to critic Lev Grossman of Time magazine:

A Sense of the World is inspiring--but in the real way, the way most "inspirational" books aren't. Holman wasn't a Fear Factor thrill seeker; he was a deeply Romantic figure, a man ransacking the globe for peace of mind even as he fled the demons of disappointment and bitterness nipping at his heels. A celebrity in his time, Holman subsided after his death into the darkness in which he lived. He, and readers everywhere, owes Roberts thanks for leading him back into the light.
