= Kathy Willens =

American photographer (1949–2024)

- Born: December 8, 1949; Detroit, Michigan, U.S.
- Died: July 16, 2024 (aged 74); New York City, New York, U.S.
- Occupations: Photographer, photojournalist
- Awards: Associated Press Managing Editors Award for Reportorial Excellence

Kathy Ann Willens (December 8, 1949 – July 16, 2024) was an American photographer and photojournalist. One of the first women photojournalists to work for the Associated Press, she shot more than 90,000 images during her 45-year career.

== Early life ==
Kathy Ann Willens was born on December 8, 1949, in Detroit, Michigan, to G. Lionel and Gertrude Willens. Her father owned a jewelry store and her mother was a dental hygienist. She had two older brothers, Alan Rush Willens (born 1936) and John Stuart Willens (born 1939) She grew up in Farmington Hills, Michigan, and her father was an avid photo hobbyist who kept a darkroom.

After graduating from college, Willens got her first job at a suburban Detroit tabloid, Spinal Column. She earned $5 for every photo it of hers which it ran.

She moved to Miami, Florida, after a few months, after getting a lead on a photography lab technician job with the Miami News newspaper. She won a job as a full-time staff photographer after an older employee retired. There were just two other female photographers working for newspapers in Florida that she knew of, Mary Lou Foy at the Miami Herald and Ursula Seemann at the Ft. Lauderdale Sun Sentinel. The rest of her colleagues in Florida were men, middle-aged and older.

Willens later said there were high expectations for women photojournalists. She also worked constantly. When it was a slow news day, her editor required her to photograph women on the beach. "It was women's lib, and I thought it was unacceptable to ask me to do that," she said. So she photographed a woman in a bikini, had the image blown up to poster size, tacked it to the wall of her office, and told everyone that it was the last such picture she would take.

== Associated Press ==
A Miami-based photo editor for the Associated Press was impressed with her work. When an AP photojournalist retired, Willens became their replacement.

Three of her most iconic images came in 1977. She shot tennis player Billie Jean King on April 2, 1977, during her win over Kerry Melville Reid at the Family Circle Cup Tennis Classic. King liked the photo so much that it became the cover of King's 2021 autobiography, All In. Willens also photographed Queen Elizabeth II's state visit to the Bahamas in October, and world heavyweight champion boxer Muhammad Ali training at the 5th Street Gym in Miami Beach in December. It was the first time she had covered Ali, as he was near the end of his career. (During his heyday, the AP always sent more senior staff.)

Willens extensively covered the Mariel boatlift, when 1,700 private boats brought nearly 125,000 Cubans to the United States between April and October 1980. Her photograph of a Miami tugboat overloaded with Cuban refugees became another of her best-known images.

She tried to cover the first night of the 1980 McDuffie Riots, three days of race riots in Miami that followed the acquittal of four white police officers in the beating death of Arthur McDuffie. "I couldn't leave the office to photograph, the phone was ringing all night long and I answered it," she said. "I reached out to J. Scott Applewhite, then a freelancer, who went out to photograph for AP." She photographed images of its aftermath instead. Her image of a dejected man wandering through ruined buildings became a defining image of the riots.

In the mid-1980s, Willens went to El Salvador and photographed the civil war there. She also covered the Nicaraguan community in the U.S., and the Iran–Contra affair.

Willens covered Ronald Reagan's 1980 presidential campaign, and George H. W. Bush's 1988 presidential effort. She photographed Bush the day after the election surf fishing in Maine. It became a definitive image of Bush.

In 1993, Willens transferred to the AP's New York City bureau. She was sent to Somalia in 1993 to cover the civil war there. It was a dangerous assignment. On July 12, three weeks after Willens returned to the U.S., AP photographer Hansi Kraus and three others — Reuters photographer Dan Eldon, sound man Anthony Macharia, and photographer Hosea Maina — were killed by a mob in Mogadishu. Kraus had replaced Willens. His death struck her hard, and she resolved to stay in the U.S. to shoot more news and sports.

Willens became best known for her sports photography. For much of her career, she was the only woman photojournalist on the field. She covered 11 Super Bowls, six Olympic Games, and numerous playoff and championship games for the National Basketball Association, Major League Baseball, and other sports. She began covering sports at the Miami News because her then-boyfriend was a sports report and gave her news tips. She studied the work of fellow Miami AP photojournalist Phillip K. Sandlin to learn what constituted a good shot and how to edit images.

"For me," said later said, "sports has the ability to capture these moments of extreme emotion. The joy of it, it's right there in front of you all the time. It's so omnipresent and compacted into a short period of time."

== Awards, exhibitions, and teaching ==
Willens won numerous awards. She received the Associated Press Managing Editors Award for Reportorial Excellence, and was honored several times by both the National Baseball Hall of Fame and Museum and Pro Football Hall of Fame in their yearly photo competitions. When she retired, the New York Press Photographers Association gave her the Louis Liotta Lifetime Achievement Award.

Stories and events that were big and ongoing were the most attractive things for Willens to document with her photography. She was particularly drawn to Hurricane Andrew and the plight of Cuban and Haitian immigrants. Her photographs of immigrants were exhibited at the Historical Museum of Southern Florida in 2004. She also worked for eight months on a series of images of mothers serving prison sentences in New York state. In 2021, she began a documentary photography project about students at a high school for educationally disadvantaged childre, but never completed it.

For several years, Willens was an adjunct professor of photojournalism at New York University.

== Style ==
Aside from Sandlin, Willens cited war photographer Susan Meiselas, portraitist Annie Leibovitz, and street photographer Helen Levitt as significant influences.

Willens was known for shooting lots of images, out of which a few would be excellent. She admitted to shooting perhaps as many as 250 photographs, out of which just four or five might match her standards for a high-quality shot. However, she earned a reputation among photojournalists and news editors for consistently coming up with a defining image of the people and events she covered.

== Retirement and death ==
Willens retired in 2021. The New York Yankees professional baseball team honored her during a pregame ceremony in which manager Aaron Boone presented her with a framed print signed by pitcher David Cone. Willens had shot the image of Cone celebrating after pitching a perfect game in 1999.

Shortly after her retirement, Willens was diagnosed with ovarian cancer. She died of the disease at her home in Brooklyn, on July 16, 2024, at the age of 74. The Yankees honored Willens with a moment of silence before their game on July 20.
