= Combee: Harriet Tubman, the Combahee River Raid, and Black Freedom During the Civil War =

2024 book by Edda L. Fields-Black

Combee: Harriet Tubman, the Combahee River Raid, and Black Freedom during the Civil War
- Cover
- Author: Edda L. Fields-Black
- Language: English
- Subject: American Civil War, Harriet Tubman, Slavery in the United States, African-American history, Combahee River Raid
- Genre: History
- Publisher: Oxford University Press
- Publication date: 2024
- Publication place: United States
- Media type: Print (hardback), e-book, audiobook
- Awards: Pulitzer Prize for History (2025); Gilder Lehrman Lincoln Prize (2025); Tom Watson Brown Book Award (2025); George C. Rogers Jr. Award (2024); Marsha M. Greenlee History Award (2024)
- ISBN: 978-0-19-755279-7 (Print)
- Preceded by: Rice: Global Networks and New Histories (2015)

Combee: Harriet Tubman, the Combahee River Raid, and Black Freedom During the Civil War is a 2024 book by American historian Edda L. Fields-Black published by Oxford University Press. Fields-Black documents Harriet Tubman's service during the American Civil War, particularly her role in the June 1–2, 1863, Combahee River Raid, a Union military operation that freed 756 enslaved people from rice plantations in South Carolina's Lowcountry. Fields-Black, descendant of a raid participant, draws on over 175 U.S. Civil War pension files to reconstruct the experiences of enslaved individuals who were freed in the raid and trace the emergence of Gullah Geechee culture. The book won the 2025 Pulitzer Prize for History (which it shared with Kathleen DuVal's Native Nations: A Millennium in North America), the Gilder Lehrman Lincoln Prize (2025), the Tom Watson Brown Book Award (2025), the George C. Rogers Jr. Award (2024), and the Marsha M. Greenlee History Award (2024).

== Background ==
Fields-Black, herself a descendant of raid participant Hector Fields, uses pension files to identify previously unnamed individuals who fought in and were liberated in the Combahee River Raid. With the US Civil War Pension Files, Fields-Black allows the Combahee freedom seekers to tell their stories "in their own words and in their own voices". The book shows that the US Civil War Pension files are a third primary source (in addition to slave narratives and WPA interviews), which historians can use to hear formerly enslaved people speak of their experiences during slavery. And, these US Civil Pension Files contain information that can connect enslaved people in the documents of Southern slaveholders to freed people listed in the 1870 census. The 90,000 US Colored Troops who were granted pensions have today millions of descendants, like Fields-Black. Thus, Fields-Black's book is an example of how the US Civil War Pension Files can help millions of descendants of slaves identify their enslaved ancestors and historians of slavery and of the Civil War to rewrite history from the perspective of enslaved people and their pursuit of freedom.

In addition to the pension files, Fields-Black uses planters' records (marriage settlements, wills, estate records, bills of sale, mortgages, and compensation claims to the Confederate government) and post-Civil War land records to support the Combahee freedom seekers' pension file testimony and tell the stories of their lives before, during, and after the raid. Recovering these slave transactions, the book opens up the antebellum history of Beaufort and Colleton County (records of both counties were burned during the Civil War) and contributes new perspectives in slavery, Civil War, African American, and the US South historiographies.

In a 2021 interview on Defense One Radio, Fields-Black explained that her research for this book originated in her longstanding academic focus on the transnational history of West African rice farming in precolonial West Africa's Upper Guinea Coast and antebellum South Carolina and Georgia Lowcountry. She became interested in the Combahee River Raid when she discovered that the plantations affected by the operation were rice plantations. Then, she realized Tubman played a role in the raid and the Civil War was the least-known chapter of Harriet Tubman's legendary life. Fields-Black emphasized Harriet Tubman's role not only as a military leader but also as a recruiter, organizer, and intelligence operative working closely with the Union Army and formerly enslaved people. Using new sources, the book offers the most detailed account of Harriet Tubman’s Civil War service to date. The book plays an important role in the preservation of Harriet Tubman’s legacy. Since its publication and based in part on the evidence it presents, Governor of Maryland Wes Moore commissioned Harriet Tubman Brigadier General of the Maryland National Guard on Veteran’s Day 2024. And, the US Army General Counsel issued a ruling that Tubman was and should be honored as a Union Civil War soldier.

== Summary ==
Fields-Black traces Harriet Tubman's Civil War service, focusing on her role in the June 1–2, 1863 Combahee River Raid, which liberated 756 enslaved people from bondage on seven rice plantations in South Carolina's Lowcountry. Drawing on over 175 U.S. Civil War pension files and other primary sources, the book reconstructs the lives of enslaved individuals who were liberated in the raid before, during, and after this military operation.

The work is organized into four parts across nineteen chapters. Part One establishes the historical context of rice cultivation in the Lowcountry, detailing the lives of enslaved workers who developed a distinct community identity as "Combee" people. Fields-Black traces both the planter families and their enslaved laborers, documenting the harsh conditions of rice production where mortality rates were twice those of cotton plantations.

Part Two examines Tubman's arrival in Beaufort in 1862 and her intelligence-gathering activities for the Union Army. The author details how Tubman interviewed refugees, recruited spies, scouts and river pilots, and gathered strategic information about Confederate positions, while also establishing enterprises where refugees could earn wages. Fields-Black emphasizes the contributions of formerly enslaved people whose local knowledge proved crucial to Union military operations.

Part Three provides a detailed account of the Combahee River Raid itself. Led by Colonel James Montgomery and guided by Tubman and her network of spies, scouts, and river pilots, the 2nd South Carolina Volunteers, and 3rd Rhode Island Heavy Artillery conducted what Fields-Black characterizes as "the largest and most successful slave revolt in US history". The narrative reconstructs the raid through military records, contemporary newspapers, and pension testimonies.

Part Four documents how 150 of the freed men immediately enlisted in the Union Army and follows the raid's participants through subsequent military campaigns and into Reconstruction. Fields-Black traces the establishment of African American communities in the postwar period, including the development of Gullah Geechee culture.

== Reviews ==
In his review for The New Yorker, Casey Cep praised Fields-Black's staging of the "dramatic scene" of the Combahee River Raid "with all its danger, grace, and tragedy". Cep contends the raid should be "celebrated as a revolutionary act in the history of Black liberation". The reviewer points out how the author "powerfully situates the abolitionist among her contemporaries" in the broader network of Black liberation rather than isolating Tubman as "singular". Through the US Civil War Pension files, Cep asserts, the book reveals the inner workings of the enslaved community along the Combahee River and the exploitation of the enslaved peoples labor to grow rice for slave holders who reaped enormous profits, laying the foundation for today's Gullah Geechee culture. Cep also stressed the expansive scope, which gives equal attention to Tubman's compatriots, the Combahee freedom seekers liberated during the raid, "[reconstituting] an entire society" through more than seven hundred pages that "rescue neglected lives".

In his review for BookPage, Alden Mudge described Fields-Black's book as a detailed and meticulously researched account of the Combahee River Raid. While noting that the book's length and depth may not appeal to all readers–he likens it to "the painstaking process of an archaeological dig"–he praised Fields-Black's careful reconstruction of the 1863 military operation led by Harriet Tubman and executed by Black Union soldiers. Mudge emphasized the author's "passion for factual depth and precision" and highlighted her use of diverse archival sources to recover the identities and stories of individuals previously omitted from the historical record. He also noted the book's broader insights into the South Carolina rice economy, Tubman's military role, and the technological knowledge of enslaved Africans, calling the work both "revelatory" and "profoundly important".

Damian Shiels focused on Fields-Black's methodological innovations, like her use of US Civil War pension files, which he calls "the key to unlocking the 'Combee' story", reconstructing the lives of enslaved people "in exceptionally rich detail". Shiels believed that the book succeeds in naming previously unidentified people, describing the book as "in many ways about naming, as it 'uncovers the identities of people who were heretofore not identified'". Shiels contended Fields-Black’s book is "a benchmark" and he hoped "an inspiration" to other historians to utilize "this remarkable resource". He praised the author's ability to weave together the narratives of the Combee people and the environmental, social, and political factors impacting their lived experiences with broader historical figures, like Harriet Tubman, and events.

In a review for The Civil War Monitor, Gordon Berg called Fields-Black's book a rare and powerful work a "transcendant, once-in-a- generation historical exploration" that combines detailed historical research with personal and cultural insight. He underscores Fields-Black's portrayal of the Combahee River Raid as not just a military action but a transformative moment for the hundreds of enslaved people who gained their freedom. Drawing from fragmented sources—including wills, pension files, and compensation claims—Fields-Black reconstructs individual lives that had long been omitted from the historical record. Berg also notes the book's "insightful, anthropological investigation of a deeply-rooted way of life" in the South Carolina Lowcountry dependent on the exploitation of enslaved labor and its broader reflections on resistance, community, and identity of the enslaved people liberated in the raid. The inclusion of photographs, archival documents, and extensive appendices, he writes, strengthens the book’s emotional and historical weight.

In Library Journal, Amy Lewontin described the book as an "incredible", "distinctive", and meticulously researched account of Harriet Tubman's involvement in the 1863 Combahee River Raid. She drew attention to Fields-Black's use of a wide range of newly examined sources to document Tubman’s role as a Union Army operative who guided a military mission that freed nearly 800 enslaved people from South Carolina rice plantations. The review emphasized the book’s attention to both the strategic dimensions of the raid and the personal histories of those involved, including one of the author's ancestors.

In his review for Emerging Civil War, historian Rich Condon described the book as a "painstakingly researched" and "multilayered" study of the Combahee River Raid and its broader significance, an "extraordinary offering." Condon draws attention to the author's close study of rice plantation culture in the South Carolina Lowcountry and how it shaped the lives of both the enslaved and the enslavers. Rather than centering solely on Harriet Tubman, the book investigates the networks, histories, and choices of the people who sought freedom during the raid and beyond. Condon also remarked on the book's use of overlooked sources such as pension files and planter documents, which help bring individual stories to light with "captivating storytelling" and to connect the raid to longer arcs of community formation and resistance in today's Gullah Geechee Corridor.

Ousmane Power-Greene, writing in The Boston Globe, presented Combee as both a recovery project and a challenge to traditional Civil War narratives. Power-Greene wrote Fields-Black "rectifies this neglect by recounting the history of those Black people who played a meaningful, if overlooked, role in the Union victory" in her book. Rather than framing Harriet Tubman solely as a legendary figure, Fields-Black placed her within a broader collective of Black soldiers and freedom seekers, providing a "richly textured portrait of Black lives" previously ignored by the Civil War literature. Power-Greene stressed her effort to dismantle the myth of passive emancipation, showing instead how enslaved people, whom the reviewer characterized as "change-agents", acted decisively to claim their own freedom. The reviewer also pointed to the author's refusal to sideline Tubman's early challenges with the Union military and her insistence on portraying her as a defiant and politically engaged actor.

Erin Shearer characterized the work as a "detailed epic" addressing a significant gap in Tubman scholarship by studying "the least-studied aspect of her well-documented life"—her Civil War service. Shearer commended her innovative use of pension files as an underutilized source that provides "new insights" into the experiences of Tubman, Black Union soldiers, and self-emancipated people beyond what historians have written about slavery and enslaved peoples’ lives from the WPA interviews. She considered the book a work that demonstrates Tubman's Civil War story as an essential part of 180,000 Black soldiers' efforts to end the South’s "peculiar institution" and an essential part of Tubman's legacy, filling crucial gaps in understanding her heroic contributions beyond her Underground Railroad activities.

Geri Lipschultz was initially drawn to the book through Fields-Black's New York Times op-ed about digitized Civil War pension files, which the reviewer called a "treasure trove" of information. Fields-Black uses the underutilized sources to "restore the 'humanity' of those enslaved against their will". Lipschultz described the work as driven by "a need to recover and restore the missing voices that sing freedom through generations of both heroism and suffering," characterizing Fields-Black’s book as "something epic" and "a stunning artifact in and of itself". The reviewer highlighted the book's "prose reads like fiction", setting readers on "the edge of their seats" by the time the raid takes place towards the middle of the book. And, the emotional resonance of Fields-Black researching a history in which her own great-great-great grandfather played a role, gives the author a voice that speaks for "a history, a people, a family—and a self".

James Pekoll described the book as "a tour de force of historical discovery" and "an exceptional work of American history," noting its extensive cast of historical figures, dramatic storytelling, and significant findings. Pekoll highlighted Fields-Black's use of a wide range of sources, including letters and records from enslavers, to document the lives and society of enslaved people. Pekoll also remarked on the book's contribution to understanding the concept of freedom, describing it as a valuable account of service, sacrifice, and courage.

Janell Hobson described the work as a "definitive history" of one of the most successful Civil War operations. It makes "for a compelling, page-turning narrative" despite its daunting length of over seven hundred pages, aided by Fields-Black's clear storytelling and concise writing style. Hobson noted how the book maps out "the shared destiny of different enslaved African Americans who had little in common other than their desire for freedom", while highlighting linguistic and cultural differences between Tubman and the Gullah Geechee people. Hobson said that Fields-Black fills important gaps of "one of Tubman's most heroic stories, an essential part of her legacy", her Civil War service, which was "barely glimpsed in the movie biopic Harriet (2019)".

Fred Logan called the work a "masterpiece" addressing Black agency and described it as an urgent call to action rather than a conventional book review. He commended the author's unprecedented research for naming previously anonymous enslaved people involved in the Combahee River raid, which he noted "makes our nameless ancestors real people." Logan emphasized the book's timely contribution to resisting right-wing attempts to ban Black history from public venues and appreciated the author's openly partisan stance supporting Black struggle.

In her review, Tahirah J. Walker characterized the work as "a ring-shout of a book" and praised Fields-Black for creating "a monumental work" based on decades of dense research spanning multiple primary sources. She commended the author for providing rich portraits of individual freedom seekers and giving their stories "long-overdue breathing room," while also stressing the book's focus on cultural traditions, languages, and community bonds. Walker welcomed how Fields-Black honored "the variety of languages and rituals of the freedom seekers" and taught readers about the nuances of Creole languages and enduring West African traditions.

Bernard Powers Jr. described the work as "a work of prodigious scholarship" that would be "especially rewarding" for those interested in slavery, abolitionism, the Civil War, and African American genealogy. He praised Fields-Black's examination of cross-cultural encounters between diverse Black people in the Lowcountry, noting how the author showed that freed people "were reuniting with friends and family members previously sold away" during the Combahee Raid. Powers appreciated the author's nuanced approach to identity, particularly her caution about applying the term Gullah-Geechee to coastal residents of that era, showing how people maintained "highly localized identities," such as "Combee." While acknowledging the book's scholarly merit, he noted that Fields-Black's admiration for Tubman "sometimes leads to exaggerated praise" and suggested that certain mortality anecdotes "would be strengthened immensely by even a limited statistical analysis."

Eric Herschthal argued that Fields-Black had produced "what is undoubtedly the most authoritative account of this unheralded slave revolt" by utilizing an underutilized archive of pension files. He praised the author's commitment to recovering enslaved voices rather than dwelling on archival gaps, noting she "rolled up her sleeves, dove into the archive" to tell this story. Herschthal positioned the book as part of a larger effort to recognize the Civil War as a slave revolution, though he noted Fields-Black "does not spell out this larger significance" as fully as she might have.

In her review of the book for the Washington Post, Amanda Brickell Bellows described the work as telling "the rousing story of the Union army's Combahee river raid" through skillful use of pension files and planter records. She highlighted how Fields-Black "effectively weaves Tubman's impressive biography into the author's broader narrative" while recovering the lives of freedom seekers through multiple archival sources. Bellows emphasized the book's portrayal of the raid as both "an act of war" and "an act of creation" that allowed formerly enslaved people to build new lives through marriage, land acquisition, and citizenship.

== Awards ==
=== Won ===
- The Pulitzer Prize for History (2025)
- The Gilder Lehrman Lincoln Prize (2025)
- The Tom Watson Brown Book Award (2025)
- The George C. Rogers Jr. Award (2024)
- The Marsha M. Greenlee History Award (2024)

=== Finalist ===
- The Mark Lynton History Prize (2025)
- The Association for the Study of African American Life and History Book Prize (2025)

=== Honorable mentions ===
- The James A. Rawley Prize (2025)
