= David Greenberg (historian) =

American historian

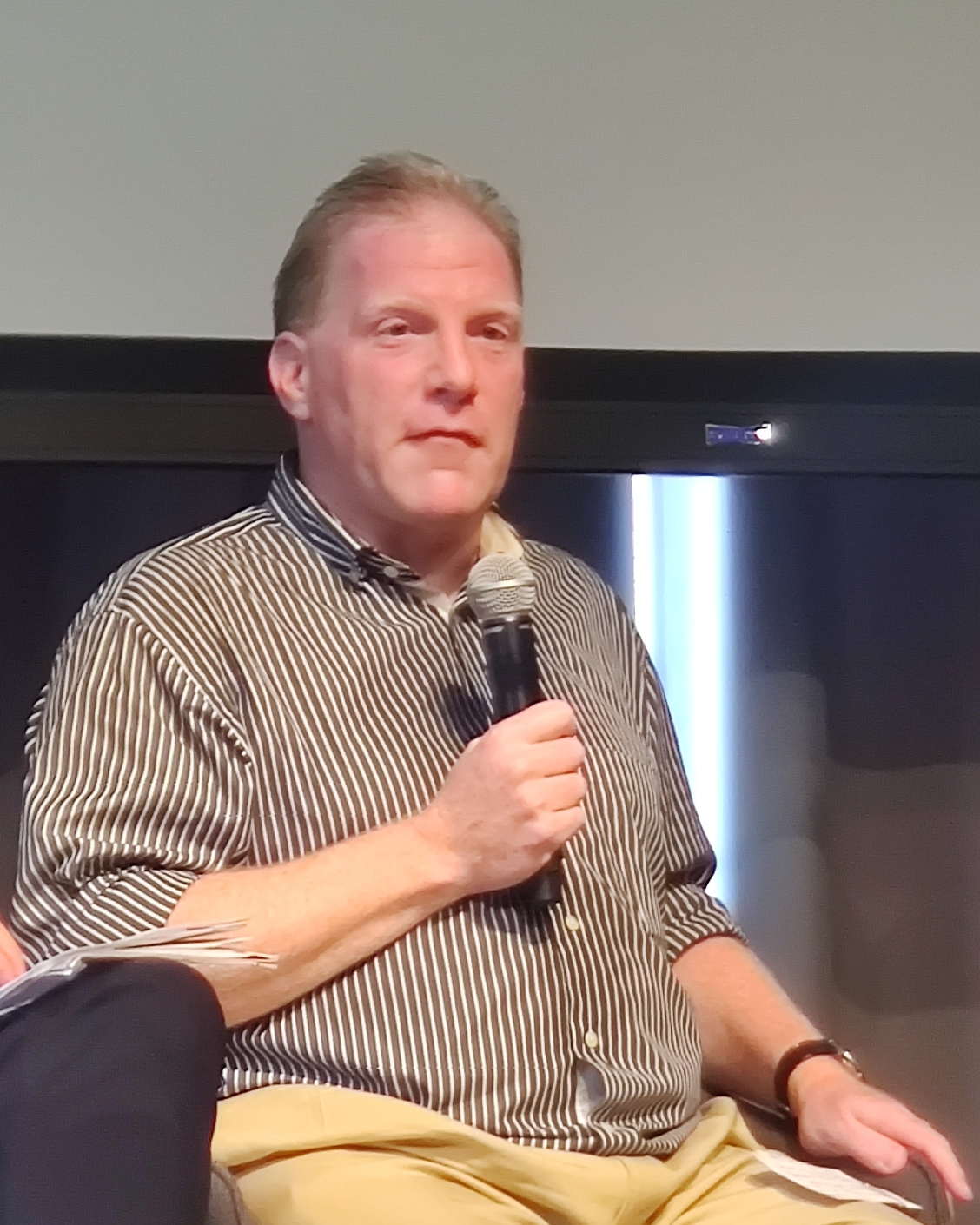
- Spouse: Suzanne Nossel

Academic background
- Education: Yale University (BA); Columbia University (MA, MPhil, PhD)
- Thesis: Nixon's Shadow: Democracy and Authenticity in Postwar American Political Culture (2001)

Academic work
- School or tradition: American political and cultural history
- Institutions: Rutgers University–New Brunswick
- Website: Official website

David Greenberg is an American historian and professor of US history as well as of journalism and media studies at Rutgers University-New Brunswick. He has been a frequent contributor to Slate since its inception and has also published articles in numerous well-known scholarly and popular outlets, including The New Yorker, The Atlantic, The Washington Post, The New York Times, Foreign Affairs, and others.

== US history books ==
Greenberg’s Ph.D. thesis won Columbia University’s 2001 Bancroft Dissertation Award, and became his first book, Nixon’s Shadow (2003), which won the Washington Monthly Annual Political Book Award and the American Journalism Historians Association's Book Award. Calvin Coolidge (2006), a biography in Henry Holt's American Presidents Series, appeared on the Washington Post’s list of best books of 2007. Presidential Doodles (2006) was widely reviewed and featured on CNN, NPR's All Things Considered, and CBS’s Sunday Morning. Republic of Spin (2016) examines the rise of the White House spin machine, from the Progressive Era to the present day, and the debates that Americans have waged over its implications for democracy. Alan Brinkley (2019) is a biography of the political historian. John Lewis: A Life (2024) is a biography of Rep. John Lewis, the congressman and civil rights leader.

== Journalism ==
Formerly a full-time journalist, Greenberg is now a contributing editor to Politico Magazine, where he writes a regular column. He previously served as managing editor and acting editor of The New Republic, where he was a contributing editor until 2014. Early in his career, he was the assistant to author Bob Woodward on The Agenda: Inside the Clinton White House (Simon & Schuster, 1994). He has also been a regular contributor to Slate since its founding and has written for The New Yorker, The Atlantic, The Washington Post, The New York Times, Foreign Affairs, Daedalus, Dissent, Raritan, and many other scholarly and popular publications. Greenberg was one of the earliest members of the Academic Freedom Alliance.

== Awards ==
His awards and honors include the Hiett Prize in 2008, given each year to a single junior scholar in the humanities whose work has had a public influence; a fellowship from the Woodrow Wilson International Center for Scholars; and the Rutgers University Board of Trustees Research Fellowship for Scholarly Excellence. In 2021-22 he was a fellow at the Cullman Center at the New York Public Library. He graduated from Yale University, summa cum laude and Phi Beta Kappa, and earned his PhD from Columbia University.

== Bibliography ==
- Nixon's Shadow: The History of an Image (W.W. Norton, 2003) ISBN 9780393048964, 9780393326161, 9780393285277
- Calvin Coolidge (Henry Holt / Times Books, 2006) ISBN 9780805069570
- Presidential Doodles: Two Centuries of Scribbles, Scratches, Squiggles, and Scrawls from the Oval Office squiggles & scrawls from the Oval Office (Basic Books, 2006) ISBN 9780465032662, 9780465032679, 9780465003624
- Republic of Spin: An Inside History of the American Presidency (W.W. Norton, 2016) ISBN 9780393067064, 9780393353648, 9780393285505, 9781531874315
- Alan Brinkley: A Life in History (Columbia University Press, 2019) ISBN 9780231187244, 9780231547161
- John Lewis: A Life (Simon & Schuster, 2024) ISBN 978-1982142995, 978-1982143015
