= Gloria Neil =

American television and film actress (born 1941)

- Born: Phoenix, Arizona, US
- Spouse(s): Anthony K. Roberts, 1960-2005

Gloria Neil is an American television and film actress. She is best known for her roles on The Man from U.N.C.L.E. and The Beverly Hillbillies, as well as the 1960s-era films The Beach Girls and the Monster and The Karate Killers.

== Early life ==
Born in Phoenix, Arizona, Neil moved to Palm Springs, California in her early childhood. Her initial recognition came as a beauty contest participant. After serving as a California runner-up in the 1958 Miss Universe competition and as the 1959 Junior Rose Bowl Queen, she worked as a model, ultimately coming to the attention of Universal Studios, which signed her to an acting contract in 1960.

== Career ==
Blonde, blue-eyed and petite, Neil made a reputation as an ingenue, notable for her ability to shift rapidly from a "girl next door" persona to that of a seductress. She was first cast in the role of the effervescent "Melvin" in The Lively Ones, a summer replacement comedy/variety show starring Vic Damone. The Lively Ones aired on NBC from July 26, 1962 to September 12, 1963, before giving up its slot to the comedy Hazel. The show received Emmy nominations as Outstanding Musical Program and for Outstanding Electronic Camerawork both seasons it aired. This was followed by a 1964 episode of The Dick Van Dyke Show in which she was cast as "Laura #2" alongside Mary Tyler Moore's Laura Petrie character and Rob Petrie, played by Dick Van Dyke.

Her film debut came in 1965, in the movie The Beach Girls and the Monster (subsequently also marketed as Monster from the Surf and Surf Terror). Later featured on the cover of the Psychotronic Video Guide and hailed as a campy "laugh riot with lots of bongos, murders and girls in bikinis", the low-budget film starred Jon Hall and featured a surf music soundtrack by Frank Sinatra, Jr. Playing the role of "Bunny", Neil was paired with her husband Anthony K. Roberts, a fellow actor who later achieved fame as a photojournalist.

Neil then returned to television in the hit show The Man From U.N.C.L.E., playing the role of Sarah, a beautiful-yet-brainy secret agent given to moments of whimsy. Although the actress Stefanie Powers was later tapped for a similar role in the spinoff series The Girl From U.N.C.L.E., Neil also appeared in The Karate Killers (1967), a theatrical release featuring The Man From U.N.C.L.E. characters (and additionally starring Joan Crawford, Telly Savalas and Herbert Lom).

While active in modeling and television commercials until the 1970s, Neil's last network television role was as "Miss Plumpett" on the 1966 season of The Beverly Hillbillies, in which she played a sophisticated foil to Jethro Bodine, played by Max Baer, Jr.

== Personal life ==
Neil was married in 1960 to Anthony K. Roberts, her co-star in The Beach Girls and the Monster and then later the recipient of the 1974 Pulitzer Prize for photojournalism. She retired from active film work in the late 1960s, raised two children and served as the manager of Roberts' photography studio. Following his death in 2005 she relocated to Nevada City, California, where she remains active as a community volunteer.

== Filmography ==
- The Karate Killers (1967)
- The Beach Girls and the Monster (1965)

=== Television ===
- The Lively Ones (1962–63)
- The Dick Van Dyke Show (1964)
- The Man from U.N.C.L.E (1965–1967)
- The Beverly Hillbillies (1966)
