= The Beach Girls and the Monster =

- Directed by: Jon Hall
- Written by: Joan Gardner
- Produced by: Edward Janis
- Starring: Jon Hall; Sue Casey; Arnold Lessing; Elaine DuPont; Walker Edmiston
- Cinematography: Jon Hall
- Edited by: Radley Metzger; Jon Hall
- Music by: Frank Sinatra Jr.
- Distributed by: U.S. Films
- Release date: September 28, 1965
- Running time: 70 minutes
- Country: United States
- Language: English

The Beach Girls and the Monster (retitled Monster from the Surf for 1966 TV release) is a horror beach party film, released in 1965, directed by and starring Jon Hall. It is notable for its surf music instrumental soundtrack, bad acting, and unconvincing rubber monster suit.

== Plot ==
Three surfers and their girlfriends are at the beach when one of the girls, Bunny, runs away from her boyfriend in fun. She is found dead near a cave after being attacked by a seaweed-covered lizard humanoid creature. The sheriff finds mysterious footprints left in the sand, and takes a cast to the laboratory of Dr. Otto Lindsay, a leading oceanographer. Dr. Lindsay's opinion is that it could be from a "fantigua fish", a carnivorous maneater, which has grown large enough to exist out of the ocean in a loathsome seaweed-shrouded anthropomorphic form. The Santa Monica, California beachfront is near Dr. Lindsay's house, and he complains about the "loafers" and "little tramps" who hang about there.

One of these is his son, Richard Lindsay, who used to assist Dr. Lindsay with his studies on mutation. The other members of the household are Richard's salacious stepmother, Vicky, who feels neglected by her older husband and drinks and flirts; and Richard's friend Mark, a sculptor, who lives in the connected guest house, and walks with a limp after being injured in a car accident caused by Richard. Since the accident, Richard wants to live more for the moment and for his girlfriend Jane, and is unwilling to return as his father's research assistant, to his great displeasure. Mark advises Richard to get along with his stepmother and father. They view a film of surfing in Hawaii.

The next day, Richard and Jane avoid the beach and swim in the pool. Vicky goes to the beach alone, and unknowingly almost becomes the creature's next victim. She returns home and models for Mark, taunting the frustrated sculptor who is attracted to her.

Dr. Lindsay again tries to persuade his son to rejoin his research, but Richard prefers to go to a night time beach party, despite the killer on the loose. Dr. Lindsay returns home, where his bored and dissatisfied wife informs him she is leaving him to make a new start. He overhears her then making a date with another man.

During the dancing and music at the beach party, the creature attacks a surfer, Tom, who is left dead and slashed across the face. Mark sees the attack but is unable to prevent it; he finds a strange strip of rubber in the sand.

A very drunk Vicky returns home, and finds a typed note purportedly from Mark asking to speak to her in his room. There, she is attacked and killed by the creature, and her face hideously scarred. Mark returns, and finds a rubber mask in the kitchen cupboard. The creature attacks him. After a struggle, he stabs the creature with a kitchen knife and tears off its mask to reveal Dr. Otto Lindsay, who escapes in Jane's car. Richard and Jane return to find Mark dying. They inform the police and go with the sheriff, joining the car chase in pursuit of his father. The wounded Dr. Lindsay loses control of the car and is killed in a fiery crash. The sheriff theorizes that Dr. Lindsay was doing it for Richard.

== Cast ==
- Jon Hall as Dr. Otto Lindsay
- Sue Casey as Vicky Lindsay
- Walker Edmiston as Mark
- Elaine DuPont as Jane
- Arnold Lessing as Richard Lindsay
- Read Morgan as Sheriff Michaels
- Carolyn Williamson as Sue
- Gloria Neil as Bunny
- Kal Roberts as Brad (credited as Tony Roberts)
- Clyde Adler as Deputy Scott
- Dale Davis as Tom
- Kingsley the Lion as Himself

== Production ==
The surfing footage used for the scene where Richard runs a film for Mark was shot by one of the most prolific surf filmmakers of the 1960s, Dale Davis, who played Tom, and produced Walk on the Wet Side, Strictly Hot, and The Golden Breed, which has been compared with The Endless Summer as the ultimate sixties surf documentary.

According to the trailer for the film, the dancing girls seen in the film are "The Watusi Dancing Girls" from Hollywood's Whisky a Go Go club on Sunset Boulevard.

All Mark's "sculptures", the creature's head, and the "Kingsley the Lion" puppet used in the film, were created by the actor who played Mark, Walker Edmiston, the host of The Walker Edmiston Show, a children's television program in Los Angeles, which featured original puppet characters, including Kingsley the Lion.

== Music ==
The score for The Beach Girls and the Monster was arranged and conducted by Chuck Sagle, and a few of the musicians assembled for the soundtrack were members of the surf band The Hustlers (who are known for their songs "Kopout," "Inertia" and "Wailin' Out") from Riverside, California. In the book, Pop Surf Culture, written by Brian Chidester and Domenic Priore, the soundtrack of The Beach Girls and the Monster "has got to rank up there among the best ... no fewer than 13 different sections of full-bore, deep-reverb tank surf instrumentals throb the soundtrack."

The theme song, "Dance Baby Dance", was written by Frank Sinatra Jr. and Joan Janis and produced by Edward Janis. Arnold Lessing, who plays Richard, wrote the song he sings in the film, "More Than Wanting You". Walker Edmiston and Elaine DuPont, who play Mark and Jane respectively, wrote "There's a Monster in the Surf".

== Critical reception ==
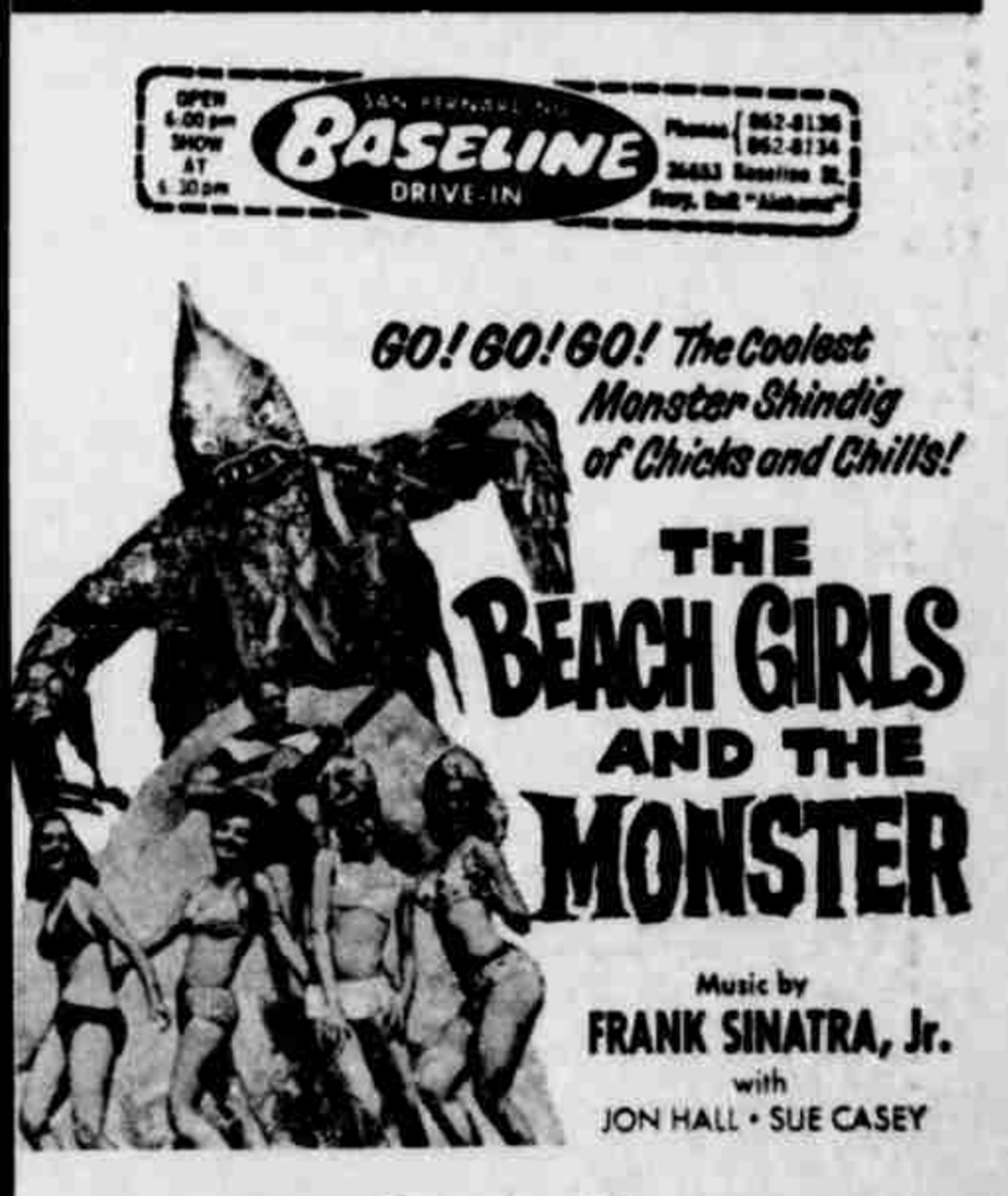
Drive-in advertisement from 1965

Writing in AllMovie, reviewer Cavett Binion described the film as a "hysterically awful rubber-suit monster romp" with "a certain ugly charm, according it "so-bad-it's-good" status." A review in DVDTalk reported that "Hall's direction is uninspired, most of the acting is limp, and the dialogue is laughable," that "Frank Sinatra Jr. is credited with providing much of the surfy music, and his score doesn't seem appropriate to any given scene," but that "unlike similar 'so bad, it's good' efforts [...] The Beach Girls and the Monster doesn't overstay its welcome or feel tiresome halfway through." TV Guide described the film as having "some good suspenseful moments, but, overall, a cheapie scare flick." Filmink called it "hugely bad and great fun."

== Legacy ==
In the early 1970s, the film inspired the hoax of the Thetis Lake Monster.

The film was featured in an episode of Deadly Cinema. The film is listed in Golden Raspberry Award founder John Wilson's book The Official Razzie Movie Guide as one of "The 100 Most Enjoyably Bad Movies Ever Made." It was also featured in an episode of The Twisted Tales of Felix the Cat in which Felix is trapped inside a VCR and has to survive various movies. In 2019 film was used as source material in surf rock band Robert Shredford's music video for the song "Shreddy Betty".

== See also ==
- List of American films of 1965
