= Every Living Thing: The Great and Deadly Race to Know All Life =

2024 book by Jason Roberts

- Author: Jason Roberts
- Genre: Biography
- Publisher: Random House
- Publication date: 9 April 2024
- Pages: 432
- ISBN: 9781984855206

Every Living Thing: The Great and Deadly Race to Know All Life is a 2024 book by Jason Roberts. The book is a biography of 18th-century Swedish botanist Carl Linnaeus, known as the founding father of taxonomy, and his fellow naturalist the Comte de Buffon. The book was the winner of the 2025 Pulitzer Prize for Biography.

== Awards ==
Awards for Every Living Thing
Year	Award	Result	Ref.
2025	Pulitzer Prize for Biography	Won	
2025	PEN/E. O. Wilson Literary Science Writing Award	Won	
