= J Henry Fair =

American photographer and environmentalist

J Henry Fair is an American photographer, environmental activist, and co-founder of the Wolf Conservation Center in South Salem, New York. Born in Charleston, South Carolina, he currently lives and works in New York City.

With his photos, Fair has called attention to environmental and political problems in different regions of the world. Fair has had touring photography exhibits in the US, Europe, and Asia. Additionally, he travels around the world, giving environmental symposia to teach audiences about consumer responsibility and environmental awareness. Fair's work has been published in The New York Times and magazines National Geographic, Vanity Fair, TIME, and New York and featured on European Television networks like Arte, and TTT, and American programs likeToday and Marketplace, television and radio, respectively.

== Industrial Scars ==
Through large-scale aerial photo shoots and accompanying documentary research, Fair's Industrial Scars project explores the industrial detritus of our consumer society. Industrial Scars subjects range from oil drilling and coal ash waste to large-scale agricultural production and abandoned mining operations. In small airplanes, he circles above industrial areas and photographs with a bird's eye perspective the effects these operations have on our environment. Topics of particular interest include the global warming process, environmental pollution, and habitat destruction—all of which are illustrated in Fair's photographs.

== On The Edge ==
With his project "On The Edge", using again aerial photography, Fair turns his attention to the issue of the impact of climate change on the coastlines, showing how sea-level rise is eating away at coastal communities and landscapes of the US east coast. The first publication from the project, Fair's third book, depicts the South Carolina coast.

== Activism ==
J Henry Fair participates in numerous environmental efforts around the world, usually with his art, and he is co-founder (with pianist, Hélène Grimaud) of the Wolf Conservation Center (WCC) of South Salem, NY. The WCC promotes wolf conservation by teaching about wolves, their relationship to the environment, and the human role in protecting their future. To accomplish its mission, WCC holds regular educational programs to discuss wolf conservation, supports wolf reintroduction in federally designated areas that can sustain viable wolf populations, and provides a natural habitat for a few captive wolves where observation of natural behavior is possible. WCC is the preeminent facility in the eastern United States for the captive breeding and pre-release of endangered wolf species.

Fair has collaborated on high-priority issues with environmental organizations such as NRDC, the Rainforest Alliance, Waterkeeper Alliance, and the Open Space Institute.

== Bibliography ==
The Day After Tomorrow: Images Of Our Earth In Crisis -Publisher: PowerHouse Books, 2010. ISBN 9781576875605 With essays by James Hansen, Allen Hershkowitz, Jack Hitt, Roger D. Hodge, Frances Mayes, John Rockwell, and Tensie Whelan Industrial Scars: The Hidden Costs of Consumption -Publisher: Papadakis Books, 2016. ISBN 978-1-906506-61-2 Foreword by Bill McKibben, 350.org. On The Edge: From Combahee to Winyah -Publisher: Papadakis Books, 2019. - ISBN 9781906506650 Foreword by Dana Beach, Founder Coastal Conservation League
