= John Lewis: A Life =

Biography book about John Lewis

- Author: David Greenberg
- Language: English
- Subject: Biography
- Genre: Nonfiction
- Publication date: October 2024
- Publication place: United States
- Media type: Print
- Pages: 704
- ISBN: 9781982142995
- OCLC: 1420428966
- Dewey Decimal: B L6747GR 2024

John Lewis: A Life is a biographical account of the late United States CongressmanJohn Lewis. This book was written by David Greenberg and published in October 2024 by Simon & Schuster.

== Synopsis ==
Greenberg's book follows Lewis's life before, during, and after the Civil Rights Movement. Lewis led the Voter Education Project, registering many Black voters in the South. The book also details Lewis's political career, starting locally in Atlanta, Georgia, and then in the United States Congress. He was respected by both Democrats and Republicans for his dedication to nonviolent integration and was seen as a moral compass in the United States Congress.

Greenberg's biography is based on extensive research, archival documents and more than 400 interviews. The book provides new material pertaining to Lewis's personal and professional life. It details his role in the Civil Rights Movement, providing details of his role during the Selma to Montgomery marches in 1965, where Lewis was severely beaten and almost died. This biography also chronicles Lewis's legacy of fighting for equality and justice.

Greenberg also writes that Lewis was an honest person, devoted to the civil rights movement and similar causes. His experiences with racial segregation taught him bravery in the face of wrongdoings and provided him with a story that sometimes exceeded practical solutions. Later in his life, he faced the challenge of reconciling the idealistic language of the 1960s activism with the more mundane everyday politics, which often appeared trivial or corrupt in contrast.

== Reception ==
This biography, which was a finalist for the 2025 Dayton Literary Peace Prize, has been well received. In a review for The New York Times, Brent Staples described the book as "panoramic and richly insightful... This biography sets a new standard by giving Lewis’s post-civil-rights story the depth of attention it deserves... Numerous interviews." Kelefa Sanneh of The New Yorker wrote: "Appropriately weighty... Less hagiographic... Some biographers must wrestle with their subjects’ inconsistencies, but Greenberg, for the most part, has the opposite challenge: Lewis seems to have been a stubbornly straightforward character... [A] careful account." AP News said, "Greenberg conducted hundreds of interviews for the biography, including with Lewis himself, and that work shows throughout the book."

== See also ==
- The 1954-1968 Civil rights movement
- Martin Luther King
- John Lewis
