= Moises Saman =

Spanish-Peruvian photographer

Moises Saman (born 1974) is a Spanish-Peruvian conflict photographer, based in Tokyo. He is a full member of Magnum Photos and is best known for his photographs from Iraq. His book Discordia (2016) is about the revolution in Egypt and the broader Arab Spring. Glad Tidings of Benevolence (2023) is about the Iraq War.

Saman has won multiple awards from World Press Photo and Pictures of the Year International, and has received a Guggenheim Fellowship. In 2025 he won Pulitzer Prize for Feature Photography.

== Life and work ==
Saman was born Lima, Peru. His father is Peruvian and his mother is Spanish. At the age of one, his family relocated from Peru to Barcelona, Spain, where Moises spent most of his youth. He is considered "one of the leading conflict photographers of his generation." He worked as a photojournalist in the Middle East from 2011 to 2014. He is best known for his photographs from the wars in Iraq: the Gulf War, the Iraq War, and the Iraqi Civil War but has also worked in Afghanistan, Egypt, Libya, and Syria including in rebel-held areas there. He covered the Arab Spring and the Syrian Civil War for The New Yorker and has worked for Human Rights Watch. It was during this period in the Middle East that he made Discordia (2016), a book of personal work about the revolution in Egypt and the broader Arab Spring.

In 2010 Saman was invited to join Magnum Photos as a nominee and became a full member in 2014.

== Publications ==
=== Publications by Saman ===
- Discordia. Self-published, 2016. Photographs and short essays by Saman. Edited and with collages by Daria Birang.
- Glad Tidings of Benevolence. London: Gost, 2023. ISBN 978-1910401736. With a preface by Sinan Antoon.

=== Publications with contributions by Saman ===
- Home. Tokyo: Magnum Photos Tokyo, 2018. ISBN 978-4-9909806-0-3.

== Awards ==
- 2007: Third prize, stories, Daily Life category, World Press Photo Awards, World Press Photo, Amsterdam.
- 2007: Third prize, stories, General News category, World Press Photo Awards, World Press Photo, Amsterdam.
- 2008: Citation, The Olivier Rebbot Award, 2007 Overseas Press Club awards, New York City.
- 2008: Third Place, Magazine Photographer of the Year, Sixty Fifth Pictures of the Year International Competition, Pictures of the Year International.
- 2014: Second prize, singles, General News category, World Press Photo Awards, World Press Photo, Amsterdam.
- 2014: W. Eugene Smith Memorial Fund fellowship for Discordia.
- 2015: Second Place, Spot News, Seventy Second Pictures of the Year International Competition, Pictures of the Year International. For "Tragedy on Mount Sinjar".
- 2015: Guggenheim Fellowship from the John Simon Guggenheim Memorial Foundation.
- 2016: Winner, The Anamorphosis Prize ($10,000), for Discordia.
