= Languages of Guinea-Bissau =

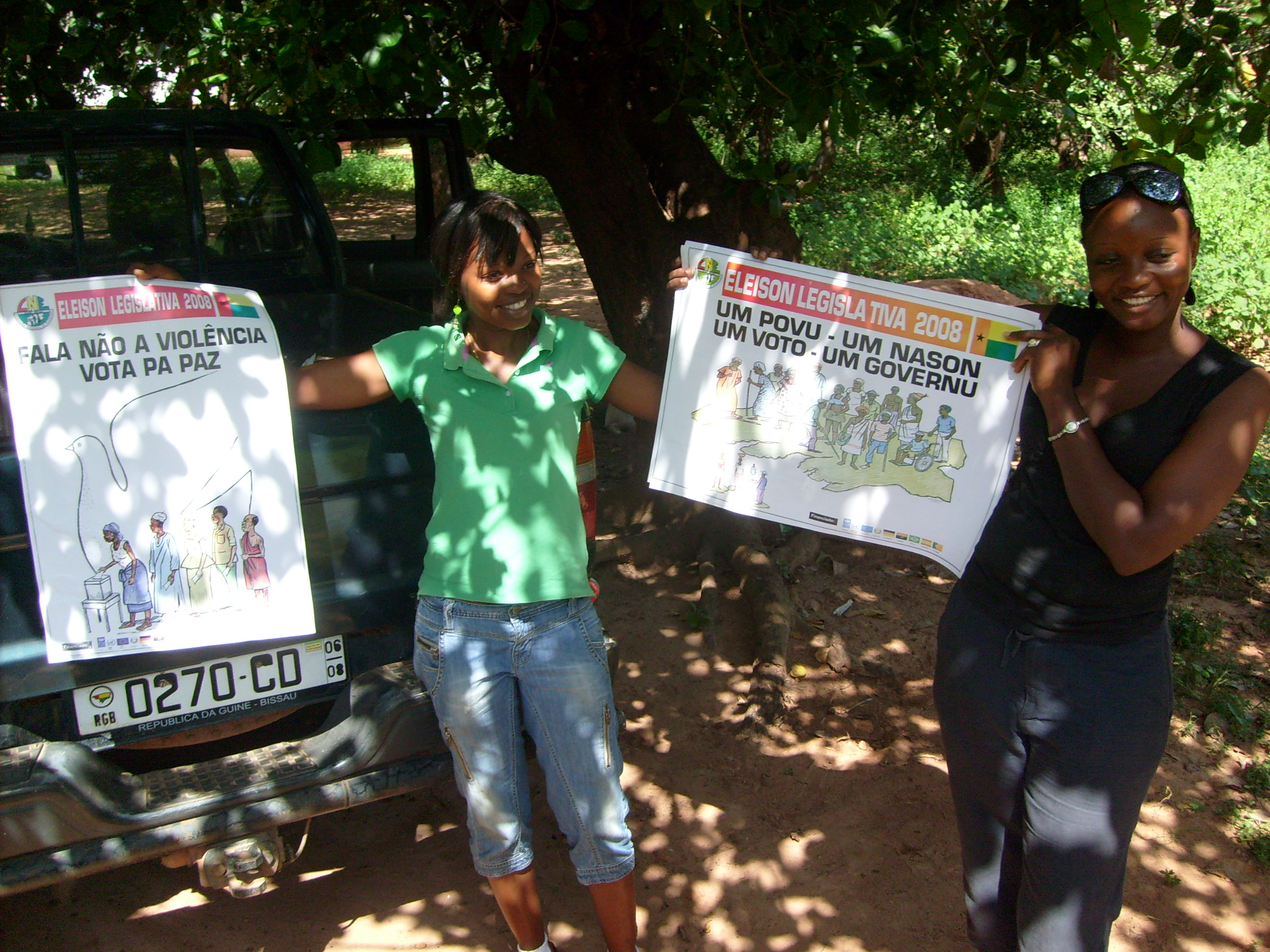
- Voter education posters in the Kriyol language for Guinea-Bissau legislative election, 2008, Biombo Region.
- Official: Portuguese
- Recognised: Badyara, Bainouk-Gunyuño, Balanta-Kentohe, Bassari, Bayot, Biafada, Bijago, Fula, Jola-Felupe, Jola-Fonyi, Kasanga, Kobiana, Mandinka, Manjak, Mankanya, Mansoanka, Nalu, Papel, Soninke
- Vernacular: Guinea-Bissau Creole
- Foreign: French, English
- Signed: Guinea-Bissau Sign Language
- Keyboard layout: Portuguese QWERTY

Languages of Guinea-Bissau according to the 2009 Census
Languages	percent
Portuguese Creole	90.4%
Portuguese	27.2%
Fula	25.7%
Balanta	19.7%
Mandinka	12.8%
Papel	7.4%
Manjak	7.3%
French	5.1%
English	2.9%
Biafada	2.8%
Mankanya	2.4%
Bijago	1.7%
Felupe	1.6%
Mansoanka	1.1%
Balanta Mane	0.8%
Sosso	0.7%
Nalu	0.6%
Spanish	0.5%
Saracule	0.4%
Russian	0.1%
Other	1.8%
Calculation details (Note: The 2009 Census questionnaire treated European and African languages differently. European languages were línguas, and people responded with all European languages they knew. African languages were dialectos, and people responded with at most one primary dialect. As a result, the African languages may be underrepresented in this data compared to the European languages. Data for Portuguese Creole and European languages are from Quadro 6 (page 38) of the 2009 Census Report. Data for the African languages are from Quadro 4 of the Appendix (page 72-73) of the 2009 Census Report.)

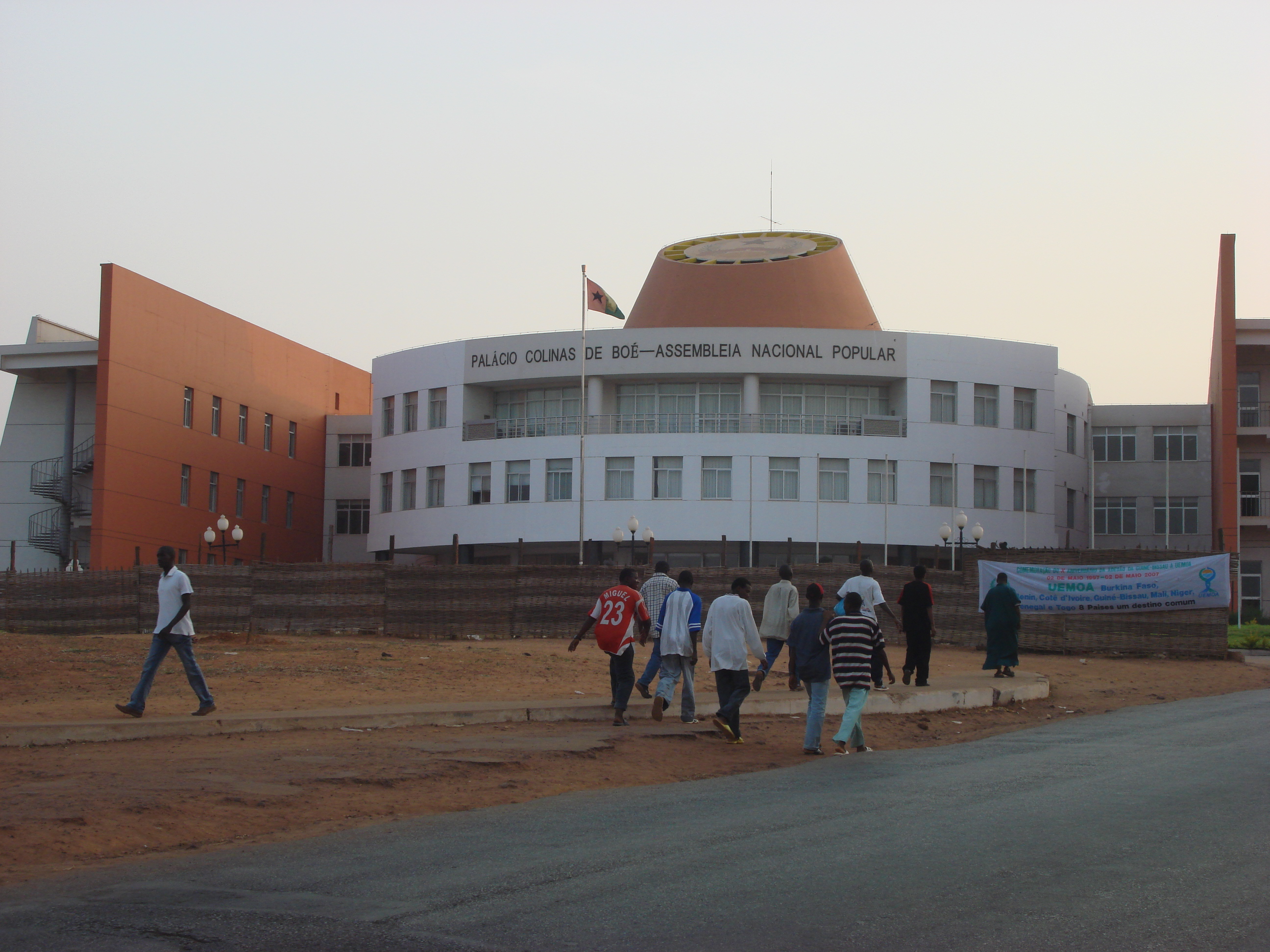
The National Assembly with signs in Portuguese.

The people of Guinea-Bissau speak a collection of European and African languages. The official language is Portuguese, though it is rare as a first language. The most widely spoken language is Guinea-Bissau Creole (Kriyol). Ethnologue lists a further 17 indigenous African languages based within Guinea-Bissau, with all of them belonging to the Niger-Congo language family. English and French are also prominent, as they are spoken in neighboring countries.

Guinea-Bissau's sociolinguistic situation has been argued to be triglossic, with Portuguese representing the prestige language of government and higher education, Kriyol representing the most widely used and understood lingua franca, and the African languages in common use for local communication, especially in the rural areas.

== Portuguese ==
Portuguese is the official language of Guinea-Bissau. However, it is not very widely spoken within the country. Approximately 30% of Bissau-Guineans speak Portuguese, but only 2% use it as a home language. This is nevertheless an increase in Portuguese's reach; in the 1979 census, only 11% of Guineans spoke Portuguese.

Portuguese became the official language within Guinea-Bissau during the colonial period, as part of Portuguese Guinea. The 1914 Basic law of Portuguese Guinea required literacy in Portuguese as a requirement for citizenship and voting rights; this was clarified in 1917 to specifically exclude Kriyol knowledge from counting as Portuguese literacy. Government and education were also mandated to use Portuguese. In addition to their official support of Portuguese, colonial officials denigrated Kriyol as "unpatriotic", "ridiculous", "truncated", and a "disgrace", treating it as nothing more than a broken form of Portuguese. Despite this, Kriyol remained the dominant language in urban areas throughout the remainder of the colonial era, with local indigenous languages dominating the countryside and Portuguese limited to the halls of government.

Although Guinea-Bissau gained independence through a war against Portugal, Portuguese maintained its official role post-independence. Amílcar Cabral, the head of the main independence movement, believed that the Portuguese language could be useful to the movement and the country. He wrote that Portuguese was "one of the best things the tugas [whites/colonialists] left us", due to its utility as an international language with a well-established writing system. He also rejected the idea that knowing indigenous languages was sufficient for being a good Bissau-Guinean, citing examples of Portuguese collaborators who spoke African languages. For Cabral, language was a tool, and Portuguese happened to be a particularly useful one for the country at that time.

While Portuguese still carries official weight in Guinea-Bissau, its specific social role remains in flux. Portuguese is the prestige language of the country, and is perceived as the language of education, culture, and science. At the same time, Creole is dominant in daily life as the lingua franca of the country, and has begun to take on some prestige roles in public services and bilingual education. Portuguese may also be losing some prestige due to international pressures to use French (as the common language of many West African countries) or English.

== Guinea-Bissau Creole ==
The most widely spoken language in Guinea-Bissau is Guinea-Bissau Creole, generally called Kriyol, Crioulo, or Kriol. It is the country's lingua franca, spoken by over 90% of Bissau-Guineans. Kriyol's use has grown substantially in recent years, as only 44% of Guineans spoke Kriyol in 1979. It also now has a written form, something it lacked during the struggle for Bissau-Guinean independence, although the orthography has not been standardized.

Kriyol is a creole language with Portuguese and African language aspects, and has a great deal of sociolinguistic variability. Geographically, there are at least three varieties of Kriyol (Northern, Central, Eastern). There is also some age-based differentiation in forms; younger people's Kriyol has more Portuguese morphology and phonology, while older people's Kriyol is morphologically closer to the indigenous languages. As a result, some scholars have argued that Kriyol is undergoing the process of decreolization.

Kriyol has a long history; it was referenced by Portuguese traders as early as 1584, though it appears to have been mostly limited to Portuguese trading posts (praças) in the area until the 1900s. Since then, Kriyol has seen rapid growth within Guinea-Bissau, partially due to its use by the independence movement PAIGC in primary schools in liberated areas of the country during the independence war. In 1963, the PAIGC called for the "stimulation" of Kriyol alongside indigenous languages as part of their demands, and used it as an interethnic lingua franca. Over time, it transformed from a language of colonization to a language of liberation, and some scholars argue that its adoption represented a "sociolinguistic concept of independence".

At present, Kriyol is the dominant language in the country, though it is not the most prestigious. Even political debates within the ostensibly Portuguese-speaking Guinean parliament are mostly in kriyol, as is much of the country's mass media. This results in a diglossic, or even triglossic, sociolinguistic situation. Kriyol dominates the public sphere, though it carries less prestige and governmental support than Portuguese, setting up one diglossia. However, Kriyol has more power and prestige than the indigenous languages, setting up a second diglossia.

== Indigenous languages ==
A man speaking Mandinka

Ethnologue lists 17 African languages as indigenous to Guinea-Bissau. All of them are classified as part of the Niger-Congo language family. (Note: Ethnologue includes Kriyol and Guinea-Bissau Sign Language in their count to reach 19 indigenous languages, but these are covered in other sections.) Native languages include Balanta, Fula, Mandjak, Mandinka, Jola, and Papel.

The 2009 Census found that about 94% of the population speaks at least one indigenous language, with more speakers in rural (98%) than in urban settings (88%). Fula is the most widely spoken African language in Guinea-Bissau, with nearly as many speakers as Portuguese has. The Fula language extends well beyond the borders of Guinea-Bissau, with dialects spoken throughout West Africa. Balanta and Mandinka are commonly spoken both within the country and outside its borders.

The use of African languages are tied closely, but not entirely, to ethnicity; a majority of people identifying themselves with any major Guinean ethnic group also spoke the language of that ethnic group. Fula people were most likely to speak their own language, with 87% of them speaking Fula. The Nalu people were least likely to speak their own language, but they still had a slim majority (55%) speaking the Nalu language. Of the people who do not speak the language of their ethnic group, some speak no African languages at all, while others speak another ethnic group's language. Even Guineans who do not identify as belonging to a specific ethnic group often speak an indigenous language (30%).

Although there are no formal educational uses of the indigenous languages, they often are used in rural areas as a language of instruction for early education before children develop sufficient abilities in Kriol or Portuguese. Despite this, neither literacy initiatives nor educational use of the languages are common, and this contributes to their decline. Colonial-era biases, elevating Portuguese as a cultured language and denigrating indigenous languages as uncultured, persist that discourage education in African languages.

== Guinea-Bissau Sign Language ==
Guinea-Bissau Sign Language is an emerging sign language developing within the country. It is unrelated to other signed languages, except for its manual alphabet, which is borrowed from Portuguese Sign Language.

The language was developed from the ground up at a school in Bissau, the country's capital. The school was founded in 2002 as a school for blind students, but Deaf students quickly outnumbered the blind students. The school did not have teaching resources for Deaf students, with one of the few available resources being a poster of the manual alphabet from Portuguese Sign Language. However, the students themselves brought home sign and village sign languages, and by 2006, a clear lexicon had emerged and was being documented within the school. Between 2008 and 2013, 82% of the signs were stable.

== Other languages ==
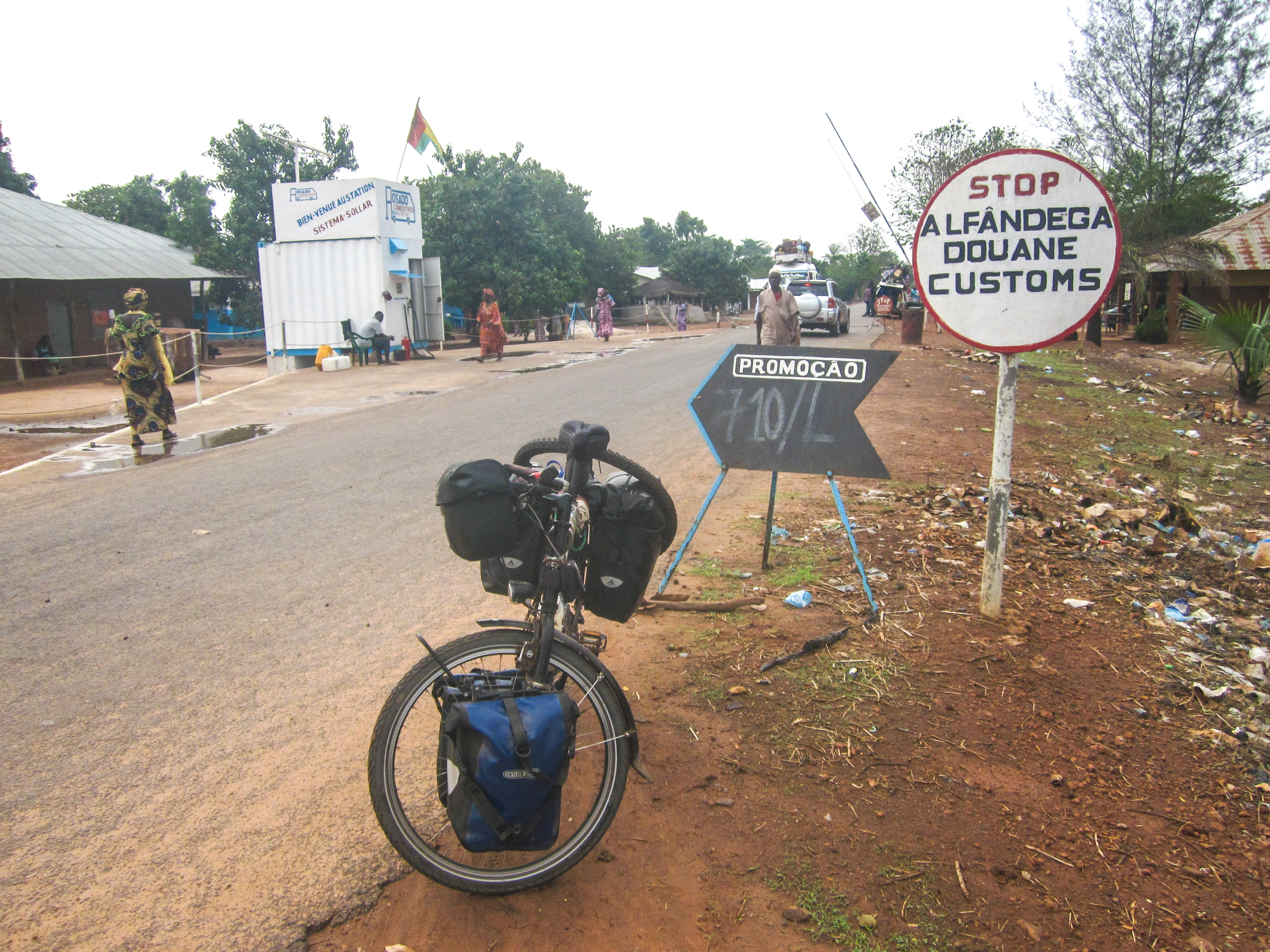
A trilingual (Portuguese-French-English) sign at the border of Senegal and Guinea-Bissau

French is taught in schools as foreign language, because Guinea-Bissau is surrounded by French-speaking countries and is a full member of the La Francophonie as well as the Lusophone Community of Portuguese Language Countries.

== See also ==
- Languages of Cape Verde
- Cape Verde Creole
- Languages of Angola
- Niger-Congo language family
