= Senegambian stone circles =

Archaeological site in Senegal and the Gambia

Stone Circles of Senegambia
UNESCO World Heritage Site
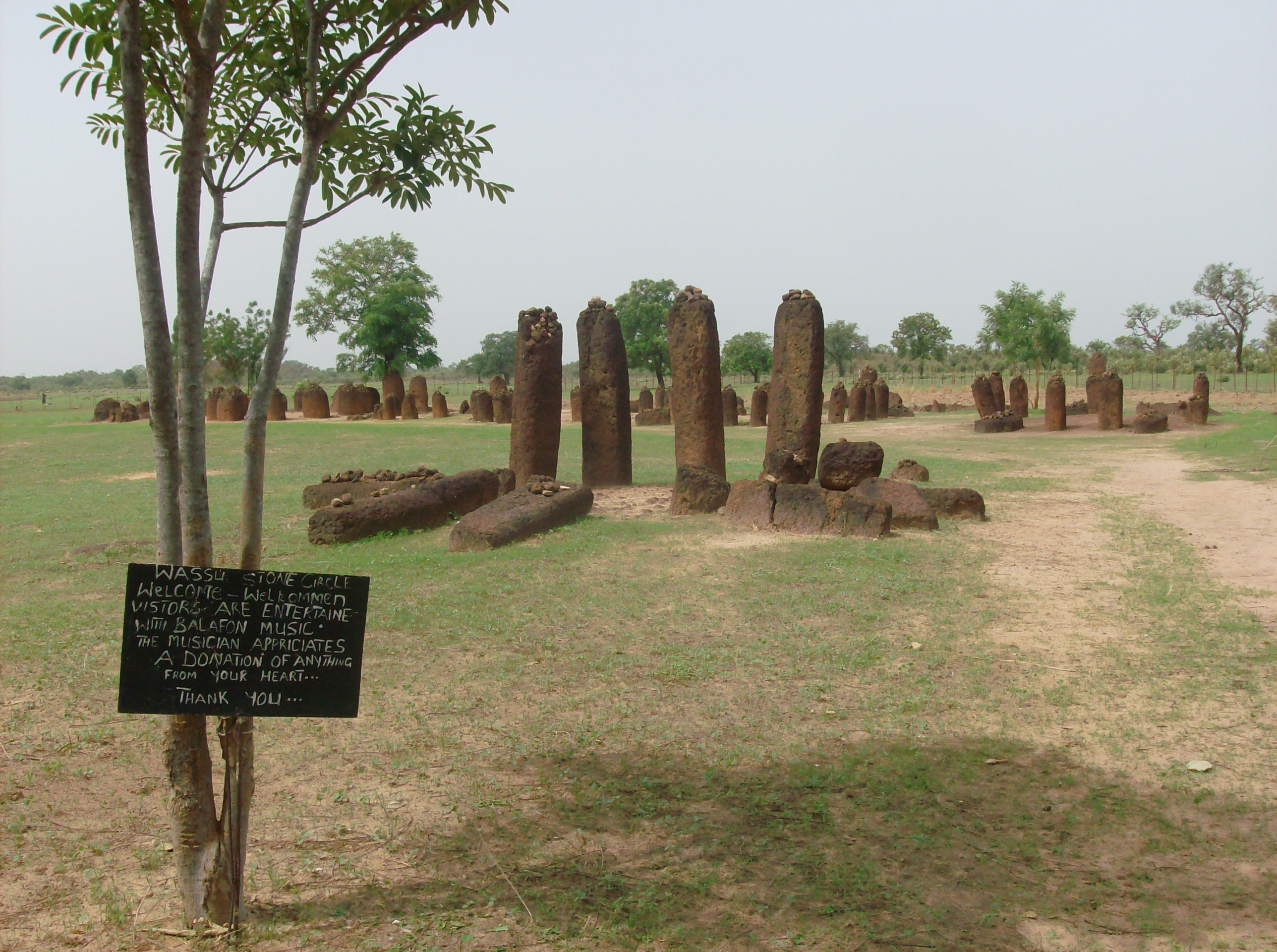
- Wassu stone circles

- Location within The Gambia Location within Senegal
- Location: The Gambia and Senegal
- Includes: Kerbatch; Wassu; Sine Ngayène; Wanar
- Criteria: Cultural: (i), (iii)
- Reference: 1226
- Inscription: 2006 (30th Session)
- Area: 9.85 ha (24.3 acres)
- Buffer zone: 110.05 ha (271.9 acres)
- Coordinates: 13°41′28″N 15°31′21″W

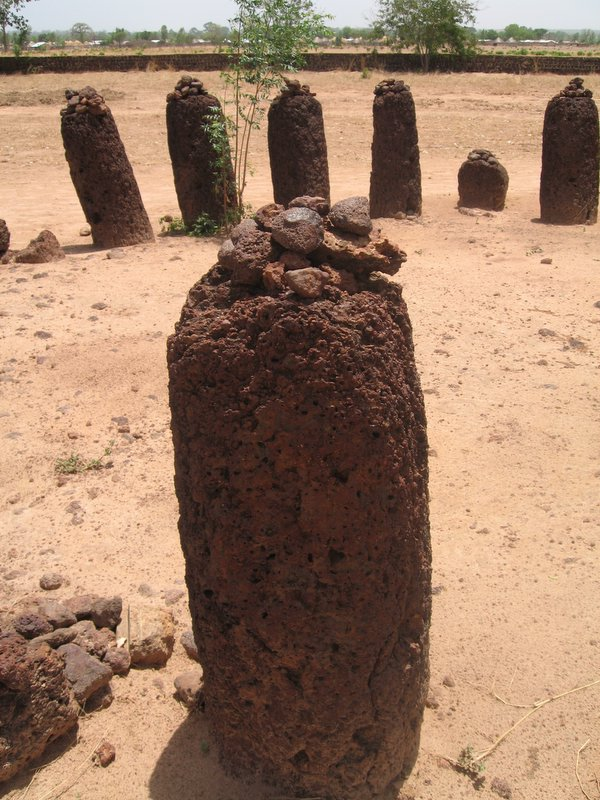
Wassu stone circles

The Senegambian stone circles (French: Cercles mégalithiques de Sénégambie), or the Wassu stone circles, are groups of megalithic stone circles located in the Gambia north of Janjanbureh and in central Senegal. Spread across a region 30,000 km^{2} (12,000 sq mi), they are sometimes divided into the Wassu (Gambian) and Sine-Saloum (Senegalese) circles, but this is purely a national division. Containing over 1,000 stone circles and tumuli (1,145 sites are recorded by a 1982 study) spread across an area 350 km (220 mi) long and 100 km (62 mi) wide, the Senegambian stone circles are the largest concentration of stone circles seen anywhere in the world, and they are an extensive sacred landscape that was used for more than 1,500 years. The sites were inscribed on the UNESCO World Heritage List in 2006.

== Description and history ==
The stone circles and other megaliths found in Senegal and Gambia are sometimes divided into four large sites: Sine Ngayène and Wanar in Senegal, and Wassu and Kerr Batch in the Central River Division in Gambia. Among these four main areas, there are approximately 29,000 stones, 17,000 monuments, and 2,000 individual sites. The monuments consist of what were originally upright blocks or pillars (some have collapsed), mostly made of laterite, with smooth surfaces. The monoliths are found in circles, double circles, isolated or standing apart from circles (usually to the east) in rows, or individually. Stones found standing apart are called frontal stones. When there are frontal stones in two parallel, connected rows, they are called lyre-stones.

Researchers are not certain when these monuments were built, but the generally accepted range is between the 3rd century BCE and the 16th century CE. Burial mounds near the Wassu complex have been dated to AD 927–1305, although it is not clear whether the burial mounds were constructed before or after the stone circles. Archaeologists have also found pottery shards, human burials, and some grave goods and metals around the megalithic circles. A small collection of these can be found in the British Museum's collection that was donated by the colonial administrator Richmond Palmer.

The construction of the stone monuments shows evidence of a prosperous and organized society based on the amount of labor required to build such structures. The stones were extracted from laterite quarries using iron tools, although few of these quarries have been identified as directly linked to particular sites. After extracting the stone, identical pillars were made, either cylindrical or polygonal, with averages at two meters high and weighing seven tons.

=== Attribution ===
There is no consensus among historians and archaeologists as to who built these megalithic structures, in part because no existing group claims that their ancestors were responsible in their surviving oral histories. The structures share similarities with buildings and funerary practices in several existing cultures, such as the Serer, Konyagui, and Bassari people. Some contemporary elites, including scholars, have ignored the diverse and complicated historical and archaeological evidence and instead rushed to proclaim their particular ethnic group as the monument builders.

The Senegalese historian and anthropologist Cheikh Anta Diop argued that the Serer built the monuments and many similar ones across the Sahel during a hypothesized migration from the Nile River valley. Wolof and Fula oral traditions also have the Serer as the builders. The Serer themselves, however, credit them to the Soos wee or Soos waa Kaabu, the 'men from the beginning of Kaabu'. These 'Soos' or 'Sose' are, in Serer oral history, the former occupants of the area, but their ethnolinguistic identity is debated.

Some historians believe that they were a group speaking a Mande language who migrated from the Wagadu Empire to flee a drought towards the end of the first millennium CE. According to this theory, the Sose were assimilated or displaced when the Serer of the north arrived in the 11th century, although the newcomers may have adopted their funerary customs. 'Socé' is the modern-day term for Mande peoples in the Wolof and Serer languages.

Babacar Sédikh Diouf has pointed out that there is a Serer matrilineage named 'Soos', whose members may have been the first of the migrants to arrive in the Sine-Saloum region. The Serer have used funerary houses similar to those found at the Wanar site up until the present.

Another theory holds that the stone circles were built by one or more cultures that were subsequently pushed south across the Gambia by the incoming Serer, Mandinka, and Wolof. The Bassari in particular, who now live in the Kedougou region of southeastern Senegal, still bury important community members in necropolises of stone funerary huts, with construction techniques, burial chambers, and commemoration practices extremely similar to those uncovered at the stone circle sites.

== World Heritage Sites ==
The Gambia:

- Stone circles of Kerr Batch 13.754565°N 15.068131°W
- Stone circles of Wassu 13.691525°N 14.873111°W

Senegal:

- Stone circles of Wanar 13.856425°N 15.617642°W
- Stone circles of Sine Ngayène 13.695278°N 15.535278°W

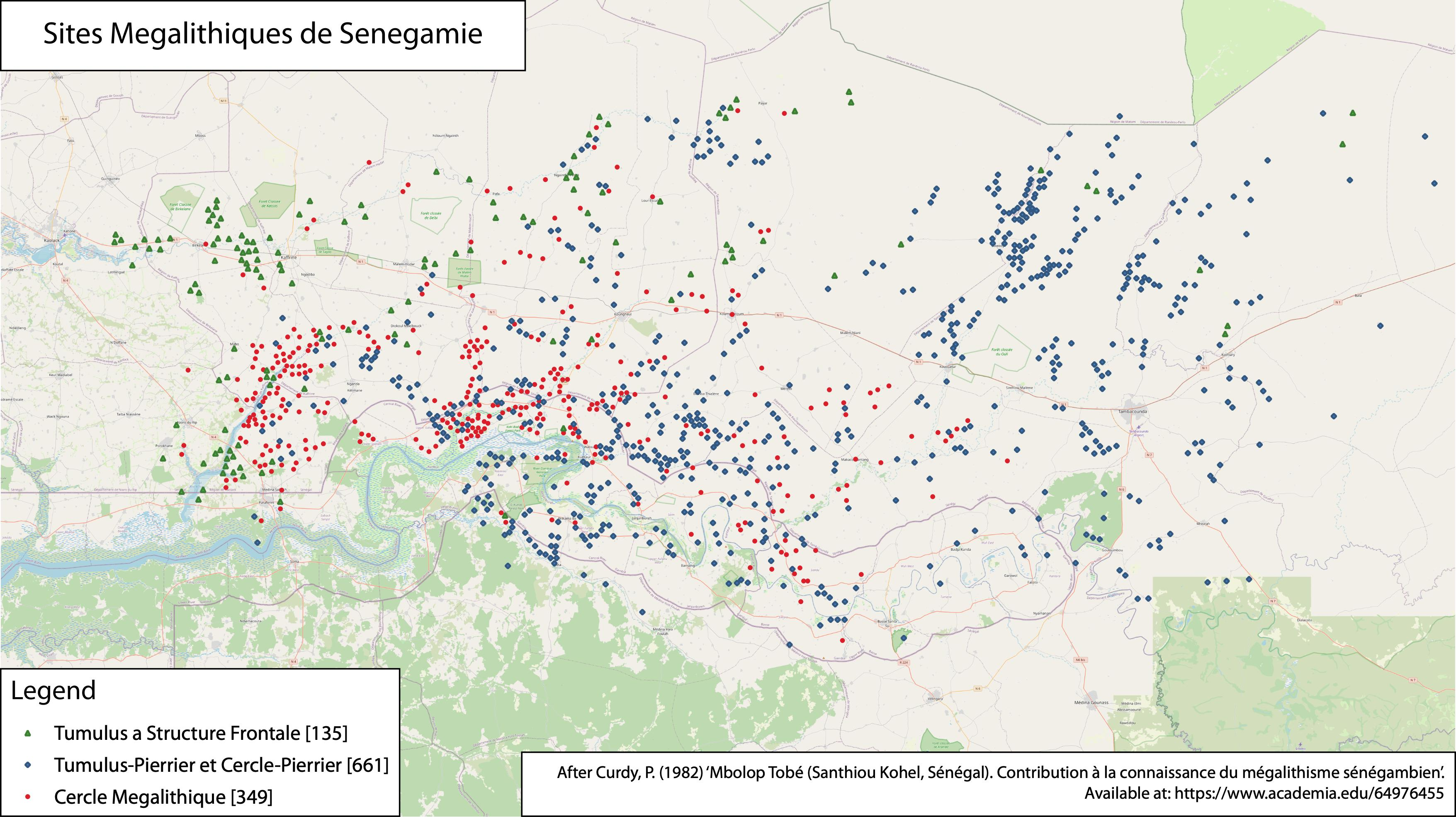
Megalithic sites in Senegambia

=== Kerr Batch ===
Kerr Batch, an area comprising nine stone circles and one double circle, is located in Gambia's Nianija district. Kerr Batch features a V-shaped, "bifid" stone (the only one in the region) that had broken in three places and fallen. This stone, which had been part of a frontal line, was restored during the 1965 Anglo-Gambian Stone Circles Expedition, led by Paul Ozanne. During this expedition, Ozanne and his team excavated the double circle at Kerr Batch.

=== Wassu ===
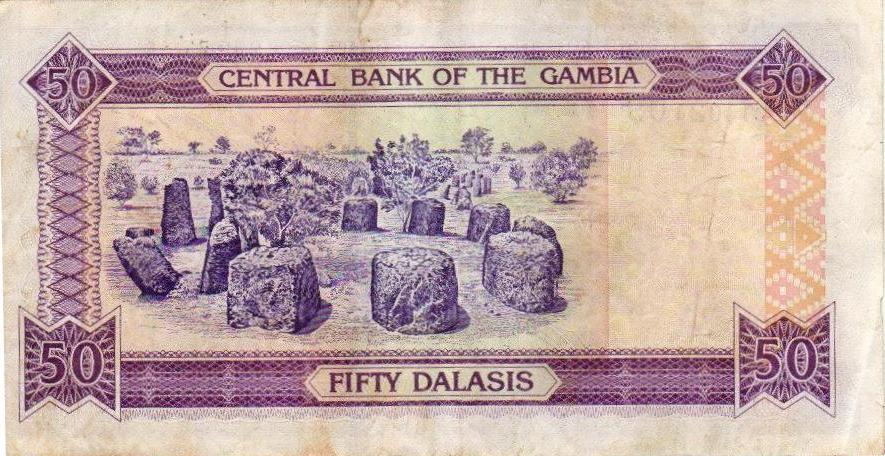
The Wassu stone circles on the Gambia 50 dalasi banknote

Wassu is located in the Niani district of Gambia and is made up of 11 stone circles and their associated frontal stones. The tallest stone is found in this area, with a height of 2.59 meters. The builders of the monuments here possessed great knowledge of their local geology in order to find the sources of laterite stones. They must also have had great technical ability in order to extract these stones without splitting or cracking them. The most recent excavations conducted on these megalithic circles date to the Anglo-Gambian campaign led by Evans and Ozanne in 1964 and 1965. The discovery of burials enabled the dating of the monuments to between AD 927 and 1305.

=== Wanar ===
The area of Wanar is located in the Kaffrine Department of Senegal and is made up of 21 stone circles and one double circle. One third of all Senegambian lyre-stones are located at Wanar. All of the monuments found here seem to mark burials, according to the archaeologists working there. Researchers have also determined that the site was a burial ground first, and the stones were added later for ritual uses. Construction of this area can be narrowed down to between the seventh and fifteenth centuries AD.

A dating program has yielded estimates that place the construction of the double circle to between the twelfth and thirteenth centuries AD. A 2008 excavation was conducted on the double circle at Wanar, and two types of burials were distinguished: simple burials that consisted of large pits sealed with a mound, and more complex, deeper burials with narrow mouths. There was also presence of perishable materials found in the burials, such as brick and plaster, which suggests the existence of funerary houses built at the time of burial.

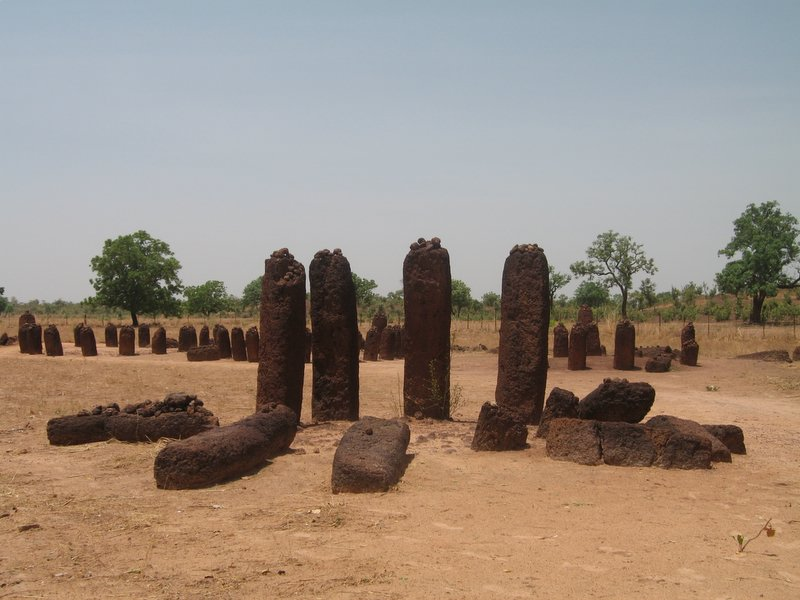
Stone circles at Wassu

Two types of stones were found at Wanar: tall and slender stones that tended to be cylindrical; and shorter, squatter, trapezoidal stones.

There are many other clues to be found at Wanar that are suggestive of what these monuments originally looked like. For instance, the inner ring of the double circle features fallen monoliths that fan out from the center of the monument. This may suggest, coupled with findings of dry stone around the monument, that there used to be dry stone beneath the monoliths, and the cylinder made up of the inner ring and dry stone was once filled with earth, so that when it collapsed due to outward pressure, the stones all fell outward as well. This theory is not refuted by the fact that the stones of the outer ring fell in all different directions, lacking outward pressure.

Pottery shards were also found scattered around the site, buried in different layers of earth. The layers in which the pottery was found indicates that some deposition occurred after the fall of the dry stone, but before the collapse of the monoliths. In other words, pottery may have been deposited at this monument after total and/or partial abandonment of the monoliths. Overall, the destruction of this double circle was a slow disintegration over time, as opposed to one large and sudden collapse.

Based on all of these findings, researchers have developed a possible model for the funeral activity sequence that took place at Wanar, consisting of three distinct phases: Phase one includes cutting the graves in the subsoil with funerary rites, such as covering the graves with mounds; phase two is when the standing stones were raised around the mounds; phase three consisted of erecting frontal stones. Phase three may also have been when these monuments became sites of ritual activities, and ceramics started getting deposited around them. The creators of this model recognize that other sequences are possible, and the order for the sequence of events at the double circle may have been different as well.

=== Sine Ngayène ===
Sine Ngayène is the largest of the four areas and home of 52 stone circles, one double circle, and 1,102 carved stones. It is generally accepted that the single burials found here predate the multiple burials that are associated with the construction of the stone circles. Sine Ngayène is located just northwest of Sine-Saloum, Senegal, at the coordinates of 15° 32'W, 13° 41'N.

In 2002, an expedition, called Sine Ngayène Archaeological Project, was launched in the Petit-Bao-Bolong drainage tributary. The team found iron smelting sites and quarries located close to the monument sites. They also found evidence of hundreds of homes nearby, dating from around the time of the monuments, clustered in groups of 2–5, with remnants of house floors and pottery shards. This evidence suggests the existence of small, linked, yet independent communities. Researchers have also suggested the possibility that these megalithic cemeteries could have been a focal spot of the cultural landscape and served the purpose of bringing people together.

The site of Sine Ngayène has a Y-shaped central axis, with a double circle (called Diallombere) located at the center of the three branches. Originally, this site was surrounded by hundreds of tumuli (burial mounds) that leveled over time through erosion. Evidence suggests that the burials occurred first, with the stones being erected later, exclusively for the burials. Frontal stones were often erected on the east side of the stone circles. Archaeologists at Sine Ngayène have constructed a timeline with four distinct of successive cycles. These cycles are based on materials buried in successive layers and the monument construction chronology of the double circle at the center of the site. The approximate date range assigned to this timeline ranges from AD 700 to 1350.

Cycle one

Materials for the first cycle are located at approximately 1.6–2.0 meters below the surface and are dated between 700 and 800 AD. The main finding for this cycle was a large, oblong-shaped pit with a concentration of human remains in the form of a secondary burial. The remains were found with five iron spearheads and a copper bracelet. The pit was backfilled and capped with a mound overlaid with scattered laterite blocks. Researchers estimate that the outer circle of stones was built after the initial burial, and two large frontal stones were added.

Cycle Two

The layers analyzed for the second cycle are located at approximately 1.0–1.6 meters below the surface and date between 800 and 900 AD. For this layer, another oblong-shaped burial pit was discovered. This burial area consisted of more selective human bones, mostly long bones, and skulls, buried in discrete episodes. These were also linked to secondary burials. Overall, there were ten skulls, thirty long bones, and one iron spearhead found.

Cycle Three

Cycle three encompasses material between 0.5 and 1.0 meter below the surface and dates to between 900 and 1000 AD. This time period is when the inner circle of monoliths is speculated to have been built. Within this layer, a laterite slab was also discovered, which may have been used as a sacrificial table. The majority of the findings consisted of clay sherds, selected bones (long bones and skulls), and human teeth deposited with pottery. It is during this time that the monument evolved from a selective burial ground to a broader ritual place, becoming more of a "public monument". There was a shift from burials to offerings during this cycle.

Cycle Four

This cycle contains material located from the surface to approximately 0.5 meters below the surface and is dated from anywhere between 1235 and 1427 AD. During this period, there seems to be less frequent use of the monument, and some things recovered from this layer may be accidental re-depositions. The majority of findings from this zone were small bone fragments buried with laterite blocks, located primarily in the inner circle of the monument. There were also some sherds found in one spot, and a secondary burial pit containing 70 bones, seven turquoise beads, and two copper rings. This may suggest long-distance trade among the people who used the monuments. Overall, cycle four contained a mixture of offerings and secondary burials.

== See also ==
- Cekeen Tumulus
- History of Senegal
- History of the Gambia
