= Biafada language =

Senegambian language of Guinea-Bissau

Biafada
- Native to: Guinea-Bissau
- Native speakers: 45,000 (2006)
- Language family: Niger–Congo?: Atlantic–Congo; Atlantic; Senegambian; Tenda; Biafada–Pajade; Biafada

Language codes
- ISO 639-3: bif
- Glottolog: biaf1240
- ELP: Biafada

Biafada (ga-njoola) is a Senegambian language of Guinea-Bissau.

Biafada is heavily influenced by Mandinka. Variants on the name include Beafada, Bedfola, Biafar, Bidyola, Dfola, Fada.
