= Bapeng language =

Extinct Senegambian language of Senegal

Bapeng
- Mopeny
- Native to: Senegal
- Extinct: mid-20th century
- Language family: Niger–Congo?: Atlantic–Congo; Atlantic; Senegambian; Tenda; Bapeng

Language codes
- ISO 639-3: None (mis)
- Glottolog: bape1239
- Linguasphere: 90-JAA-ac

Bapeng (Bapɛŋ, Mopeny, Pe) is an extinct Senegambian language of Senegal spoken by traditional hunter-gatherers.
