= KCJ =

KCJ may refer to:

- Kenya Ceramic Jiko, a type of stove
- Kerala Congress (Joseph), a former political party in India led by P. J. Joseph, split from Kerala Congress and later merged into it
- Kids Code Jeunesse, a Canadian non-profit organization
- Kigali Cine Junction, a film festival held in Kigali, Rwanda
- Knight Commander of the Order of Saint Joachim
- Kobiana language (ISO code 'kcj')
- PT KAI Commuter Jabodetabek, now Kai Commuter
