= Baïnounk Gubëeher =

Minority language of Senegal

- Baïnounk Gubëeher
- Native to: Senegal
- Native speakers: <1,000 (2011, Gubeeher proper)
- Language family: Niger–Congo?: Atlantic–Congo; Senegambian; Wolof–Nyun; Nyun-Buy; Banyum; Baïnounk Gubëeher
- Dialects: Gubeeher; Gufangor; Gubelor
- Writing system: Latin script

Language codes
- ISO 639-3: None (mis)
- Glottolog: gube1234
- ELP: Baïnounk Gubëeher

Baïnounk Gubëeher is a minority language of Senegal, whose speakers are concentrated in Djibonker, Casamance.

== Phonology ==
=== Consonants ===
The consonant phonemes of Baïnounk Gubëeher are as follows:

		Labial	Alveolar	Palatal	Velar	Glottal
Nasal		m	n	ɲ	ŋ	
Stop	voiceless	p	t	c	k	
Stop	voiced	b	d	ɟ	ɡ	
Fricative		f	s		x	h
Approximant		w	l	j		
Flap			ɾ			

==== Notes ====
- The phonemic status of geminated consonants is uncertain. There are a few words that have them, but there are no minimal pairs.
- Word-final /ɾ/ can be pronounced as a voiceless uvular trill by some speakers.

=== Vowels ===
The vowel phonemes of Baïnounk Gubëeher are as follows:

	Front		Central		Back	
	short	long	short	long	short	long
Close	i	iː			u	uː
Near-close	ɪ	ɪː			ʊ	ʊː
Close-mid	e	eː	ə	əː	o	oː
Open-mid	ɛ	ɛː	ə	əː	ɔ	ɔː
Open			a	aː		

Length is phonemic for all vowels. The difference between /i, u/ and /ɪ, ʊ/ is hard to perceive, and minimal pairs are rare.

== Bibliography ==
- Cobbinah, Alexander Yao (2013), Nominal classification and verbal nouns in Baïnounk Gubëeher (PDF), University of London
