= Wamey =

Senegambian language spoken in West Africa

- Konyagi
- Native to: Guinea, Senegal
- Ethnicity: Konyagui people
- Native speakers: 38,000 (2014-2015)
- Language family: Niger–Congo?: Atlantic–Congo; Atlantic; Senegambian; Tenda; Wamey

Language codes
- ISO 639-3: cou
- Glottolog: wame1240
- ELP: Wamey
- Location within Africa
- Coordinates: 12°33′N 13°11′W

Wamey (W̃èỹ, Wey, Mey), or Konyagi (Conhague, Coniagui, Koniagui, Koñagi), is a Senegambian language of Senegal and Guinea spoken by the Konyagui people.

== Phonology ==
=== Consonants ===
Wamey consonants
			Bilabial	Alveolar	Palatal	Velar	
			Bilabial	Alveolar	Palatal	plain	labial
Nasal			m	n	ɲ	ŋ	ŋʷ
Plosive	oral	voiceless	p	t	c	k	kʷ
Plosive	oral	voiced	b	d	ɟ	g	gʷ
Plosive	prenasal	voiceless	ᵐp	ⁿt	ᶮc	ᵑk	ᵑkʷ
Plosive	prenasal	voiced	ᵐb	ⁿd	ᶮɟ	ᵑg	
Implosive			ɓ	ɗ	ʄ		
Fricative	voiceless		ɸ	s		x	xʷ
Fricative	voiced		β				
Approximant	oral			l	j		w
Approximant	nasalized			l̃	j̃		w̃
Trill	plain			r			
Trill	retracted (?)			r̠̙			

=== Vowels ===
Wamey vowels
	Front	Central	Back
Close	i		u
Mid	ɛ	ə	ɔ
Open	æ	a	

=== Tone ===
Wamey can be said to exhibit tone-driven epenthesis, a rare phenomenon. This analysis is supported by the fact that certain syllable structures are in complementary distribution.

Tone	Roots with surface [CVCə]	Roots with surface [CVC]
H	*CV́Cə́	[cǽw̃] 'urinating'
L	*CV̀Cə̀	[cæ̀w̃] 'hiding'
HL	*CV́Cə̀	[cæ̂w̃] 'domestic animal'
LH	[ᵑkæ̀w̃ə́] 'dance'	*CV̌C

== Bibliography ==
- Ferry, Marie-Paule (1991). Thesaurus Tenda: Dictionnaire Ethnolinguistique de Langues Sénégalo-Guinéennes (Niyan (Bassari) / Nik (Bedik) / Mey (Konyagi)). Vol. 2. Paris: Peeters. ISBN 978-2-87723-036-0. OCLC 26879955. OL 11042928M.
- Johnston, Harry Hamilton (1919). A Comparative Study of the Bantu and Semi-Bantu Languages. Vol. 2. Oxford: The Clarendon Press. OL 6619219M.
- Rolle, Nicholas; Merrill, John T. M. (2022). "Tone-driven epenthesis in Wamey". Phonology. 39 (1): 113–158. doi:10.1017/S0952675722000094.
- Rolle, Nicholas (2025). "A tonological rarity: Tone-driven epenthesis in Ghomala'". In Kuznetsova, Natalia; Anderson, Cormac; Easterday, Shelece (eds.). Rarities in phonetics and phonology: Structural, typological, evolutionary, and social dimensions. Berlin: Language Science Press. pp. 359–391. doi:10.5281/zenodo.15148178.
- Santos, Rosine (1977). Phonologie et morphotonologie de la langue w̃èỹ (koñagi). Les Langues Africaines au Sénégal. Vol. 69. Dakar: Centre de Linguistique Appliquée de Dakar. OCLC 9186782. BnF 34881214f.
- Santos, Rosine (1996). Le mey: Langue ouest-atlantique de Guinée (PhD thesis). Sorbonne: Université de la Sorbonne Nouvelle (Paris). OCLC 1291721156.
- Wilson, William André Auquier (2007). Storch, Anne (ed.). Guinea Languages of the Atlantic Group: Description and Internal Classification. Schriften zur Afrikanistik. Vol. 12. Frankfurt am Main: Peter Lang. ISBN 978-3-631-55170-7.
