= Stéphane Robert (linguist) =

French linguist

Stéphane Robert is a French linguist based at LLACAN (CNRS) who specializes in Information Structure and cognitive linguistic issues in African languages, especially Atlantic languages.

== Education and research ==
Stéphane Robert received her PhD in 1989 from the Université de Paris VII (félicitations du jury), under the direction of Antoine Culioli, with a dissertation entitled, Système verbal et énonciation en wolof. In 1996 she received her Habilitation (félicitations du jury), at the Université de Paris VII UFR de Linguistique with a Habilitation thesis entitled, Réflexions sur la dynamique du sens et la structuration des énoncés.

Robert has been a researcher at LLACAN (CNRS) since 1992, and has been a Research Director there since 1998. She is best known for her work on the expression of focus in Wolof.

== Honors and awards ==
- 2018 elected to the Academia Europea
- 2013 Chevalier de la Légion d’honneur

== Selected publications ==
Hickman, Maya & Stéphane Robert (eds.). 2006. Space in Languages. Benjamins. DOI: https://doi.org/10.1075/tsl.66

Robert, Stéphane. 1991. Approche énonciative du système verbal: le cas du wolof. Editions du CNRS. ISBN 978-2-222-04479-6

Rialland, Annie & & Stéphane Robert. 2001. The intonational system of Wolof. Linguistics 39, 893–939. https://doi.org/10.1515/ling.2001.038

Robert, Stéphane. 1993. Structure et sémantique de la focalisation. Bulletin de la Société de Linguistique de Paris 88, 25–47.
