= Lebu Wolof =

Language of Senegal related to Wolof

Lebu
- Native to: Senegal
- Ethnicity: Lebu
- Native speakers: lebou
- Language family: Niger–Congo?: Atlantic–Congo; Senegambian; Wolof–Nyun; Lebu

Language codes
- ISO 639-3: None (mis)
- Glottolog: lebu1234

Lebu Wolof (Lebou Oulof) is a language of Senegal that is closely related to, but not mutually intelligible with, Wolof proper. The distinctiveness of the language was obscured by the fact that all Lebu people are bilingual in Wolof. Lebu Wolof is the source of standard Wolof, the national language of Senegal.
