= West Atlantic languages =

Niger–Congo language subgroup of West Africa

West Atlantic
- Atlantic
- (obsolete as a language family, geographic)
- Geographic distribution: Westernmost Africa
- Linguistic classification: Niger–Congo?: Atlantic–Congo; West Atlantic

Language codes
- Glottolog: None

The West Atlantic languages (also the Atlantic languages (Note: "West Atlantic" is the traditional term, following Diedrich Hermann Westermann; "Atlantic" is more typical in recent work, particularly since Bendor-Samuel (1989), but is also used specifically for the northern branch of West Atlantic.) or North Atlantic languages) of West Africa are a typological grouping of Niger–Congo languages.

The Atlantic languages are spoken along the Atlantic coast from Senegal to Liberia, though transhumant Fula speakers have spread eastward and are found in large numbers across the Sahel, from Senegal to Nigeria, Cameroon and Sudan. Wolof of Senegal and several of the Fula languages are the most populous Atlantic languages, with several million speakers each. Other significant members include Serer and the Jola dialect cluster of Senegal. Temne, a major language of Sierra Leone, was included in the Atlantic subgroup in earlier classifications but in modern proposals, it is no longer grouped within Atlantic.

Most Atlantic languages exhibit consonant mutation and have noun-class systems similar to those of the distantly related Bantu languages. Some languages are tonal, while others such as Wolof have pitch-accent systems. The basic word order tends to be SVO.

== Classification and scope ==
=== Traditional classification ===
The Atlantic family was first identified by Sigismund Koelle in 1854. In the early 20th century, Carl Meinhof claimed that Fula was a Hamitic language, but August von Klingenhaben and Joseph Greenberg's work established Fula's close relationship with Wolof and Serer. W. A. A. Wilson notes that the validity of the family as a whole rests on much weaker evidence, though it is clear that the languages are part of the Niger–Congo family, based on evidence such as a shared noun-class system. However, comparative work on Niger–Congo is in its infancy. Classifications of Niger–Congo, usually based on lexicostatistics, generally propose that the various Atlantic languages are rather divergent, but less so than Mande and other languages that lack noun classes.

David Sapir (1971) proposed a classification of Atlantic into three branches, a northern group, a southern group, and the divergent Bijago language of the Bissagos Islands off the coast of Guinea-Bissau:

- Atlantic
  - Northern
    - Sénégal languages: Fula–Serer; Wolof
    - Cangin languages
    - Bak languages (not including Bijago)
    - Eastern Sénégal–Portuguese Guinea languages
      - Tenda languages
      - Biafada–Pajade
      - Kobiana–Kasanga–Banhum
      - Nalu–Mbulungish–Baga Mboteni
  - Bijago
  - Southern
    - Sua
    - Mel languages (including Gola)
    - Limba

Sapir's classification is widely cited in handbooks on African linguistics (e.g. Bender 1989, Williamson & Blench 2000), and is also used in the Ethnologue (22nd ed., 2019).

=== Recent proposals ===
The unity of the Atlantic languages—as traditionally defined—has long been questioned, e.g. Dalby (1965), who argued for the Mel languages as a primary branch of Niger–Congo. At the current state of research, the wide concept of Atlantic (i.e. including the Southern languages) within the Niger–Congo family is no longer held up.

Segerer (2010, 2016) and Pozdniakov & Segerer (2017) propose a narrowed-down version of the Atlantic languages by excluding all languages of the southern branch, which they treat as four primary branches (viz. Sua, Limba, Gola, and the Mel languages) within the Niger–Congo family. The Bak languages are split from the northern languages as a coordinate subbranch within Atlantic (in the narrow sense). Bijago is assigned to the Bak languages.

Güldemann (2018) goes even further, and also treats Nalu and Mbulungish–Baga Mboteni ("Rio Nunez") as unclassified first-order branches of Niger–Congo.

==== Vossen & Dimmendaal (2020) ====
Revised classification of the Atlantic languages (Vossen & Dimmendaal 2020:166, from Pozdniakov & Segerer):

- Atlantic
  - North
    - Wolof: Wolof, Lebu
    - Nyun-Buy
      - Nyun (Gunyaamolo, Gujaher, Gubëeher, etc.)
      - Buy (Kasanga, Kobiana)
    - Tenda-Jaad
      - Tenda: Basari, Tanda, Bedik, Bapen; Konyagi
      - Jaad: Biafada; Badiaranke
    - Fula-Sereer
      - Fula (Pular, Pulaar, Fulfulde, etc.)
      - Sereer
    - Cangin
      - Palor, Ndut
      - Noon, Laala, Saafi
    - Nalu
      - Nalu
      - Bage Fore
      - Baga Mboteni
  - Bak
    - Balant: Ganja, Kentohe, Fraase
    - Joola-Manjaku
      - Joola: Fogny, Banjal, Kasa, Kwaatay, Karon, Ejamat, Keeraak, etc.; Bayot ?
      - Manjaku
      - Bok, Cur, Bassarel
      - Pepel
      - Mankanya
    - Bijogo: Kamona, Kagbaaga, Kajoko

==== Merrill (2021) ====
Merrill (2021) proposes that Atlantic (or North Atlantic) is not a valid subgroup of Niger-Congo, but rather considers each of the established Atlantic "branches" to all be primary branches of Niger-Congo. Furthermore, Merrill suggests that due to the divergence of the Atlantic languages, the homeland of Niger-Congo may lie in the northwest of sub-Saharan Africa.

- North Atlantic geographical area
  - Fula-Sereer (branch)
    - Fula
    - Sereer
  - Cangin
  - Wolof
  - Bainunk-Kobiana-Kasanga (branch)
    - Kobiana
    - Gujaher
    - Gubëeher
    - Guñaamolo
  - Biafada-Pajade (branch)
    - Pajade
    - Biafada
  - Tenda (branch)
    - Konyagi
    - Bassari
    - Bedik
  - Bak (branch)
    - Joola
    - Manjak
    - Balanta
  - Bijogo (branch)

Merrill (2021) also notes that Tenda and Biafada-Pajade share similarities with each other, and may possibly form a linkage.

== Reconstruction ==
Proto-Atlantic lexical innovations reconstructed by Pozdniakov & Segerer (2017):

Gloss	Proto-Atlantic
star	*kʷʊʈ
to fly	*yiiʈ
to die	*keʈ
to rot	*pʊʈ
three	*taʈ
eye	*giʈ
liver	*heɲ
feather	*lung
hair	*wal
baobab	*bak ~ *ɓak
to see	*jok (?)
tree trunk	*dik
to give birth	*was / *bas

Wilson (2007:36) also proposed the tentative Proto-Atlantic reconstructions:

Gloss	Proto-Atlantic
head	*kop
ear	*nop
eye	*kit
mouth	*tum

Sample Atlantic cognate sets:

Language	‘eye’	‘liver’	‘feather’	‘hair’	‘baobab’	‘to see’	‘tree trunk’	‘to give birth’
Proto-Atlantic	*giʈ	*heɲ	*lung	*wal	*b/ɓak	*jok?	*dik	*w/bas
Tenda-Jaad	*gəɬ	*ceeɲ	*dɔ̰̀ngw	*mbal	ɓak	jeek?		*bas
Fula-Sereer	*git	xeeɲ		wiil	ɓaak/ɓok	jak	lek-	ɓas-il
Nyun-Buy	*giɬ	kɩɩɲ	lung		bɔk	njug?	leex/rien	bɔs
Wolof	-ət		dung	*-war		jàkk		wəs-in
Cangin	*ʔəɬ	*kɛɛɲ			ɓaʔ/ɓɔh		*dik	ɓəs
Nalu	cet				bɛɛk	yɛk	dik/lik	
Joola	kiɬ	hɩɩɲ		*wal	bak	jʊk	nʊk-an	βɔs
Manjak	*kiɬ	*-ɩɲ	lung	*wɛl	bak	jʊk		bas
Balant	*kít/git	hɩ́ɩ́ɲɛ̰̀		wul/hul			ndíŋá/ndiik	
Bijogo	ŋɛ		runk-	wa		joŋ	nik-an	-gbʸa

Reconstructions for individual West Atlantic branches can be found in Merrill (2021).

== Numerals ==
Comparison of numerals in individual languages:

Classification	Language	1	2	3	4	5	6	7	8	9	10
Senegambian, Serer	Sereer-Sine (1)	leŋ	ƭik	tadik	nahik	ƥetik	ɓetaa fo leŋ (5 + 1)	ɓetaa ƭak (5 + 2)	ɓetaa tadak (5 + 3)	ɓetaa nahak (5 + 4)	xarɓaxaay
Senegambian, Serer	Serer-Sine (2)	leŋ	ɗik	tadik	nahik	ɓedik	ɓetuː fa leŋ (5 + 1)	ɓetuː ɗik (5 + 2)	ɓetuː tadik (5 + 3)	ɓetuː nahik (5 + 4)	xarɓaxay
Senegambian, Fula-Wolof	Wolof	bɛn:	ɲaːr	ɲɛtː	ɲɛnt	dʒuroːm	dʒuroːm bɛn: (5 + 1)	dʒuroːm ɲaːr (5 + 2)	dʒuroːm ɲɛtː (5 + 3)	dʒuroːm ɲɛnt (5 + 4)	fukː
Senegambian, Fula-Wolof	CE Niger Fulfulde	ɡɔ́ʔɔ̀	ɗíɗi	tátì	náì	ɟóè	ɟóé ɡɔ̀l (5 + 1)	ɟóé ɗìɗi (5 + 2)	ɟóé tátì (5 + 3)	ɟóé náì (5 + 4)	sáppò
Senegambian, Fula-Wolof	Western Niger Fulfulde	ɡoʔo	ɗiɗi	tati	naj	d͡ʒoj	d͡ʒeeɡom (5 + 1)	d͡ʒeɗɗi (5 + 2)	d͡ʒeetati (5 + 3)	d͡ʒeenaj (5 + 4)	sappo
Senegambian, Fula-Wolof	Adamawa Fulfulde	ɡoʔo	ɗiɗi	tati	naj	d͡ʒowi	d͡ʒoweːɡo (5 + 1)	d͡ʒoweːɗiɗi (5 + 2)	d͡ʒoweːtati (5 + 3)	d͡ʒoweːnaj (5 + 4)	sappo
Senegambian, Fula-Wolof	Fulfulde Maasina	ɡoʔo	ɗiɗi	tati	naj	d͡ʒoj	d͡ʒeːɡom (5 + 1)	d͡ʒeɗ:i (5 + 2)	d͡ʒet:i (5 + 3)	d͡ʒeːnaj (5 + 4)	sap:o
Senegambian, Fula-Wolof	Pular	ɡooto / ɡoo	ɗiɗi	tati	naj	d͡ʒowi	d͡ʒeeɡo (5 + 1)	d͡ʒeeɗiɗi (5 + 2)	d͡ʒeetati (5 + 3)	d͡ʒeenaj (5 + 4)	sappo
Senegambian, Fula-Wolof	Pulaar	ɡoo	ɗiɗi	tati	naj	d͡ʒoj	d͡ʒeeɡom (5 + 1)	d͡ʒeeɗiɗi (5 + 2)	d͡ʒeetati (5 + 3)	d͡ʒeenaj (5 + 4)	sappo
Eastern Senegal-Guinea, Banyun	Baïnounk Gubëeher	-nduk	-na:k	-lal:	-rendek	cilax (lit: hand)	cilax aŋɡa -nduk	cilax aŋɡa -na:k	cilax aŋɡa -lal:	cilax aŋɡa -rɛndɛk	ha:lax (litː feet)
Eastern Senegal-Guinea, Banyun	Gunyaamolo Banyun (1)	uŋɡonduk	hanakk	halall	harɛnɛk	hɐməkila	hɐməkila iŋɡi uŋɡonduk	hɐməkila iŋɡi hanakk	hɐməkila iŋɡi halall	hɐməkila iŋɡi harɛnɛk	haala (litː hands)
Eastern Senegal-Guinea, Banyun	Gunyaamolo Banyun (2)	-duk	-nak	-lall	-rɛnɛk	-məkila	-məkila iŋɡi -duk (5 + 1)	-məkila iŋɡi -nak (5 + 2)	-məkila iŋɡi -lall (5 + 3)	-məkila iŋɡi -rɛnɛk (5 + 4)	ha-lah (litː hands)
Eastern Senegal-Guinea, Nun	Kasanga (Cassanga)	-tɛɛna	-naandiid	-taar	-sannaʔ	jurooɡ	jurooɡ -tɛɛna (5 + 1)	jurooɡ -naandiid (5 + 2)	ɡasansanna (cf. 'four')	jurooɡ -sannaʔ (5 + 4)	ŋaarooɡ (litː 'fives')
Eastern Senegal-Guinea, Nun	Kobiana	-tee(na)	-naŋ	-teeh	-sannaŋ	jurooɡ	jurooɡ -tee(na) (5 + 1)	jurooɡ -tee(na) + ? (5 + 1 + x)	sannaŋ sannaŋ (4 + 4)	sannaŋ sannaŋ + ? (4 + 4 + x)	ntaajã
Eastern Senegal-Guinea, Tenda	Badyara	painɛ / pakkã	maae	mat͡ʃaw	manne	kobəda	kobəda ŋka-inɛ (5 + 1)	kobəda ŋka maae (5 + 2)	kobəda ŋka mat͡ʃaw (5 + 3)	kobəda ŋka manne (5 + 4)	pappo
Eastern Senegal-Guinea, Tenda	Oniyan (Bassari)	imɐt	ɓəki	ɓətɐs	ɓənɐx	ɓəɲɟɔ	ɓəɲɟɔŋɡimɐt (5 + 1)	ɓəɲɟɔŋɡəɓəki (5 + 2)	ɓəɲɟɔŋɡəɓətɐs (5 + 3)	ɓəɲɟɔŋɡəɓənɐx (5 + 4)	ɛpəxw
Eastern Senegal-Guinea, Tenda	Biafada (1)	nəmma	bihe	biɟo	bini	ɡəbəda	mpaaɟi	mpaaɟi ŋɡa ɲi (6 + ɲi)	wase	leberebo	bapo
Eastern Senegal-Guinea, Tenda	Biafada (2)	-nnəmma	-ke	-jo	-nnihi	ɡəbəda	mpaaji	mpaaji nyi (6 + nyi)	wose	liberebo	ba-ppo
Eastern Senegal-Guinea, Tenda	Budik (Tenda)	riye, diye, iye	xi, ki	sas, tas	maxala, maxana	co(nje)	co nɡə iye (5 + 1)	co nɡə xi (5 + 2)	co nɡə sas (5 + 3)	co nɡə maxala (5 + 4)	ipox
Eastern Senegal-Guinea, Tenda	Wamey (Konyagi)	rjɐmpɔ	wɐhi	wɐrɐr	wɐr̃ɐh	mbəɗ	mbəɗ ɡə rjɐw̃ (5 + 1)	mbəɗ ɡə wɐhi (5 + 2)	mbəɗ ɡə wɐrɐr (5 + 3)	mbəɗ ɡə wɐnɐh (5 + 4)	pəhw
Bijago	Bijago (Bijogo)	nɔɔd	n-som	ɲ-ɲɔɔkɔ	ya-aɡɛnɛk	n-deɔkɔ	(n-deɔkɔ) na nɔɔd (5 + 1)	(n-deɔkɔ) ni n-som (5 + 2)	(n-deɔkɔ) ni ɲ-ɲɔɔkɔ (5 + 3)	(n-deɔkɔ) na ya-aɡɛnɛk (5 + 4)	n-ruakɔ
Bak, Balant-Ganja	Balanta-Ganja	-woda	-sibi	-aabí	-tahla	-jíif	faaj	faajinɡooda (6 + 1) ?	taataala (2 x 4) ?	-jíntahla (5 + 4) ?	-jímmin
Bak, Balant-Ganja	Balanta-Kentohe	fho:dn / ho:dn	ksibm	khobm	ktahli	t͡ʃɪf (litː hand)	t͡ʃɪf kə fhdon (5 + 1)	t͡ʃɪf kə ksibm (5 + 2)	t͡ʃɪf kə khobm (5 + 3)	t͡ʃɪf kə ktalhi (5 + 4)	t͡ʃɪːfmɛn (litː whole hands)
Bak, Jola, Bayot	Bayot	ɛndon	tɪɡˑɡa	fɜzɪ	iβɛɪ	oɾɔ (litː 'one hand')	oɾɔ-nenˑdon ('one hand plus one')	oɾɔ-niɾɪɡˑɡa ('one hand plus two')	oɾɔ-nifɛzɪ ('one hand plus three')	oɾɔ-niβɛɪ ('one hand plus four')	ɡʊtˑtɪɛ ('two hands' )
Bak, Jola, Bayot	Senegal Bayot	ɛndon	ɪɾɪɡːə	i'feɟi	ɪ'βɛj	ɔɾɔ (litː 'one hand')	ɔɾɔ nɪ 'ɛndon ('one hand plus one')	ɔɾɔ nɪ 'ɪɾiɡːə ('one hand plus two')	ɔɾɔ nɪ i'feɟi ('one hand plus three')	ɔɾɔ nɪ ɪ'βɛj ('one hand plus four')	ʊ'sɛβɔkɔ ('two hands' )
Bak, Jola, Jola Proper	Bandial	jɐnʊɾ	suːβɐ	si'fʰəʝi	sɪ'bɐɣɪɾ	fʊ'tɔx	fʊ'tɔx nɪ 'jɐnʊɾ (5 + 1)	fʊ'tɔx nɪ 'suːβɐ (5 + 2)	fʊ'tɔx nɪ si'fʰəʝi (5 + 3)	fʊ'tɔx nɪ sɪ'bɐɣɪɾ (5 + 4)	ɣʊ'ɲɛn (litː hands)
Bak, Jola, Jola Proper	Gusilay	janɷr ɷ = ʊ	suuβa	sifːəɟi	sɪbːaɣɪr	fɷtɔx	fɷtɔx nɪ janɷr (5 + 1)	fɷtɔx nɪ suuβa (5 + 2)	fɷtɔx nɪ sifːəɟi (5 + 3)	fɷtɔx nɪ sɪbːaɣɪr (5 + 4)	ɡɷɲɛn (litː hands)
Bak, Jola, Jola Proper	Jola-Fonyi (Dyola) (1)	jəkon	siɡaba	sifeeɡiir	sibaakiir	futɔk	futɔk di jəkon (5 + 1)	futɔk di siɡaba (5 + 2)	futɔk di sifeeɡiir (5 + 3)	futɔk di sibaakiir (5 + 4)	uɲɛn
Bak, Jola, Jola Proper	Jola-Fonyi (Dyola) (2)	jəkon	siɡaba	sifeeɡiir	sibaakiir	futɔk	futɔk di jəkon (5 + 1)	futɔk di siɡaba (5 + 2)	futɔk di sifeeɡiir (5 + 3)	futɔk di sibaakiir (5 + 4)	uɲɛn
Bak, Jola, Jola Proper	Jola-Kaasa	jɐnɔ	sil̥uβə	si'həːɟi	sɪ'bɐkɪː	hʊ'tɔk	hʊ'tɔk lɪ 'jɐnɔ (5 + 1)	hʊ'tɔk lɪ 'sil̥uβə (5 + 2)	hʊ'tɔk lɪ si'həːɟi (5 + 3)	hʊ'tɔk lɪ sɪ'bɐkɪː (5 + 4)	kʊ'ŋɛn (litː hands)
Bak, Jola, Jola Proper	Karon	yɔːnɔːl	susupək	sihəːciːl	sɪpɐːkɪːl	ɪsɐk	ɪsɐk nɪ yɔːnɔːl (5 + 1)	ɪsɐk nɪŋ susupək (5 + 2)	ɪsɐk nɪŋ sihəːciːl (5 + 3)	ɪsɐk nɪŋ sɪpɐːkɪːl (5 + 4)	ŋɐːsʊwɐn susupək
Bak, Jola, Jola Proper	Kwatay (Kwaataay)	hifeeneŋ	kúsuba	kíhaaji	kibaakir	hutok	hutok ni hifeeneŋ (5 + 1)	hutok nu kúsuba (5 + 2)	hutok ni kíhaaji (5 + 3)	hutok ni kibaakir (5 + 4)	sumoŋu
Bak, Manjaku-Papel	Mankanya	ulolɛ̂n	ŋɨ́tɛp	ŋɨ̀wàdʒɛ̀nt	ŋɨbakɨr	kaɲɛn	padʒɨ	nawuloŋ	bakɾɛ̂ŋ	kaɲɛ́ŋkalɔŋ	iɲɛ̂n (litː hands)
Bak, Manjaku-Papel	Papel	o-loŋ	ŋ-puɡus	ŋ-ɟenʂ	ŋ-uakr	k-ɲene	paaɟ	ɟand	bakari	k-ɲeŋ k-loŋ (< 10 - 1 ?)	o-diseɲene
Cangin	Laalaa (Lehar)	wi̘ːno̘ː	kɐnɐk	kɐːhɐj	niːkiːs	jə̘tu̘ːs	jitnɛːnɔː (5 + 1)	jitnɐkɐnɐk (5 + 2)	jitnɐkɐːhɐj (5 + 3)	jitnɐniːkiːs (5 + 4)	dɐːŋkɛh
Cangin	Ndut	yinë [jinə]	ana [ʔana]	éeyë [ʔéeyə]	iniil [ʔiniːl]	iip [ʔiːp]	pëenë [ˈpəːnə] (5 + 1)	paana [ˈpaːna] (5 + 2)	peeye [ˈpeːjɛ] (5 + 3)	payniil [ˈpainiːl] (5 + 4)	sabboo [ˈsabɔː]
Cangin	Noon	ˈwiːnɔ: / ˈwitnɔː	ˈkanak	ˈkaːhaj	ˈnɪkɪːs	ˈjətu̘ːs	jɪtˈnɪːnɔː (5 + 1)	jɪtnaˈkanak (5 + 2)	jɪtnaˈkaːhaj (5 + 3)	jɪtnaˈnɪkɪːs (5 + 4)	ˈdaːŋkah
Cangin	Palor (Falor)	yino	ana	eye	iniil	iip	poyno (5 + 1)	paana (5 + 2)	peeye (5 + 3)	payniil (5 + 4)	saɓo
Cangin	Saafi-Saafi (Safen)	ˈjiːnɔ	ˈkanak̚	ˈkaːhay	ˈniːkis	jaːtus (< 'hand jaːh')	ˌjiːs na ˈjiːno (5 + 1)	ˌjiːs na ˈkanak̚ (5 + 2)	ˌjiːs na ˈkaːhay (5 + 3)	ˌjiːs na ˈniːkis (5 + 4)	ˈndaŋkiaːh
Mbulungish-Nalu	Mbulungish (Baga-Foré)	kiben	ʃidi / tʃidi	ʃitɛt / tʃitɛt	ʃinɛŋ / tʃinɛŋ	susɑ	sɑkben (5 + 1)	sɑkdi (5 + 2)	sɑktɛt (5 + 3)	sɑknɛŋ (5 + 4)	ɛtɛlɛ
Mbulungish-Nalu	Nalu (1)	deːndɪk	bilɛ	paːt	biːnaːŋ	teːduŋ	teːduŋ ti ndeːndɪk (5 + 1)	teːduŋ ti bilɛ (5 + 2)	teːduŋ ti paːt (5 + 3)	teːduŋ ti biːnaːŋ (5 + 4)	tɛːblɛ ~ tɛbɪlɛ
Mbulungish-Nalu	Nalu (2)	deendek	bilɛ	paat	biinaaŋ	teedoŋ	teedoŋ ti mdeendek (5 + 1)	teedoŋ ti bilɛ (5 + 2)	teedoŋ ti paat (5 + 3)	teedoŋ ti biinaaŋ (5 + 4)	tɛɛblɛ
Limba	West-Central Limba	hantʰe	kaaye	kataati	kanaŋ	kasɔhi	kasɔŋ hantʰe (5 + 1)	kasɔŋ kaaye (5 + 2)	kasɔŋ kataati (5 + 3)	kasɔŋ kanaŋ (5 + 4)	kɔɔhi
Limba	East Limba	hantʰe	kale	katati	kanaŋ	kasɔhi	kasɔŋ hantʰe (5 + 1)	kasɔŋ kale (5 + 2)	kasɔŋ katati (5 + 3)	kasɔŋ kanaŋ (5 + 4)	kɔhi
Sua	Mansoanka (Sua)	sɔn	cen	b-rar	b-nan	sɔŋɡun	sɔŋɡun də sɔnsɔn (5 + 1)	sɔŋɡun də mcen (5 + 2)	sɔŋɡun də mbrar (5 + 3)	sɔŋɡun də mnan (5 + 4)	tɛŋi
Mel, Bullom-Kissi	Bullom So(Mani)	nìmbúl	nìncə́ŋ	nìnrá	nìŋnyɔ́l / -nyɔ́l	nìmán	mɛ̀m-búl (5 + 1)	mɛ̀ncə́ŋ (5 + 2)	mɛ̀nrá (5 + 3)	mɛ̀nnyɔ́l (5 + 4)	wàm
Mel, Bullom-Kissi	Sherbro	bul	tɪŋ	ræ	hyo̠l o̠ = French au in aube	mɛn	mɛn-buk (5 + 1)	mɛn-tɪŋ (5 + 2)	mɛn-ra (5 + 3)	mɛn-hyo̠l (5 + 4)	wāŋ
Mel, Bullom-Kissi	Southern Kissi	pìlɛ̀ɛ́	mùúŋ	ŋɡàá	hìɔ́ɔ́lú	ŋùɛ̀ɛ́nú	ŋǒmpûm (5 + 1)	ŋǒmɛ́ú (5 + 2)	ŋǒmáá (5 + 3)	ŋǒmàhìɔ́ɔ́lú (5 + 4)	tɔ́
Mel, Gola	Gola	ɡuùŋ	tìyèe	taai	tiinàŋ	nɔ̀ɔ̀nɔ̀ŋ	nɔ̀ɔ̀nɔ̀ŋ diè ɡuùŋ (5 + 1)	nɔ̀ɔ̀nɔ̀ŋ leè tìyèe (5 + 2)	nɔ̀ɔ̀nɔ̀ŋ leè taai (5 + 3)	nɔ̀ɔ̀nɔ̀ŋ leè tiinàŋ (5 + 4)	zììyà
Mel, Temne, Baga	Baga Mandori	piin	marəm	masaas	maaŋkəlɛɛŋ	kəcaamət	kəcaamtr tiin (5 + 1)	kəcaamtr marəm (5 + 2)	kəcaamtr masaas (5 + 3)	kəcaamtr maaŋkəlɛɛŋ (5 + 4)	ocoo
Mel, Temne, Baga	Baga Sitemu	pin	mɛrɨŋ	maːs / mãs	maŋkɨlɛ	kɨt͡ʃamɨt	t͡ʃamɨtin (5 + 1)	t͡ʃamɨmɛrɨŋ (5 + 2)	t͡ʃamɨmaːs (5 + 3)	t͡ʃamɨmaŋkɨlɛ (5 + 4)	wɨt͡ʃɔ
Mel, Temne, Baga	Landoma	tɛ̀n	mʌ̀rəŋ	mʌ̀sas	mànkᵊlɛ	kəcàmət	kəcʌ̀ntin (5 + 1)	kəcʌ̀ntᵊ mʌ̀rəŋ (5 + 2)	kəcʌ̀ntᵊ̀ mʌ̀sas (5 + 3)	kəcʌ̀ntᵊ mànkᵊlɛ (5 + 4)	pù
Mel, Temne, Temne-Banta	Temne (Themne) (1)	pín	pɨrʌ́ŋ	pɨsas	panlɛ	tamát̪	dukín (5 + 1)	dɛrɨ́ŋ (5 + 2)	dɛsas (5 + 3)	dɛŋanlɛ (5 + 4)	tɔfɔ́t
Mel, Temne, Temne-Banta	Temne (Themne) (2)	pìn	pə̀rə́ŋ	pə̀sàs	pànlɛ̀	tàmàθ	dùkìn (5 + 1)	dɛ̀rə̀ŋ (5 + 2)	dɛ̀sàs (5 + 3)	dɛ̀ŋànlɛ̀ (5 + 4)	tɔ̀fɔ̀t
Mel, Temne, Temne-Banta	Temne (Themne) (3)	p-in	pə-rəŋ	pə-sas	p-aŋlɛ	tamath	tamath rukin (5 + 1)	tamath dɛrəŋ (5 + 2)	tamath rɛsasa (5 + 3)	tamath rɛŋaŋlɛ (5 + 4)	tɔfʌt
