= Kasanga language =

Senegambian language

Kasanga
- Native to: Senegal, Guinea-Bissau
- Native speakers: Perhaps a few elderly speakers (2007)
- Language family: Niger–Congo?: Atlantic–Congo; Atlantic; Senegambian; Wolof–Nyun; Nyun-Buy; Kasanga

Language codes
- ISO 639-3: ccj
- Glottolog: kasa1248
- ELP: Kasanga

- Language: gu-haaca

Kasanga (Cassanga) or Haal is a Senegambian language traditionally spoken in a few villages of Guinea-Bissau. The language is referred to as gu-haaca by its speakers. Speakers are shifting to Mandinka.
