= Senegambian languages =

Branch of Atlantic-Congo languages

Senegambian
- North Atlantic
- Geographic distribution: Mauritania to Guinea
- Linguistic classification: Niger–Congo?: Atlantic–Congo; Senegambian
- Subdivisions: Fula–Wolof (controversial); Bak

Language codes
- Glottolog: nort3146

The Senegambian languages, traditionally known as the Northern West Atlantic, sometimes confusingly referred to in literature as the Atlantic languages, are a branch of Atlantic–Congo languages most commonly spoken in Senegal and neighboring southern Mauritania, The Gambia, Guinea-Bissau, and Guinea. The nomadic Fula people have also spread their languages from Senegal across the western and central Sahel. The most populous unitary language is Wolof, the national language of Senegal, with four million native speakers and millions more second-language users. There are perhaps 13 million speakers of the various varieties of Fula, and over a million speakers of Serer. The most prominent feature of the Senegambian languages is that they are devoid of tone, unlike the vast majority of Atlantic-Congo languages.

== Classification ==
David Sapir (1971) proposed a West Atlantic branch of the Niger–Congo languages that included a Northern branch largely synonymous with Senegambian. However, Sapir's West Atlantic and its branches turned out to be geographic and typological rather than genealogical groups. The only investigation since then, Segerer & Pozdniakov (2010, 2017), removed the Southern Atlantic languages. The remaining (Northern or Senegambian) languages are characterized by a lack of tone. The Serer–Fulani–Wolof branch is characterized by consonant mutation.

- Senegambian
  - Bak languages
  - Fula–Wolof
    - Fula–Serer
      - Fula (Fulani)
      - Serer
    - Tenda–Jaad
      - Tenda
        - Bassari–Bedik
        - Wamey, Bapeng †
      - Jaad (Biafada, Pajade (Badjara))
    - Cangin languages
    - Wolof (incl. Lebu)
    - Nyun
      - Kasanga, Kobiana (Buy)
      - Banyum (Nyun), Baïnounk Gubëeher
    - ? Nalu (Baga Mboteni, Mbulungish, Nalu)

Serer and Fula share noun-class suffixes.

The inclusion of the poorly attested Nalu languages is uncertain.

Several classifications, including the one used by Ethnologue 20, show Fula as being more closely related to Wolof than it is to Serer, due to a copy error in the literature. In particular, Wilson (1989) recreates Sapir (1971) in the text, but the diagram on p.92 is incorrect.

The Max Planck Institute for Evolutionary Anthropology classifies the Senegambian languages under the name North-Central Atlantic in its Glottolog database.

- North‑Central Atlantic
  - Cangin languages
  - Central Atlantic
    - Bak languages
    - Bijogo languages
  - Fula–Sereer
    - Fula languages
    - Sereer
  - Jaad
    - Biafada
    - Jaad-Badyara
  - Naluic
    - Mbulungish
    - Nalu
    - Pukur
  - Tenda
    - Bassari–Bedik–Bapen
      - Bassari-Tanda
      - Bedik–Bapen
        - Bapen
        - Bedik
    - Wamey
  - Wolof–BKK
    - Nyun
      - Bainounk
        - Bainouk-Gunyaamolo-Gutobor
        - Bainounk-Gujaher
        - Gubeeher-Gufangor-Gubelor
        - Northeast Bainounk
      - Buy
        - Kasanga
        - Kobiana
    - Wolofic
      - Gambian Wolof
      - Lebu Wolof
      - Wolof

== Consonant mutation ==
The Senegambian languages are well known for their consonant mutation, a phenomenon in which the initial consonant of a word changes depending on its morphological and/or syntactic environment. In Fula, for example, the initial consonant of many nouns changes depending on whether it is singular or plural:

pul-lo	"Fulani person"	ful-ɓe	"Fulani people"
guj-jo	"thief"	wuy-ɓe	"thieves"

== Noun classes ==
The West Atlantic languages are defined by their noun-class systems, which are similar to those found in other Niger–Congo languages, most famously the Bantu languages. Most West Atlantic, and indeed Niger–Congo, noun-class systems are marked with prefixes, and linguists generally believe that this reflects the proto-Niger–Congo system. The languages of the Fula–Serer branch of Senegambian, however, have noun-class suffixes or combinations of prefixes and suffixes. Joseph Greenberg argued that the suffixed forms arose from independent postposed determiners that agreed with the noun class:

CL-Noun CL-Det → CL-Noun-CL → Noun-CL

== Comparative vocabulary ==
Comparison of basic vocabulary words of the Senegambian languages:

Language	eye	ear	nose	tooth	tongue	mouth	blood	bone	tree	water	name; surname
Wolof	bət / gət	nɔɔp	bakkan	bəny / gəny	lämminy	gemminy	dɛrɛt	yax	garab	ndɔx	tur; sant
Sereer	áŋgît	nɔ̂f	ɔ́nyîs	ányíìny (PL)	ɗélém	ɔdôn	fo ʔɔl ɔla	o hij ola / a kij aka	i ndaxar na / taxar ka	fɔ̂ːfî	
Sine	ṇgid	nɔ̣f	ɲis	ɲiɲ	ɗelɛm	dɔ̣n	foʔyeʔ	kiʔy	ndaxar	fof	gɔ̣̀n
Fula / Pular	yiit-ere / git-e	now-ru / noppi	kin-al / kin-e	nyii-re / nyi’-e	ɗen-gal / -ɗe	hundu-ko / kundu-le; kara-ho	ʔyii ʔy-an	ʔyi-ʔ-al / ʔyiʔ-e	leggal / leɗɗe	ndiy-an / di’e	in-nde / in-ɗe; yettoo-re / gettoo-je
Ndut	ʔil	nœf	ɲin	sis	pɛɾɛm	ɓuk	ɲif	ʔyo	kɪlɪl	mɞlop	tiː
Sili	ʔil	nuf	ɲin	sis	pɛ̣ɾɛm	ɓuq	ɲif	ʔyox	kilik	molop	tʰiː
Safi	xas	nœf	kiɲin	sis	pɛʔdɛm	ŋgup	ɲif	ʔjɔx	kidik	mazup	tik
Lala	kɔs	nɔf	kumun	sis	peɾim	kuː	ɲif	ʔyɔx	kɛdɛk	musu	tɛːk
None	kᵘas	nɔf	kumɞn	siːs	pɛfɛm	ku	ɲif	ʎoh	kɛdɛk	mᵘɔjuʔ	tek
Banhum	ci-gil / i-	ci-nuf / xa-	nyaŋkən / -əŋ	gu-rul / xa-	bu-lemuc / i-	bu-rul / i-	mu-leen	gu-xuun / xa- / ba-, ku-	ci-nɔ / mu-nn	mu-nd / +-əŋ	gu-rɛt / xa-; ci-ram / nya-
Cobiana	si-ggih / nyi-	si-nuf / ŋa-	gu-nyikin / ŋa-	bu-gees / ja-	jaarum / a-	a-cis / ga-s	bu-heeh	gu-maab / ŋa-	u-doʔ / dɛ-	ma-leem	gi-sɛh / ŋa-; gu-mantiinya / ŋa-
Cassanga	si-gir / ga-, nyi-	gu-nuf / ŋɔ-	gu-nyikən / ŋa-	gu-gees / ŋa-	jaalumb / a-	a-cis / ga-s	bi-lɛr	gu-maab / ŋa-	gu-rien / ŋa-	ma-yaab	gu-sɛr / ŋa-; si-mbur / nyi-
Konyagi	ì-ŋkə́r	æ̀-nə̀f / væ̀-	ì-cə̀l / wæ̀-s	Ø-bènyə́ / wæ̀-	Ø-ryə̀w̃ / wæ̀-	Ø-w̃ə̀s / wæ̀-	#-sǽt	Ø-ỹə̀c / wæ̀-	æ̀-tə́x / væ̀-	wə-̀ŋkà	ù-w̃æ̀cə́ / wæ̀-m
Tenda	a-ŋgəz / b+	a-nəv / b+	ɛ-cən / o-z	yiŋga / ɔ-	liw / o-d	e-tey / o-z	ɔ-zat	a-capar / b+	ɛ-təɣ / ɔ-	men (o-class)	ɔ-wac / ɔ-m; zəc / o-c
Bedik	ngəs	ga-nəf / ba-	e-cəl / ma-s	gi-nyaŋga / ma-	i-ɗem / mə-	bə-məš / ma-	ma-yel	ɛ-bɛʔy / Ø-m	ga-t / ba-t	məŋga	yat
Pajade	m-aasa	ko-nufa	nya-sɛnɛ	pe-nnya	pe-deema	pa-mməs	p-wad	pe-jeere	ma-tte	ma-mbe	micc
Biafada	gərä	gə-nəfa	nya-sin / ba+	cede / maa-s	bu-deema	mməsə / maa-m	bwa-hanna	bu-jedä	bu-r / maa-r	ma-mbiya	gə-səttə; gə-gbanyi
