= Badyara language =

Niger–Congo language of West Africa

Badyara
- Jaad
- Pajade
- Native to: Guinea, Guinea-Bissau
- Native speakers: 20,510 (2017–2018)
- Language family: Niger–Congo?: Atlantic–Congo; Atlantic; Senegambian; Fula–Wolof; Tenda; Badyara

Language codes
- ISO 639-3: pbp
- Glottolog: bady1239
- ELP: Badyara
- Tetserret is classified as Severely Endangered by the UNESCO Atlas of the World's Languages in Danger

Badyara is an Eastern Senegal-Guinea language of Guinea and Guinea-Bissau. Variants of the name are Badara, Badian, Badjara, Badyaranké; there are also Jaad, Bigola, Gola, Kanjad [ka-njad(ɛ)]), Pajade, Pajadinka.
