= Tenda people =

Ethnic group in West Africa

The Tenda or Tanda are an ethnolinguistic group living in the southern Senegal, northeastern Guinea-Bissau, and northern Guinea, comprising the Bassari, the Konyagui, the Bedik, and the Badiaranke.

== Etymology ==
Tenda is the Mandinka word for a landing place or wharf, reflecting the Tenda region's historic importance as a river crossing.

== History ==
The Tenda historically occupied much of what is now southeastern Senegal. In particular, the stretch of the Gambia River between the Nieriko and Niokolo Koba was not navigable by water but offered many excellent fords. It was a preferred crossing place for caravans plying the trade routes that linked Kaabu, the Futa Jallon, the states of Senegambia, the gold fields of Bambouk and Bure, and the great Niger River cities such as Djenné.

The area was a major source of slaves from the 1670s to the 1730s.

== Languages ==
Tenda languages
- Geographic distribution: Southern Senegal, northeastern Guinea-Bissau, and northern Guinea
- Linguistic classification: Niger–Congo?: Atlantic–Congo; Senegambian; Fula–Wolof?; Tenda–Jaad?; Tenda languages
- Subdivisions: Bassari; Bedik; Bapeng †; Wamey

Language codes

The Tenda languages are a part of the Senegambian language family.

== Sources ==
- Traditions et changements dans les populations tenda : colloque international : Kédougou (Sénégal Oriental), 9-16 février 1978, Centre de recherches anthropologiques, Musée de l'homme, Paris, 1978, p. 17 (in French)
