= Bassari people =

Ethnic group

Coordinates: 12.5933°N 12.8458°W

The Bassari are an ethnic group who live primarily in Senegal, with some diaspora into Gambia, Guinea and Guinea-Bissau. They are a matrilineal society stratified into different co ed social groups by age. The Bassari speak a Tenda language called o-niyan. They are mainly subsistence farmers growing for self consumption, with fonio being a crop of large importance both to combat climate change and for cultural significance. The majority of the Bassari are animists, and the men take part in the Kore initiation society. Their art is mainly metallurgy, made for both cosmetic decoration and regalia with significance to the initiation society.

== Population ==
The total population is estimated to be 15,000. Most of the Bassari are concentrated on either side of the Senegal-Guinea border southwest of Kedougou, Kédougou Region, which is part of the larger Bassari Country. This area is referred to in French as Pays Bassari, or liyan in the Bassari language. They migrate to the cities and towns of Senegal and Guinea in the dry season in search of wage-labor, using the money they earn to buy household equipment, clothing and other necessary items. Within the Kedougou Region, there are three cultural landscapes divided between the Bassari, the Bedik, and the Fula people. The area of Kedougou inhabited by the Bassari is known as Salemata.

On the Guinean side of the border, the Bassari mainly live in a group of villages collectively referred to as Bokore, which can be translated to "Those of Kore," Kore being the name of the initiation society within the region.

== Cuisine ==
The Bassari are subsistence farmers, growing rice, millet, earth-peas and fonio. Within Bassari Country around 80% of production is for self consumption, as the off season from August to November is harsh agriculturally. The Bassari particularly have been documented to stock pile food for 2–3 years in advance, which also opens up opportunity for market trade with neighboring communities.

The Festival of the Fonio is an annual event used to popularize the usage of fonio as a local crop and food in the Kedougou region. Previous to the festival, fonio was often associated with the poor, so the event serves to legitimize fonio's cultural significance and its usage as an adaption to climate change. The festival is largely thanks to a local Economic Interest Group ran by Adja Aissatou Aya Ndiaye, who has become a cultural hero in the area as someone who gives training to local woman in industry skills. Participants have dubbed her the Queen of the fonio, and the festival serves as a place for political speeches, traditional singing and dances, and the gifting of offerings made to Ndiaye.

== Language ==
The Bassari speak o-niyan, which is a Tenda language. They refer to themselves as a-liyan, pl. be-liyan, which translates to "those of the laterite." While o-niyan is the traditional language of the Bassari people, the Kedougou population is also fluent in Wolof, which is one of the vernacular language between Senegal villages. French is the official language of Senegal, but only educated men are fluent in it. Some training courses have taught some of the women French, but due to structural inequalities most educational opportunities remain inaccessible to women.

== Religion ==
Most of the group are animists, with a significant minority of Christians (both Catholic and Protestant). Very few Bassari are Muslims.

The mythology of the Bassari is centered on the creation god Unumbotte.

To the Bassari male adulthood is defined by entrance into the Bassari sect of the Kore initiation society, which in turn has three distinct levels of adulthood, each lasts six years and has its own initiation process. Initiation into the first stage occurs when a boy is fifteen, in which he is temporarily separated from his family to undergo a symbolic rebirth as an initiate into the society. This rebirth is mythically possible due to an entity known as endaw, which is a formless being that exists as a guttural sound performed by initiates, and this sound is its only mode of existence. Endaw is often represented visually as a leafy mass or a chameleon. Each of the three levels of the society gives initiators access to the roles of masks and kore, which in turn creates six modes of simulated entities.

Kore, along with many other initiation societies were almost destroyed under the Sekou Toure regime of the 1960's. Toure's Militia performed public unmasking ceremonies in front of women and children in order to undermine the cultural relevancy of the society, followed by a beating of the men and burnings of ritual objects.The Bassari tradition however has survived.

== Art ==
The Bassari have a long standing tradition of metallurgy which have been included in European records since the late 19th century. Importing materials through trade with the Coniagui for iron ore and Fula for copper, the Bassari process these metals within their own line of blacksmiths to craft tools and jewelry.

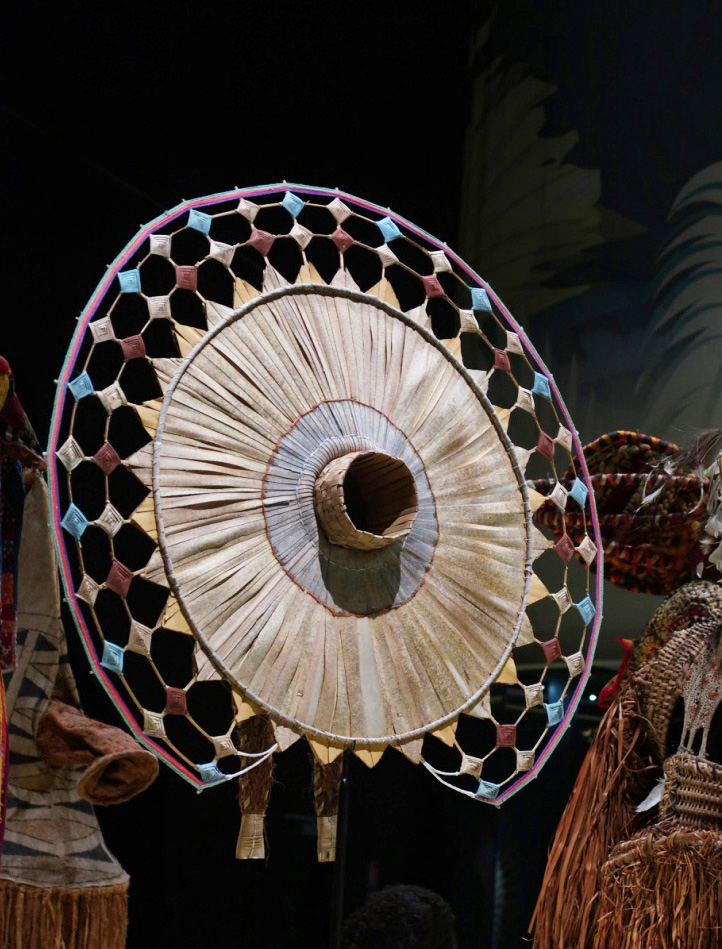
Bassari Initiation Mask

Bassari initiation masks most commonly involve rings of hexagons around a circular center. Though the true meaning behind this motif is a secret held by their initiation society, it is theorized to be symbolic of the hierarchy of knowledge involving the progression of levels within the society. This is deduced by the significance of the number six within Bassari precolonial mathematics, and its relationship to the Bassari calendar as well as divination rites.

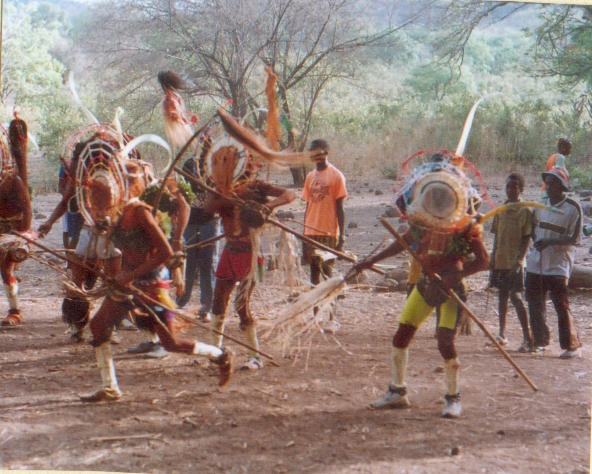
Bassari Initiation Masks being worn in context

Bassari dancers often employ special rattles known as Bamboyo. Each Bamboyo is composed of twenty plaited capsules, with each capsule being folded in an antiprism using a single palm leaf.
