= Unumbotte =

Creator God of the Bassari people of Guinea-Bissau, Senegal, Guinea and The Gambia

Unumbotte is the creator god of the Bassari people in Senegal, the Gambia, Guinea and Guinea-Bissau.

The creation story of Unumbotte is a variation on the Garden of Eden. In it Unumbotte creates a man, then the animals including an antelope and a snake, and later a woman. He gave the humans seeds and they grew trees and plants, including one bearing red fruit. Unumbotte would eat from the tree every seven days, but the humans would not. Eventually the snake persuaded the humans to eat from the tree, explaining to Unumbotte that they were hungry. Unumbotte thus gave each of the creatures foods to eat, humans had cultivated plants, the antelope had grass, but the snake was given poison and a desire to attack humans.
