= Bedik language =

Senegambian language spoken in Senegal

Bedik
- Ménik
- Native to: Senegal
- Native speakers: 2,500 (2015)
- Language family: Niger–Congo?: Atlantic–Congo; Senegambian; Tenda; Basari–Bedik; Bedik

Language codes
- ISO 639-3: tnr
- Glottolog: bedi1235
- ELP: Ménik

Bedik (Budik, endonym Ménik, Onik), also Banda, is a Senegambian language of Senegal and Guinea spoken by traditional hunter-gatherers. Other names include Bande, Basari du Bandemba, Bedik, Budik, Manik, Münik, Onik, Tandanke, Tenda, Tendanke.

== Writing System ==
Alphabet
A	B	Ɓ	C	D	Ɗ	E	Ë	F	G	H	I	J	K	L	M	N	Ñ	Ŋ	O	P	R	S	Ŝ	T	U	W	Y	Ƴ
a	b	ɓ	c	d	ɗ	e	ë	f	g	h	i	j	k	l	m	n	ñ	ŋ	o	p	r	s	ŝ	t	u	w	y	ƴ
