= Banyun language =

Group of Senegambian languages of Senegal and Guinea-Bissau

Banyun
- Bainouk, Nyun
- Native to: Guinea-Bissau, Senegal
- Ethnicity: Bainuk
- Native speakers: 38,000 (2006–2022)
- Language family: Niger–Congo?: Atlantic–Congo; Atlantic; Senegambian; Wolof–Nyun; Nyun-Buy; Banyun
- Writing system: Latin

Language codes
- ISO 639-3: Variously: bcz – Bainouk-Gunyaamolo bab – Bainouk-Gunyuño bcb – Bainouk-Samik (duplicate code)
- Glottolog: bain1264
- ELP: Bainouk-Gunyaamolo; Baïnounk Gujaher
- Bainouk-Gunyaamolo is classified as Vulnerable and Bainouk-Samik is classified as Severely Endangered by the UNESCO Atlas of the World's Languages in Danger.

- Language: gu-jaaxər

Banyun (Banyum), Nyun, or Bainouk, is a Senegambian language group of around 8 closely related languages in Senegal and Guinea-Bissau.

Spellings are Bagnoun, Banhum, Banyung and Bainuk, Banyuk; other names are Elomay ~ Elunay; for the Gunyaamolo variety Ñuñ or Nyamone, and for Gunyuño Guñuun or Samik. The language is referred to as gu-jaaxər by its speakers.

== Tree ==
- Banyum
  - .
    - Gunyaamolo
    - Gutobor
  - Gujaher
  - .
    - Gubeeher
    - Gufangor
    - Gubelor
  - Northeast Bainounk †

== Varieties ==
There are three varieties of Banyun: Baïnouk-gunyaamolo, Baïnouk Samik, and Baïnouk gunyuño.

- Bainouk-Gunyaamolo is spoken by 30,000 people in 2013. It is spoken in the northern Casamance River area, within a triangle formed by the towns of Bignona, Tobor and Niamone or north of Ziguinchor. It is also spoken in Gambia.
- Baïnouk-Samik is spoken by 1,850 people in 2006. It is found mainly on the left bank of the Casamance River, around Samik and surrounding villages, approximately 20 km east of Ziguinchor.
- Baïnouk-Gunyuño (Bainounk-Gujaher) is spoken by 8,860 people in 2006. It is found in the region of Cacheu and near São Domingos in Guinea-Bissau.

The variety of Bainounk spoken in southern Gambia and the north and northeast areas of Casamance appears to have gone extinct, or is at best only remembered by a few elderly people. Glottolog terms this variety "Northeast Bainounk".
