= Kobiana language =

Senegambian language

Kobiana
- Native to: Senegal, Guinea-Bissau
- Native speakers: 1,300 (2017-2018)
- Language family: Niger–Congo?: Atlantic–Congo; Atlantic; Senegambian; Wolof–Nyun; Nyun-Buy; Kobiana

Language codes
- ISO 639-3: kcj
- Glottolog: kobi1241
- ELP: Kobiana

- Language: gu-boy

Kobiana (Cobiana) or Buy (Uboi) is a Senegambian language spoken in several villages of Senegal and Guinea-Bissau. The language is referred to as gu-boy by its speakers. Speakers are shifting to Mandinka.
