= Kids Code Jeunesse =

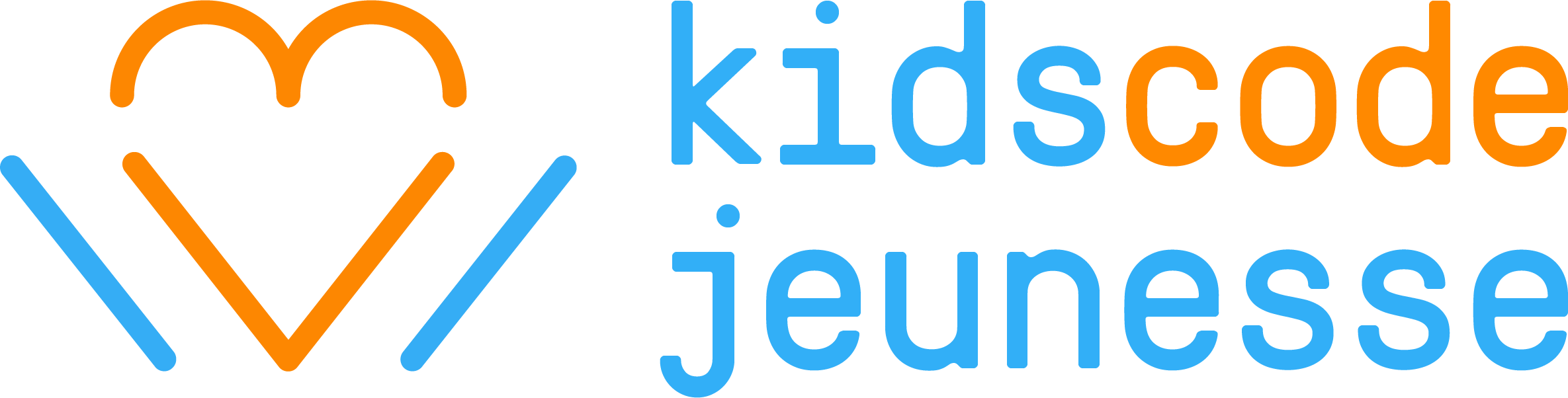
- Industry: Education
- Founded: 2013; 13 years ago in Montréal, Québec, Canada
- Founder: Kate Arthur
- Headquarters: Montréal, Canada
- Area served: Canada
- Products: art:bit
- Brands: Code Club Canada
- Services: Training; Workshops; Education
- Website: kidscodejeunesse.org

Kids Code Jeunesse (KCJ) rebranded to Digital Moment in 2022, is a Canadian (not for profit) organization based in Montreal, Quebec, which helps youth in Canada have an opportunity to learn AI literacy, computational thinking, and coding. The organization was founded in 2013.

== Projects ==
=== Code Club ===
In 2016, in partnership with Code Club U.K., KCJ licensed the rights to Code Club Canada, which runs volunteer-led Code Clubs for free across Canada. There are now over 750 Code Clubs registered throughout every province and territory. These clubs are run for children aged 7–12 in schools, libraries, and community centers for 8 weeks.

=== Code Create Teach ===
In 2016, Kids Code Jeunesse, in partnership with Lighthouse Labs, embarked on a national campaign to inspire teachers to incorporate the basics of coding and computational thinking into their classrooms. From April to December 2018, KCJ hosted a free, full-day Code Create Teach workshops which provided K-12 educators with the tools to help them teach their students how to experiment with technology. Two workshops were planned for each Canadian province and territory, allowing KCJ to reach over 1500 teachers. During the workshops, KCJ instructors provided tips and guidelines to bring coding into the classroom, as well as combine unplugged activities with hands-on coding activities. These methods gave attendees the opportunity to connect with other teachers in purposeful and learner-driven way. Following the Code Create Teach workshops, each teacher was given a free classroom kit of micro:bits, a pocket-sized programmable micro-controller designed to make learning and teaching code easy and fun.

=== Code MTL ===
In 2017, KCJ was contracted for CodeMTL, a project to deliver coding workshops to over 65 schools in the Commission Scolaire de Montréal, Quebec's largest school board.

=== CanCode ===
In January 2018, the Honourable Navdeep Bains, Canada's Minister of Innovation, Science and Economic Development announced that Kids Code Jeunesse was one of the recipients of the inaugural CanCode program. This program is part of the Canadian Government's Innovation and Skills Plan which has the stated intention to invest $50 million by March 2019 to increase the opportunities for children and teachers to master digital skills. With the funds received, Kids Code Jeunesse has been able to extend the training it provides to Canada's youth and aims to support over 70,000 children and 2000 teachers.
