= Bassari language =

Senegambian language of Senegal and Guinea

Basari
- Oniyan
- oniyan
- Native to: Guinea, Senegal
- Ethnicity: Bassari
- Native speakers: 31,000 (2017)
- Language family: Niger–Congo?: Atlantic–Congo; Atlantic; Senegambian; Tenda; Basari–Bedik; Basari

Official status
- Recognised minority language in: Senegal

Language codes
- ISO 639-3: bsc
- Glottolog: bass1258
- ELP: Bassari

- Person: aliyan
- People: biliyan
- Language: oniyan
- Country: Liyan

Bassari, Basari, or Oniyan (Onian, Onëyan, Ayan, Biyan, Wo) is a Senegambian language of Senegal and Guinea spoken by the Bassari people.

== Writing system ==
This is the writing system of Senegal:

Bassari alphabet
A	B	Ɓ	C	D	Ɗ	E	Ë	F	G	H	I	J	K	L	M	N	Ñ	Ŋ	O	P	R	S	Ŝ	T	U	W	Y	Ƴ
a	b	ɓ	c	d	ɗ	e	ë	f	g	h	i	j	k	l	m	n	ñ	ŋ	o	p	r	s	ŝ	t	u	w	y	ƴ

- ĥ, ŵ, ŷ, or h̃, w̃, ỹ are the consonants h, w, y nasalised.
- When vowels e and o are open, they have the acute accent: é, ó.

This is the writing system of Guinea, which uses the Guinean languages alphabet:

Bassari alphabet (Guinea)
A	B	Ɓ	C	D	Ɗ	Ǝ	E	Ɛ	F	G	Gw	H	Hw	I	J	Ɉ	K	Kw	L	M	N	Nb	Nd	Ng	Ngw	Nj	Ɲ	Ŋ	Ŋw	O	Ɔ	P	R	S	Ʃ	T	U	V	W	Y	Ƴ
a	b	ɓ	c	d	ɗ	ǝ	e	ɛ	f	g	gw	h	hw	i	j	ɉ	k	kw	l	m	n	nb	nd	ng	ngw	nj	ɲ	ŋ	ŋw	o	ɔ	p	r	s	ʃ	t	u	v	w	y	ƴ
