= Sua language =

Niger–Congo language spoken in Guinea-Bissau

Sua
- Mansoanka
- Native to: Guinea-Bissau
- Native speakers: 21,000 (2022)
- Language family: Niger–Congo?: Atlantic–Congo; Sua
- Dialects: Nrenghanan; Nsinghnan; Buntchan; Mneliman
- Writing system: Latin

Language codes
- ISO 639-3: msw
- Glottolog: mans1259
- ELP: Mansoanka

Sua, also known by other ethnic groups as Mansoanka or Kunante, is a divergent Niger–Congo language spoken in the Mansôa area of Guinea-Bissau.
