= Konyagui people =

Ethnic group of Senegal, The Gambia and Guinea

Konyagui
Total population
- 18,000

Regions with significant populations
- Senegal: 14000
- Guinea: 4000

Languages
- Wamey language

Religion
- Catholicism, African traditional religion

The Konyagui or Konyaji are an ethnic group native to eastern Senegal and northern Guinea. They refer to themselves as Mey, and their language as Wamey.

Historically they lived throughout what is now the Tambacounda region, and were conquered and persecuted by the Mandinka Kingdom of Wuli. In recent decades many of the remaining Koyaguis have emigrated from the Youkounkoun area of Guinea to Senegal to work and remained there. Konyaguis tend to hold on to their religious traditions, although many have converted to Catholicism.
