= Atlantic–Congo languages =

Major division of the Niger–Congo language family

Atlantic–Congo
- Geographic distribution: Africa
- Linguistic classification: Niger–Congo?: Atlantic–Congo
- Subdivisions: ?Talodi–Heiban (Kordofanian); Senegambian (Atlantic); Nalu (Atlantic); Rio Nunez (Atlantic); Mel (Atlantic); Sua (Atlantic); Gola (Atlantic); Limba (Atlantic); Volta–Congo

Language codes
- ISO 639-5: alv
- Glottolog: atla1278
- The Atlantic–Congo languages shown within the Niger–Congo language family. Non-Atlantic–Congo languages are greyscale.

The Atlantic–Congo languages make up the largest demonstrated family of languages in Africa. They have characteristic noun class systems and form the core of the Niger–Congo family hypothesis. They comprise all of Niger–Congo apart from Mande, Dogon, Ijoid, Siamou, Kru, the Katla and Rashad languages (previously classified as Kordofanian), and perhaps some or all of the Ubangian languages. Hans Gunther Mukanovsky's "Western Nigritic" corresponded roughly to modern Atlantic–Congo.

In the infobox, the languages that appear to be the most divergent are placed at the top. The Atlantic branch is defined in the narrow sense (as Senegambian), while the former Atlantic branches Mel and the isolates Sua, Gola and Limba are split out as primary branches; they are mentioned next to each other because there is no published evidence to move them; Volta–Congo is intact apart from Senufo and Kru.

Glottolog, based primarily on Güldemann (2018), has a more limited evaluation of what has been demonstrated to be Atlantic–Congo, consisting basically of Volta–Congo and erstwhile West Atlantic:

- Atlantic–Congo
  - Gola
  - Limba
  - Sua (Mansoanka)
  - Mel
  - Senegambian (North-Central Atlantic)
  - Volta–Congo

Pεrε, Mprε and Aproumu Aizi appear to be Atlantic–Congo or more specifically Volta–Congo but otherwise remain unclassified within the family.

In addition, Güldemann (2018) lists the West Atlantic languages Nalu and Rio Nunez as unclassified languages within Niger-Congo.

There are a few poorly attested languages, such as Bayot and Bung, which may prove to be additional branches.

== Comparative vocabulary ==
Sample basic vocabulary for reconstructed proto-languages of different Atlantic–Congo branches:

| Branch | Language | eye | ear | nose | tooth | tongue | mouth | blood | bone | tree | water | eat | name |
|---|---|---|---|---|---|---|---|---|---|---|---|---|---|
| "Western Nigritic" (roughly Atlantic–Congo) | Proto–Western Nigritic | *-nín-, *-nínu | *-thúi, *-thú- | *-míl-, *-míla | *-nín- (*-níghin-) | *-líma (*-líami); *-lélum- (*-lúm-) | *-níana; *-níuna (*-núa) | *-ghìá; *-kàl- | *-khwúpà | *-tí | *-lingi | *di- | *-ghínà |
| Benue–Congo | Proto-Benue–Congo | *-lito | *-tuŋi | *-zua | *-nini, *-nino; *-sana; *-gaŋgo | *-lemi; *-lake | | *-zi; *-luŋ | *-kupe | *-titi; *-kwon | *-izi; *-ni | | *-zina |
| Bantu | Proto-Bantu | *i=jíco | *kʊ=tʊ́i | *i=jʊ́lʊ | *i=jíno; *i=gego | *lʊ=lɪ́mi | *ka=nʊa; *mʊ=lomo | *ma=gilá; *=gil-a; *ma=gadí; *=gadí; *mʊ=lopa; *ma=ɲínga | *i=kúpa | *mʊ=tɪ́ | *ma=jíjɪ; *i=diba (HH?) | *=lɪ́ -a | *i=jína |
| Yoruboid | Proto-Yoruboid | *é-jú | *é-tí | *ímṵ́ | *éŋḭ́ | Yor. ahá̰ | *ɛ́lṵ ? | *ɛ̀-gyɛ̀ | *égbṵ́gbṵ́ | Yor. igi | *ó-mḭ | *jɛṵ | *órú- ? |
| Gbe | Proto-Gbe | | *-tó | | *aɖú | *-ɖɛ́ | *-ɖũ; *-ɖũkpá | *-ʁʷũ | *-χʷú | *-tĩ́ | *-tsĩ | *ɖu | *yĩ́kɔ́ |
| Gur | Proto–Central Gur | | | *me (Oti-Volta, Gurunsi) | *ye (Gurunsi, Kurumfe) | | | *ñam, *ñim (Oti-Volta, Kurumfe) | *ʔob, *ʔo | *tɪ (Oti-Volta, Gurunsi) | *ni, *ne; *nã (Oti-Volta, Gurunsi) | *di | *yɪɗ, *yɪd (Oti-Volta, Gurunsi) |
| Gbaya | Proto-Gbaya | *gbà.l̥í/l̥í | *zɛ̀rà | *zɔ̰̀p | *ɲín | *léɓé ~ lémbè | *nú | *tɔ̀k | *gbà̰là̰ | *l̥ì | *tè | *ɲɔŋ/l̥i | *l̥ín ~ l̥íŋ |
