= Languages of Senegal =

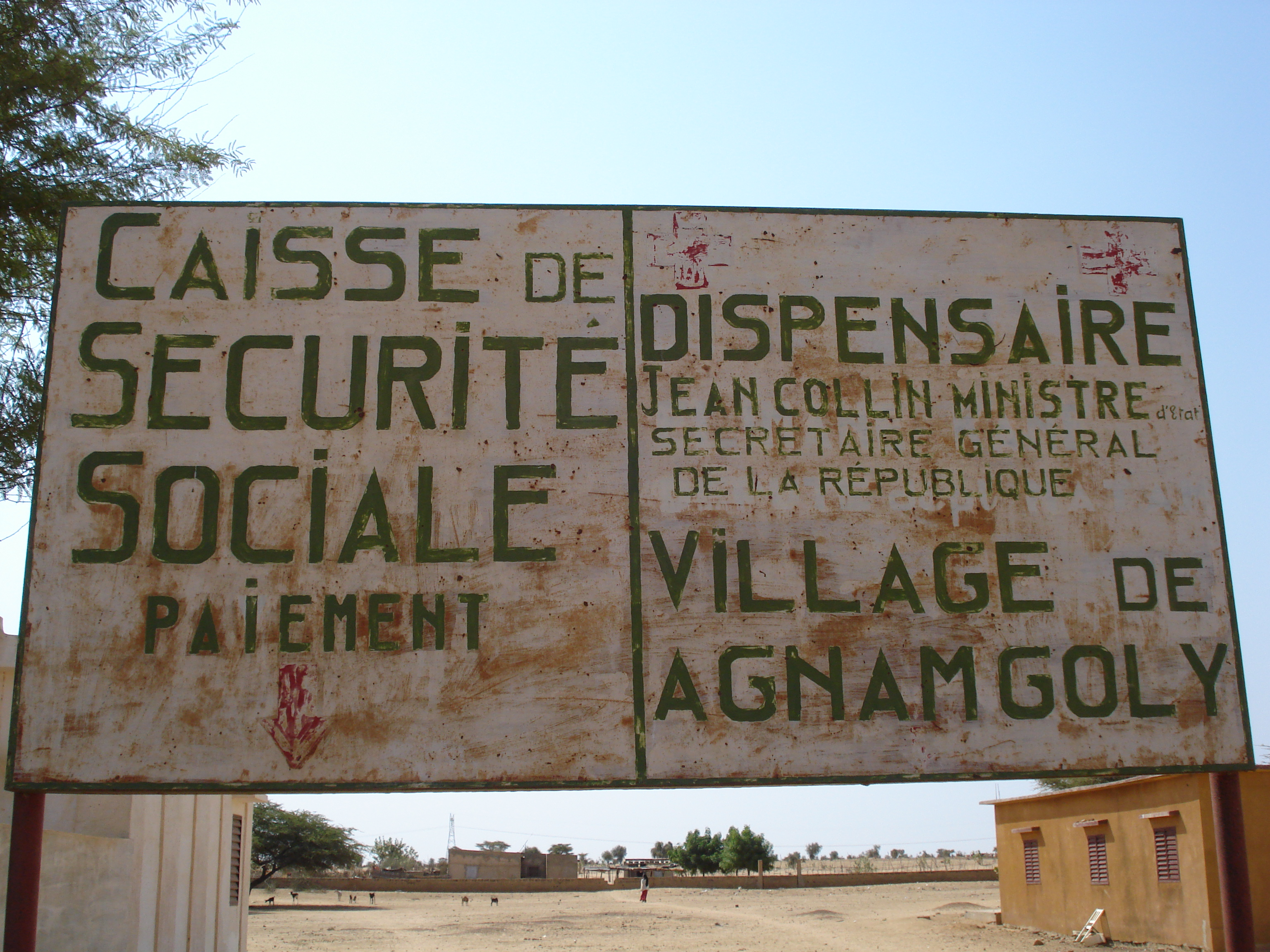
- French in use on an official sign in Agnam-Goly
- Official: French
- National: Wolof, Balanta-Ganja, Jola-Fonyi, Mandinka, Mandjak, Mankanya, Noon, Pulaar, Serer, Soninke
- Vernacular: Wolof
- Minority: Bambara, Bandial, Bapeng, Bassari, Bayot, Bedik, Dyula, Gusilay, Jola-Felupe, Karon, Kasa, Kassonke, Kobiana, Laalaa, Maninka, Ndut, Palor, Safen
- Foreign: English, Arabic, Creole
- Signed: Francophone African Sign Language
- Keyboard layout: AZERTY, Arabic keyboard

Principally-used languages in Senegal according to the 2023 Census
Languages	percent
Wolof	53.5%
Pulaar	26.3%
Serer	9.6%
Joola	2.8%
Mandinka	2.8%
French	0.6%
Balanta	0.4%
Mandjak	0.4%
Signed languages	0.3%
Note: These numbers represent respondents' single most used language, not all languages they know.

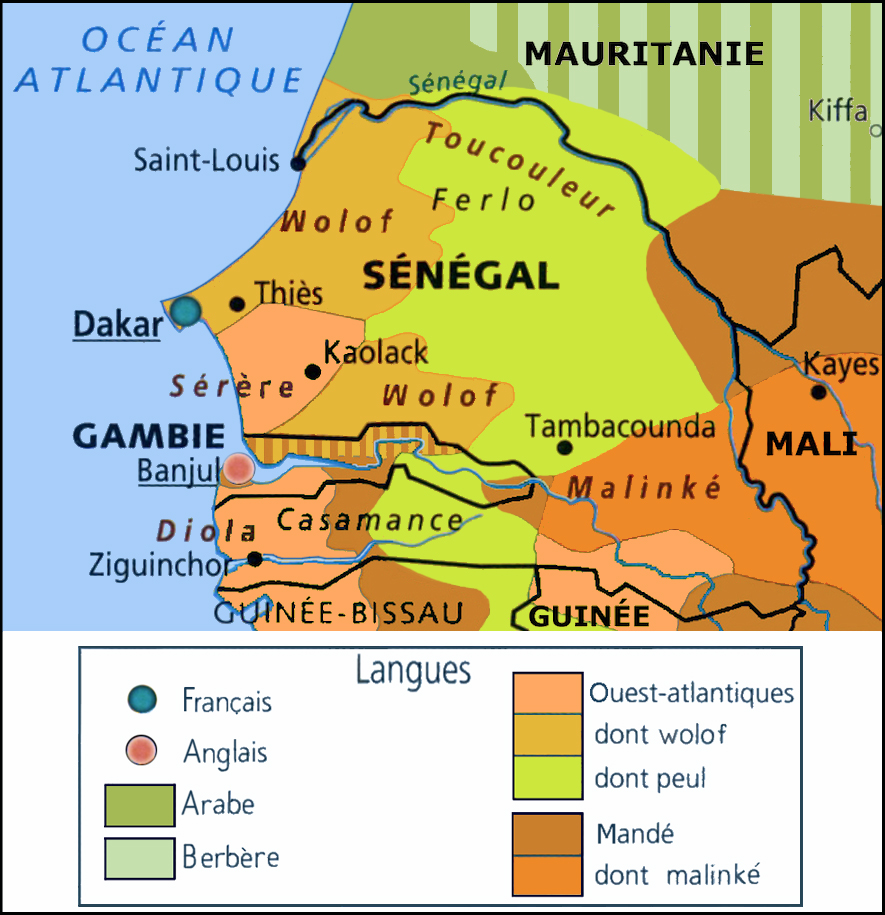
Ethnolinguistic map of Senegal

Senegal is a multilingual country: Ethnologue lists 36 languages. French is the official language of Senegal, though it is uncommon as a first language. The Senegalese constitution explicitly lists six African languages as "national languages", and 25 are officially recognized by the government. Wolof is by far the most widely used language (53.5% of Senegalese people use it as their primary language), followed by Pulaar and French, each used by around 26% of the population.

== Official language ==
French is the only official language of Senegal, though it is only spoken by 26% of the total population. Less than 1% of the population report using French as their main language of communication.

The French language took on an important role in Senegal during the French colonization of West Africa as a junction between European France and its colonies in West Africa. The expansive colony of French West Africa was founded in 1895, with its capital in Senegal. African residents of French West Africa were only eligible for French citizenship if they lived in one of the four major cities of Senegal (the Four Communes) and if they adopted the French language and culture. Thus, Senegal developed a small elite class of French-speaking Senegalese.

After independence, the first President of Senegal, Léopold Sédar Senghor, maintained close ties with France. French was chosen as the official language in part to strengthen the bonds with other newly-independent Francophone African countries and the worldwide community, where French held more sway than the African languages did.

Some of the local political elite pushed for the use and promotion of African languages instead of French, especially the most broadly spoken language in Senegal, Wolof. Despite this, the first Constitution of Senegal formally recognized French as the official language within Article 1. Some African languages would eventually be given a constitutional position as "national languages" beginning in 1978, but this has always represented a secondary position to French.

Senegal is a member state of the Organisation internationale de la Francophonie. Former Senegalese president Abdou Diouf headed the OIF after his time as president.

The Senegalese constitution mandates that all candidates for the presidency of Senegal must be fluent in French. As of 2024, education, written media, and TV are predominantly in French, though radio programs generally use Wolof.

== National languages ==
The term national languages (French: langues nationales) refers to a constitutionally-specified class of languages. In the 1978 constitution, six languages were granted this status: Diola (or Joola/Jola), Mandinka, Pulaar, Serer, Soninke, and Wolof.

A 2001 change to the constitution expanded this status to cover these six languages, plus other indigenous languages that had been "codified". Languages are considered codified if their ethnolinguistic communities meet certain criteria for the language's use and the language has been adequately documented, including an official orthography for the language. As of 2023, 25 indigenous languages have been recognized by Senegal's Directorate of Literacy and National Languages, and 22 of them have been codified.

One analysis of Senegalese language use lists the 25 recognized languages, but does not specify which three of them are not yet codified: Wolof, Pulaar, Séréer, Joola, Malinke, Soninke, Noon, Balant, Oniyan, Mankaañ, Ndut, Mënik, Manjaku, Paloor, Woomey, Bayot, Kanjad, Saaf-saafi, Laalaa, Jalunga, Guñuun, Hasanya, Turka, Susu, Papel.

Despite the official recognition, the national languages are not official governmental languages, and the legal meaning of the category is vague. The lack of support for these national languages compared to French, the sole official language of Senegal, has led critics to complain that the term represents little more than token recognition of the languages.

In 2015, the Senegalese ministry of education adopted a policy for bilingual education based on these national languages, which was supported by the creation of a new position within the government focused on education and training via the national languages in 2020. The implementation of a bilingual education system was beginning as of 2023. Adult literacy programs using the national languages have been undertaken since the early 1990s.

=== Wolof and Wolofization ===
Wolof is the lingua franca and the most widely spoken language in Senegal. A 2017 study estimated that 90% of Senegalese speak Wolof, with 39% speaking it as their first language. Wolof is especially prominent in the capital, Dakar, with an estimated 95% of the population speaking it. Wolof is a member of the proposed Niger–Congo language family, and is considered part of the Atlantic branch within the family. It shares this branch with 50-60 other languages that extend south along the African coast to Guinea. Many other national languages of Senegal are also Atlantic languages, including Pulaar and Sereer, the second- and third-most widely spoken languages in Senegal.

Wolof's role as a language is outsized compared to the Wolof population of Senegal (around 40%), and has led some other Senegalese ethnic groups to worry about "Wolofization" of the country at the cost of other cultures and languages. For example, when Abdoulaye Wade was elected president in 2000, he proposed that public servants be required to speak Wolof. This proposal was opposed by speakers of the other national languages, especially Pulaar, and was never implemented.

At the same time, some scholars have asked whether Wolof's expansion has not only endangered other languages, but also its own traditional structures. The rapid spread of Wolof may be leading it to hybridize with other languages in ways that simplify its traditional vocabulary and grammatical structures.

=== Other national languages ===
Pulaar is the second most-used language in Senegal. It is part of the Fula language dialect continuum, which stretches throughout West Africa.

Mande languages spoken include Soninke, and Mandinka, spoken in the Casamance region of southern Senegal. Diola (Jola) is also a major language in the Casamance region.

== Other languages ==
A dialect of Guinea-Bissau Creole called Casamance Creole, is also common in Casamance. It is a mixture of Portuguese and other local languages, influenced both by historical Portuguese colonization in Casamance as part of Portuguese Guinea, and ongoing connections with modern Guinea-Bissau, where the Creole is the most widely spoken language. In 2008 Senegal, was admitted as Associate Observer in the Community of Portuguese Language Countries (CPLP).

Education for the deaf in Senegal primarily uses a signed language based on American Sign Language, introduced by the deaf American missionary Andrew Foster. Mbour Sign Language, a village sign language independent of ASL, is also used in the town of M'Bour. Arabic and English are also present in Senegal, as they are major languages in Senegal's neighbors.

== Languages taught at school ==
French is the only official language of education in the Senegalese system, for 96% of public education, and 90% of private education.

English is taught as a subject in secondary school across the country.

== List of Senegalese languages ==
- Arabic
- American Sign Language
- Badyara
- Banyum
- Balanta
- Bandial
- Bassari
- Bayot
- Bedik
- Guinea-Bissau Creole (Casamance Creole dialect)
- French
- French Sign Language
- Fula
- Gusilay
- Hassaniya Arabic
- Jola-Felupe
- Jola-Fonyi
- Kasa
- Karon
- Kassonke
- Kobiana
- Kwatay
- Laalaa
- Mandinka
- Manjak
- Maninka
- Mankanya
- Mbour Sign Language
- Mlomp
- Ndut
- Nko
- Noon
- Palor
- Pulaar
- Pular
- Safen
- Serer
- Soninke
- Wamey
- Wolof
- Yalunka
- Zenaga
