= Jola people =

Ethnic group found in west Africa

Jola
Ajamat
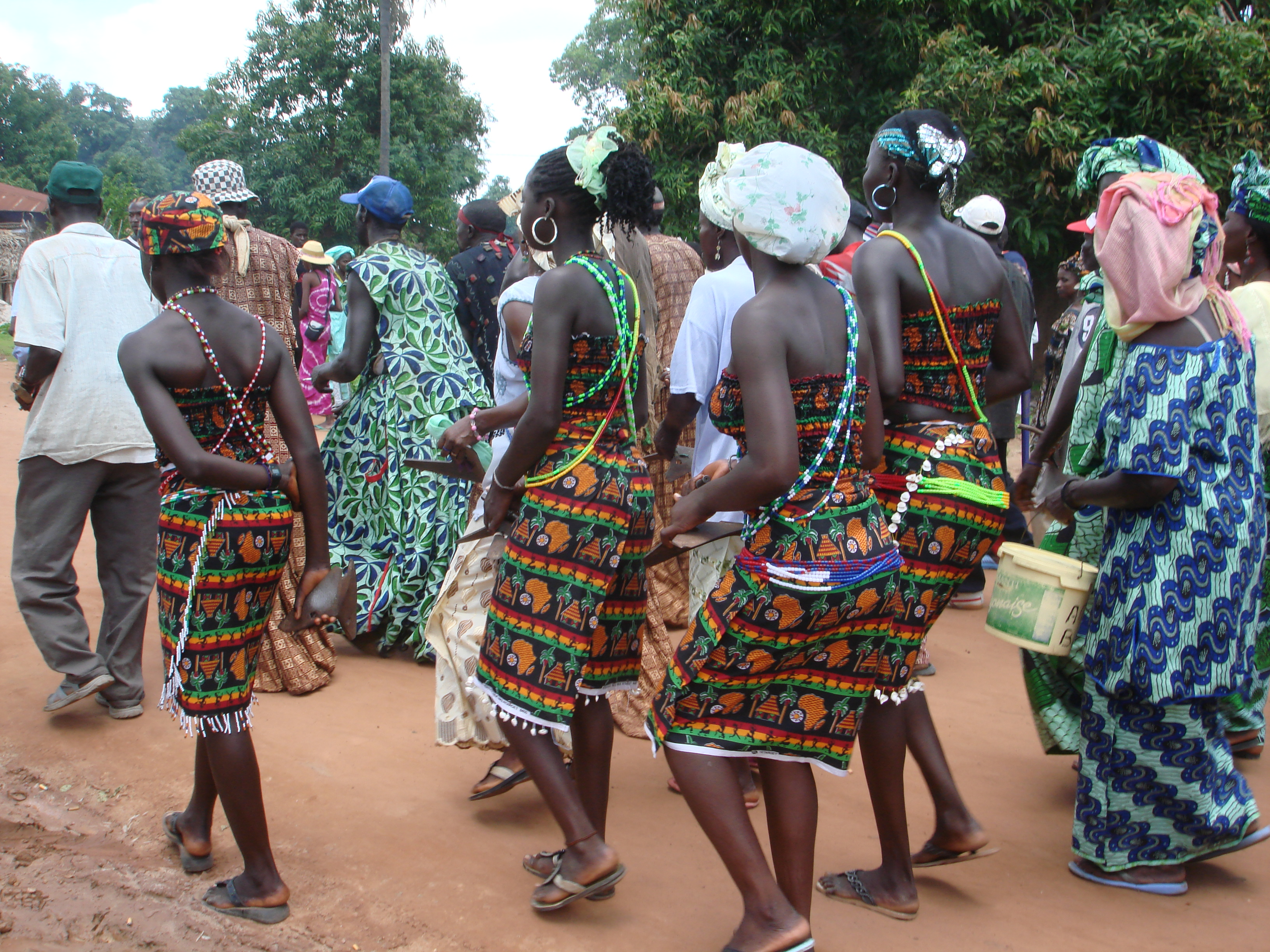
- Jola girls dancing

Total population
- 900,000

Regions with significant populations
- Senegal, the Gambia, Guinea-Bissau
- Senegal: 687,852 (4%)
- Gambia: 182,807 (10.5%)
- Guinea-Bissau: 6,000 (0.4%)

Languages
- Jola, French, Kriol, English, Portuguese

Religion
- Majority: 91% Islam; Significant minority: 1% African traditional religion (Jola religion), 8% Christianity

Related ethnic groups
- Balanta people and Papel people

The Jola or Diola (endonym: Ajamat) are an ethnic group found in Senegal, the Gambia, and Guinea-Bissau. Most Jola live in small villages scattered throughout southern Senegal, especially in the Lower Casamance region. The main dialect of the Jola language, Fogni, is one of the six national languages of Senegal.

Their economy has been based on wet rice cultivation for at least one thousand years. This system has been characterised "one of the most significant examples of 'agrarian civilizations' in West Africa". However, the Jola probably reached the Lower Casamance region in the 14th century, assimilating the previous Bainuk people and their rice tradition. In colonial times, the Jola began to cultivate peanuts as a cash crop in the drier forests. Other activities include palm wine tapping, honey collecting, livestock rearing and the production of other crops such as sweet potatoes, yams and watermelon.

The traditional religion of the Jola is animism, which is practised through fetishistic rituals and ceremonies. However, the Jola populations living in well-connected areas have become Islamized due to the influence of the nearby Mandinka people. As a result, many Jola no longer speak their own language and more than half are now Muslims. Unlike the dominant cultures of West Africa, most Jola communities lack any social or political stratification, being organised into families or neighbourhoods. However, some communities have a central authority, a king, whose role resembles more that of a priest than of a traditional secular leader. The most prominent Jola kingdom is in Oussouye. Among the Muslim Jola, there is also the marabout, a religious leader and teacher. Traditional animist rituals are overseen by elders, who have an important role in Jola society. For Jola boys to attain manhood, they must take part in the initiation ceremony known as bukut, which takes place every 20 to 25 years in every Jola village.

== Name ==
The word Jola is the Mandinka name for this ethnic group and means 'people who pay back', since Jolas are renowned for doing back what has been done to them, be it a good or a bad deed. This name was first popularized in the nineteenth century. The name of the Jola tribe in their own language is Ajamat (singular) or Ajamataw (plural). Diola is the traditional transliteration in French, which is also very common in English sources.

== Language and subgroups ==
The Jola speak the Jola language, which is divided into a variety of dialects which may not, at times, be mutually intelligible. These dialects correspond to the different Jola tribes:

- Banjaal spoken in a small area south of the Casamance River.
- Bayot spoken around Ziguinchor.
- KuDiola spoken in a handful of villages south of Oussouye.
- Fogni (Kujamaat) spoken around Bignona.
- Gusilay spoken in the village of Thionck Essyl.
- Karon spoken along the coast of Casamance south of Diouloulou.
- Kasa spoken around Oussouye.
- Kuwaataay spoken along the coast south of the Casamance River.
- Mlomp spoken in the village of Mlomp.

== Religion ==
Overall, the majority of Jolas (91%) are Muslims. In Gambia, 90% of Jolas are Muslims. Some Jolas continue to follow their traditional religion and rituals in spite of the influence of Islam and Christianity in recent times. Even though some accepted Islam after the Soninke-Marabout war, they honour the traditional use of palm wine in their rituals. They have one God that they associate with the natural phenomena like sky, rain, and the year, Emit or Ata Emit, literally, "To Whom Belongs The Universe" or "The Master-Owner Of The Universe". They have charms and sacred precincts that they honour and with which they communicate (but do not worship). The Jola people believe that spirits called Bakin or Eneerti (Mandinka Jalang) can protect their families, their villages, and their rice fields; and can even protect them from conversion to Islam and Christianity.

Before the influence of Islam and Christianity in their ways of beliefs, all Jolas placed great respect in the proper observation of funeral ceremony, and still today some do, for they are of the belief that it enables the dead person's soul to go to its final destination to join his or her ancestors. It was and still is strongly accepted by those Jolas who still practice their ancestral religion that without performing these funeral sacred rites, the soul is prevented from entering the presence of the creator (Ata Amit), and the ancestors. Jolas believed strongly in living a good humanistic life in this world. They believe that if one lives a bad life in this world, when the person dies the soul of the dead person is punished to become an exile spirit with no bed to lie on. In the Jola Cassa subgroup this exile spirit is called a Holowa. This exiled spirit becomes a roaming spirit with no respect from the other spirits.

Some Jola religious festivals include the Samay, Kumpo and Niasse.

== Culture ==
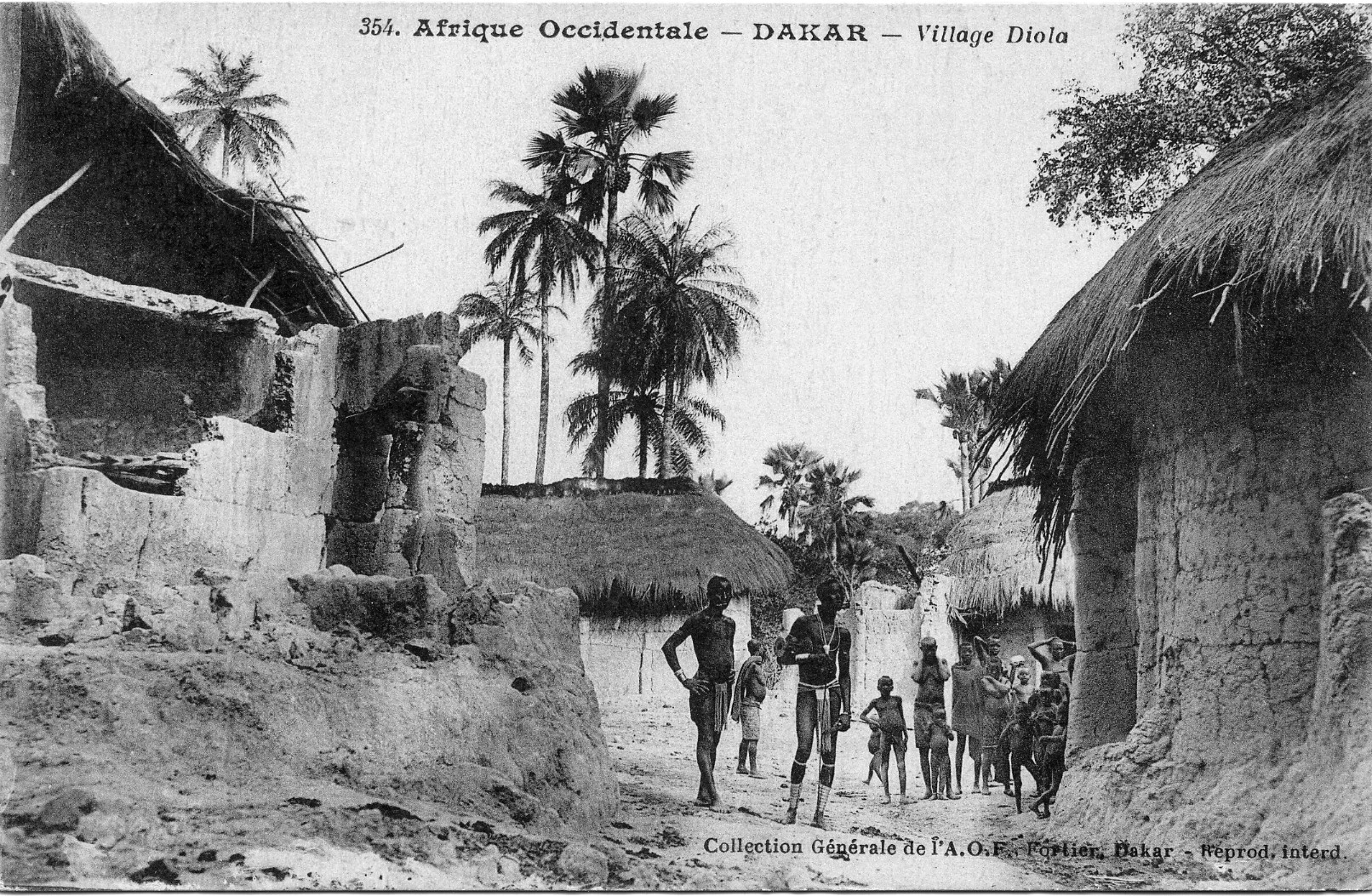
Jola village

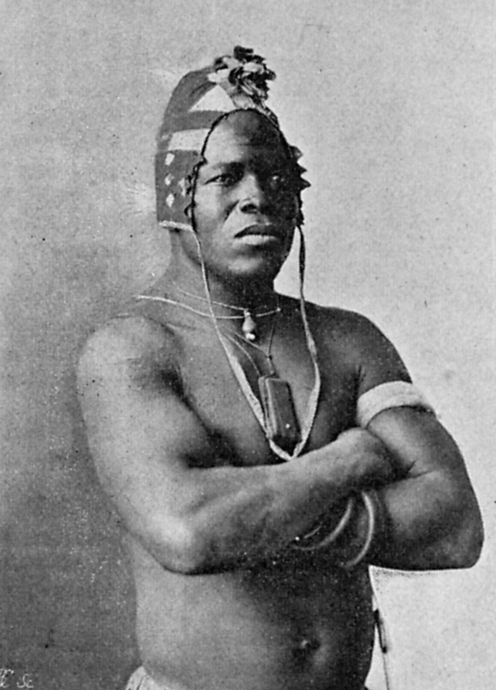
Diola (circa 1902)

Unlike most ethnic groups of the Senegambian region, the Jola do not have a caste system of Jewelers griots, slaves, nobility, leather workers, etc. Their communities are based on extended clan settlements that are normally large enough to be given independent names, including the Jola Karon, Jola Mlomp, Jola Elinnkin, Jola Caginol, Jola Huluf, Jola Jamat, Jola Joheyt, Jola Bayot, Jola Brin, Jola Seleky, Jola Kabrouse, Jola Jiwat, and Jola Foni. Jolas are also able herbal medicine practitioners. Their high adaptation to nature and the environment allowed them to be able to create a civilisation centred on music, natural medicine, and most important of all, rice cultivation, which they do effectively by using a locally made farming tool called the kajando.

Like some of the other indigenous ethnic groups of the Senegambian region—the Baga, the Balanta, the Konyagi, etc.—the Jola ethnic group did not develop a political scale that expanded beyond village level compared to ethnic groups that migrated to the region like the Soninke and the Mandinka. But this does not mean they did not develop a sophisticated political system. The egalitarian nature of their societies (rare in most societies), structured around the limited village environment gave them the possibilities to develop a political system based on collective consciousness, which they worked through their initiation rites. In a sense, the Jolas' political achievement in the village was socialism. It was totally tied to their religious belief in the Bakin. This political achievement is not easy to reach if the society that runs it does not have well-defined rules of administration and penalties. Jolas have many traditional economic activities like fishing, farming groundnuts, tapping palm wine, and processing palm oil: their most intensive economic activity is rice cultivation, which is tied closely to their religion and social organization. Jolas are also palm oil manufacturers and palm wine tappers in the Senegambian region. They farm cows, pigs, goats, chickens, sheep and ducks. Jola crafts include basket weaving, pottery, and building.

Elders are considered very important in Jola society and are believed to possess occult powers and guard societal traditions. In villages, a council of elders make many of the daily decisions for the community and exert much influence. Despite the patriarchal nature of Jola society, many women played major roles in the community and were often members in village councils, religious leaders, and landowners. Women are also important as cultivators of wet rice fields in which they predominated. Polygamy and genital mutilation are not practiced by the Jola although outside influence has made these more common in certain villages.

When a married man dies, it is common for his house to be torn down, and for his widow to move into a different home. Homes for widows are known as kungomaku, and the women living in them typically make a living by working on borrowed rice paddies or by begging. In recent years, the use of kungomaku have increased as women have decided not to remarry.

=== Ritualistic Practices ===
Male Initiation Ceremony

The male initiation tradition or Bukut, happens every twenty to twenty-five years. Every male in the village aged 12 to 35 goes out into the sacred woods for upwards of three weeks to be initiated. This includes circumcision as well as sacrificing animals and libations. Now, the ceremony is more symbolic as society changes, but traditionally the ceremony was used to show the village that boys were now ready for marriage. Bukut is regarded as one of the most important ceremonies of the Jola people. Preparations are made months in advance. After the official announcement of the ceremony, the boys who partake will learn a song organized by their mothers that they will sing at Buyeet, a ritual where the mother of the boy presents him with cloth or pagnes. Each song is individual to the person. Bukut begins with three days of celebration called Garuur. Men who have previously went through initiation will dance at this celebration to show courage and strength. After entering the sacred forest, all contact with the village is halted. After their stay in the woods, the boys will be reintegrated into society as men.

Wrestling

Wrestling practices are very common among many Jola societies. They are for boys and girls coming of age in society, shaping their identity, preparing them for possible war, and enhancing their fertility before marriage. This practice could be considered training for becoming a warrior, as hand to hand combat is important in Jola culture. Wrestling is regarded as spiritual combat, which means most matches are dedicated to certain deities. Wrestlers must have a strong sense of spirituality to ward off malevolent spirits trying to mess up their match. There are a variety of ritualistic practices that take place before a wrestling match. The rituals are also important for the socialization of young people into ritual society, the shrines also calling on the rain and fertility of the crops, women, and the community as a whole. They link to one of the creation stories, where the first man and woman wrestle each other. Day of the performance, wrestlers wear short cloths and arm and ankle cuffs made out of fan palm fibers. Wrestlers also often wore amulets, called gris-gris, or medicine to protect themselves.

Though, different religious associations often had different protections to wear during the wrestle. Jola muslims would wear special verses of the Qur'an given to them by an Islamic teacher or marabout. These verses are tied up in a leather pouch, a goat's horn, or other special container and worn on the arms or legs hidden under their attire. The Qur'an verses could also be written in a non-permanent ink and then bathed in or drank by a wrestler who was seeking extra fighting assistance. Catholic Jola individuals might wear certain medals or crucifixes from saints to offer them protection. Jola people who follow the traditional religion, might wear shells with soil from an altar from the region of a spirit shrine or special roots can be worn around the arms or legs. All protective elements that can be adorned before a fight. Many ritualistic practices happen the night before a fight, specifically males go through a ritual asking for strength, hoping to gain success. For girls in Ediamat society in southern Jola, being at the ritual before a ceremony is supposed to increase fertility before getting married the next rainy season. Some wrestling practices also take place for the fertility of the Oyei or priest-king of the village as well.

Warriors

War was very common for the Jola in the eighteenth and nineteenth centuries, often fighting with the Bainouk society, the Mandinka, Luso-African radiers, or even with Jola sub-groups trying to claim territory. The common weaponry used bow and arrow, machete, and spears. Muskets were used sparingly as they were slow at reloading and weren't always accurate. Close handed combat was most common. A subsection of Jola civilization call the Esulalu, take spiritual protection very seriously. Often the night before going into battle, warriors gathered at a spirit shrine associated with the warrior party. At these shrines, they would gather to talk about strategy plans, decide if they go into battle, and request the protection of the shrine. People could not gather at the shrine if they were not a part of the land protected by the shrine, which could be at a minimum the size of a neighborhood. This can indicate alliances and community relations in the area that the shrine was created. The strength of the shrine comes from people in the nearby area that can see the water spirits called, Ammahl. The individuals who could see the spirits would commune with them about community concerns, including war. When the Ammahl see the war as justified they aid the warriors in battle. Other protection rituals include Katapf, the shrine where individuals request protection from metal objects. These objects include knives, axes, and other weapons. These rituals can be done at anytime, not just in war, even though that is most common. When muskets were introduced into battle there was a new ritual created called, Houpoombene, which aided in hunting and protected against bullets or explosion. Both of these were utilized by warriors.

=== Visual Arts ===
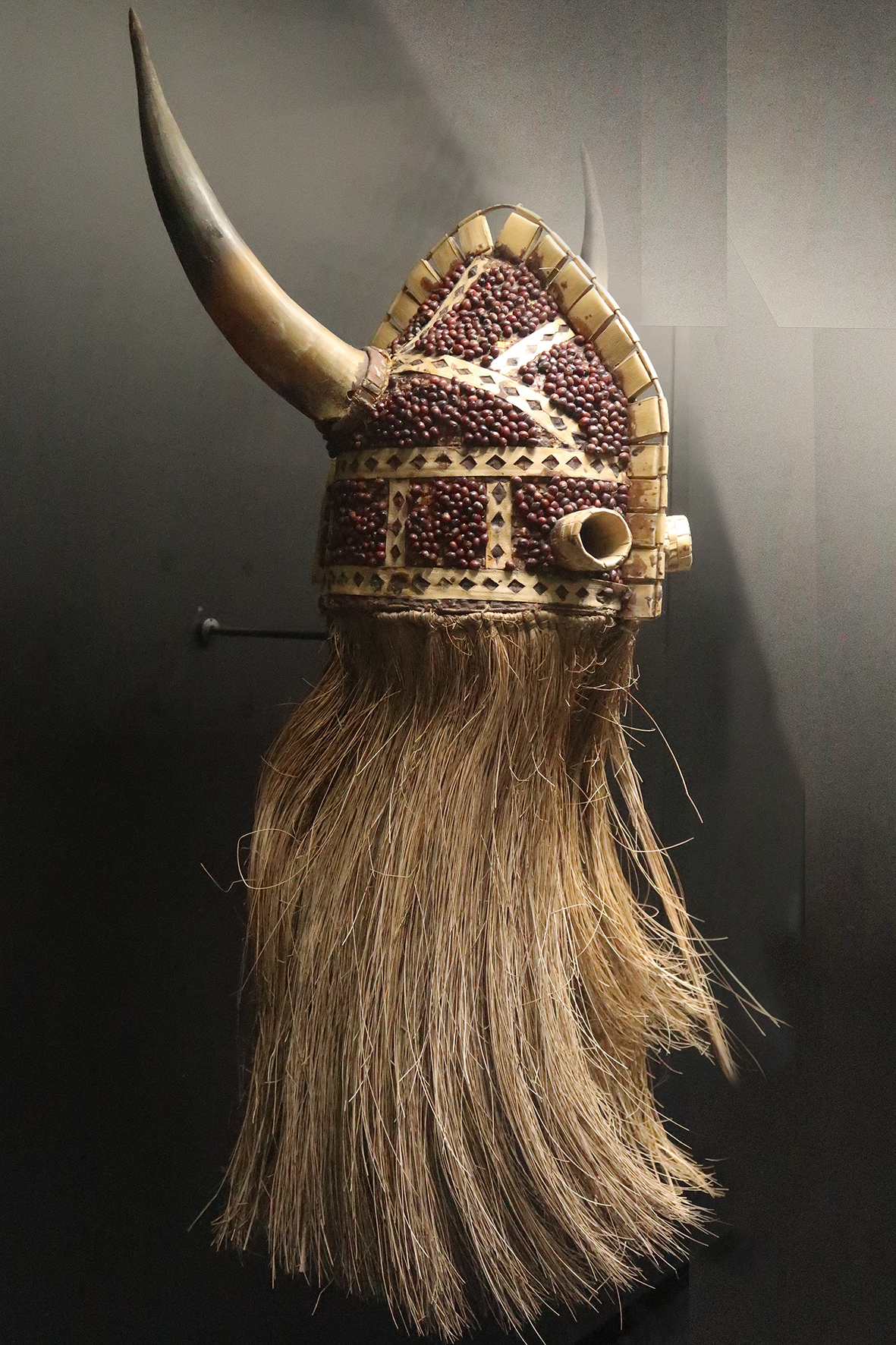
Ejumba Mask, Museum of Natural History in Toulouse.

The Horned Initiation Mask, Ejumba, is used in the male initiation ceremony taking place in Jola culture. The mask itself is made of woven fibers and topped with animal horns. The mask is cylindrical, covering the entire head with two smaller cylindrical eye holes. There are no eyes or nose in the mask. Traditionally the mask was topped with antelope horns but in recent generations, cattle have become much more popular of a choice. The mask is made by slicing long palm leave into strips to be woven together. These are worn by the boys being initiated into society during the ceremony. They are usually worn by the older initiates during the reintroduction back into society at the end of the ceremony. They are used during ritualistic dances during this time as well. The mask can also be found worn in other cultures in south Senegal, Guinea-Bissau, and Gambia, like the Manding and the Balante. It is still most notably referred back to the Jola.

=== Music ===
Musical practices of the Jola people are diverse and have expanded with the social and political changes of Africa, specifically in the Kuujamaat region. Men and women traditionally have different roles in song and participate in different aspects of the events. Men's songs take place during rice cultivation, funerary practices, and wrestling events. Women's songs take place specifically during funerary dances or songs lamenting the dead. In the instance where both men and women have roles during a song, they are separated by distinct parts. Both men and women only participate in the same song if it is secular or takes place during the circumcision parade.

Bugáár

A Bugáár is a secular dance performed by both men and women. The main member of this dance is the drummer, who is always male. The drummer plays three to four large animal skinned drums that go from highest to lowest pitch. They also wear iron wrist rattles while they play. The drummer is joined by a male chorus group as well as male soloists. The soloists take turns singing in each chorus of the song. The drummer and male singers are all lined up together facing the women's group. The women stand parallel to the men and play clappers. Clappers are pieces of wood that are stuck together and beat to make a rhythmic pattern. The drummers are the most important member of this dance and are in high demand, especially during the summer months. The best drummers often travel from village to village during the dry months to play. Otherwise, each performance is performed by locals to the village.

Siling

Siling is a group of communal songs sung in the fields while harvesting rice. Siling is only performed by men. Each song is sung by two choruses, that alternate back and forth. Each community has its own version of the siling songs that remain fairly consistent throughout history. Sometimes, a new song is added, but that is a rare occasion. Siling can also be performed at funerary practices. This could be considered one of the oldest, and most traditional forms of singing.

Esimben

The Esimben (also referred to as the Furaaka) is a four stringed instrument resembling the Kora from Manding culture. This instrument is performed alongside another typically. The first performer will play a calabash sound box with two sticks, which can be used like a drum, while the other will play the Esimben. The two performers will alternate singing verses back and forth. Traditionally this song is performed for groups in local villages, or even for individuals. This performance can also be used to insult specific people or groups if requested and paid for like that. Recently, this performance is seen performed by praise-singers, moving village to village hoping to accumulate money by singing for anyone paying for the compliments.

==== Ekonting ====
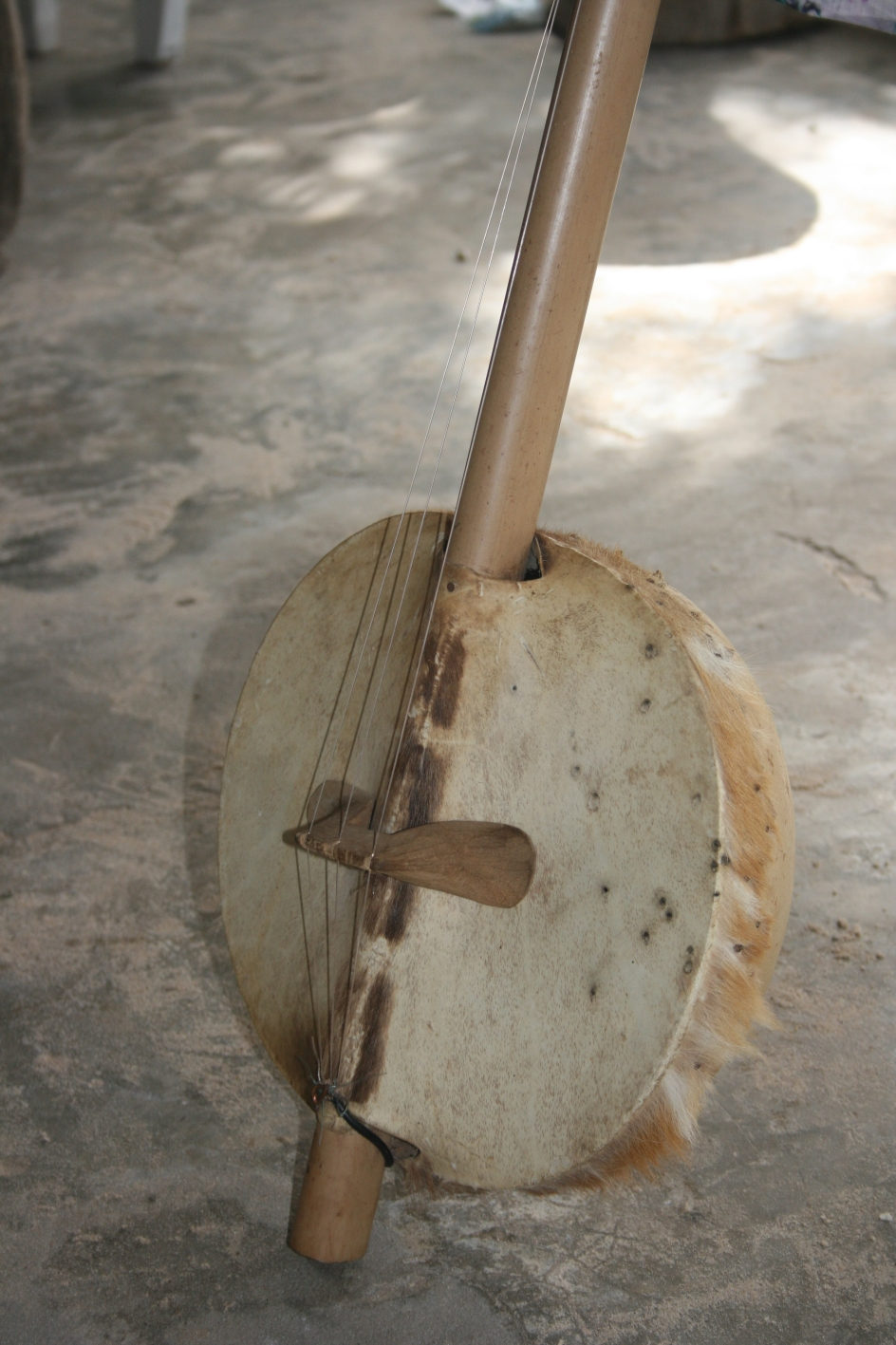
An ekonting

The ekonting is a three-string gourd instrument, the folk lute of the Jola people. It has an internal pass through body dowel stick with a round gourd body and its sound box is made of a hemispherical calabash, with a nailed goatskin. Before the invention of nails, palm tree thorns or wood pegs were used as nails. The three strings, which are attached to a long neck, today are nylon fishing line. Before, they were made of palm tree roots (Jola language: kuhall kata kubekel). The neck is a bamboo stick (Mandinka language: bangoe) that passes through the calabash to the other side. A hole is made in the sound box to allow the sound to escape. The bridge of the ekonting is not fixed to its skin as many lutes are. It is free, and can be moved back and forth on the skin of the sound box and it is always held in position by the pressure of the strings when it is in playing position.

==== Galire ====
The galire is a one-string instrument of the Jola of Thionck-Essyl, with its strings stretched across a single 1-meter curve made of fine mangrove wood. At first sight, it looks like a hunter's bow. It is played with one hand holding a flexible fine string (made of palm leaves) beating on the arc's string, while the other hand holds one end of the arc and adjusts the tune with the thumb. The other end of the arc rests in the mouth of the player, who sings. The vibration from the player's song on the string of the arc and the beating with the fine flexible string leads to the pleasant and characteristic sound of the galire.

The exile of young people to cities has led to the stark decline in usage of this traditional instrument among the Jola people of Casamance and the Gambia.

==== Other musical instruments ====
Below is a list of few Jola instruments. Note: The Jola language of Thionck Essyl is used to name them. Their names may differ somewhat in other villages' languages.

- Bakiti: like two maracas without the handle attached with one cord
- Bougarabou
- Ediando: used by the women during initiation dances
- Efemme: a calebasse reversed in a container full of water. Used by women to improvise for or replace a drum when it's raining.
- Elere
- Emombi: used only during initiation - sacred and rarely seen - once each 20 to 30 years
- Etantang: used for Koumpo dance and wrestling festivities
- Ewang: used during male initiation
- Fouindoum: drum used during initiation
- Gabilene: sound make with a horn of an animal

== History ==
The Jola are widely considered the first inhabitants of the lower reaches of the Casamance and Gambia rivers.

The megaliths and stone circles of the area may have been built by the ancestors of the Serer people or of the Jola.

Around the 11th century, in response to a progressively drying climate, Jola farmers created a padi system for growing rice, impounding rain and stream water during the wet season in padis.

The Serer and Jola people believe in a post colonial myth of common ancestry and have a joking relationship with each other which they assign to their ancient shared cultural heritage. According to the legend of Jambooñ and Againe (an ancient Serer and Jola legend), two sisters boarded a pirogue with their parties. Due to act of nature, the pirogue broke into half at the Point of Sangomar. Those who headed south became the ancestors of the Jola (descendants of Agaire) and those who headed north became the ancestors of the Serer people (descendants of Jambooñ). The Point of Sangomar is one of the sacred Serer sites. However, modern historians and scholars contend that this shared origin narrative may be a post-colonial construction utilized to foster national unity between northern and southern Senegal. Historically, the Serer originated in northern Senegal and migrated from the Fouta Toro region to their current location around the 11th century, whereas the Jola originate from the southern region of Senegambia. Furthermore, the two groups maintain distinct cultures and speak languages that are not closely related, while "Jola" itself is an exonym derived from Mandinka meaning "one who pays back" rather than the group's native endonym, which is Ajamat (plural Ajamataw).

== Notable Jola people ==
- Pierre Goudiaby Atepa, architectural engineer in Senegal.
- Alexander Mendy
- Alioune Badara Faty
- Agostinho Cá
- Baciro Candé
- Bakery Jatta
- Batista Mendy
- Benjamin André
- Charlie Davies
- Dayot Upamecano
- Dion Lopy
- Domingas Togna
- Ebou Adams
- Edelino Ié
- Emiliano Té
- Elhadji Malick Tall
- Ismail Jakobs
- Jules Francois Bocandé, footballer
- Bruma, footballer
- Mamadu Candé
- Mesca
- James Gomez
- John Carew, footballer
- Joseph Lopy
- Maixent Coly, Bishop of Ziguinchor (1995–2010)
- Ansu Fati
- Jacques Faty
- Ricardo Faty
- Romain Gall
- Arthur Gómez
- Emmanuel Gómez
- Edgar Ié
- Yahya Jammeh, President of the Gambia (July 1994 to 2017)
- Maudo Jarjué
- Pa Modou Jagne
- Mansa Suling Jatta, King of Kombo (Gambia)
- Joshua King
- Papis Loveday
- Nuha Marong
- Arial Mendy
- Q-Tip (musician), rapper from the band A Tribe Called Quest
- Augustin Sagna, Bishop of Ziguinchor (1966–1995)
- Bacary Sagna, footballer
- Robert Sagna, politician
- Jill Scott, musician
- Lang Tombong Tamba, former army chief of staff of the Gambia
- Sheck Wes
- Opa Sanganté
- Omar Gaye
- Piqueti
- Steve Ambri
- Virgil Gomis
- Wilson Manafá
- Zidane Banjaqui
- Oumar Niasse

== See also ==
- La Mulâtresse Solitude
- Musée de la Culture Diola
