= Karoninka people =

Ethnic group in West Africa

Manjack
Total population
- 117000

Regions with significant populations

Languages
- Karon and French

Related ethnic groups
- Jola

The Karoninka people (also called Karone) are an ethnic group in West Africa related to the Jola. They live mainly in Casamance, Senegal, on the right bank of the Casamance River and the islands in the mouth, but also in The Gambia.

== Population ==
They represent approximately 1% of the population of Senegal.

== See also ==
- Carabane
- Demographics of Senegal
