= Mlomp language =

Bak language of Senegal

Mlomp
- Native to: Senegal
- Region: Southwest Senegal
- Native speakers: 5,400 (2006)
- Language family: Niger–Congo?: Atlantic–Congo; Bak; Jola; Jola Proper; Karon–Mlomp; Mlomp

Language codes
- ISO 639-3: mlo
- Glottolog: mlom1238
- ELP: Mlomp

The Mlomp language, also known as Gulompaay, is spoken in Senegal. It belongs to the Bak branch of the Niger–Congo language family, and is closely related to the Karon language.

Mlomp is mainly spoken in the village of Mlomp to the north of the Casamance River, 25 km west of Bignona, between Tendouck and Thiobon (not to be confused with the Mlomp located a dozen kilometres from Oussouye, where the Kasa language is spoken).
