= Manjak =

Manjak may refer to:

- Manjak language, a Bak language spoken by the Manjak people
- Manjak people, an ethnic group in Guinea-Bissau and Senegal
- Manjak (Vladičin Han), a village in Serbia
- Dejan Manjak (fl. 1333), Serbian nobleman

== See also ==
- Manjack (disambiguation)
