= Joola =

Joola may refer to:

- MV Le Joola, a ferry that capsized in Senegal in 2002
- Jola people, an ethnic group of West Africa
  - Jola languages
