= Manjack =

Manjack may refer to:

- Manjack language, the language of the Manjacks
- Manjack people, an ethnic group in Guinea-Bissau and Senegal
- Pink manjack (Tabebuia heterophylla), a tree of the Caribbean islands
- A number of Cordia species of shrubs and trees
- Manjack, a town in Montserrat
- Manjack Cay, one of the Abaco Islands in the Bahamas
- Manjack, manjak, or glance pitch, a brittle form of graphite-matrix bitumen found in the Scotland District of Barbados and in Vistabella, Trinidad
- Joseph Manjack (born 2002), American football player

== See also ==
- Man Jack, an every-man in the phrase "every man Jack"
- Manjak (disambiguation)
