= Kasa kingdom =

Former kingdom dominant in Lower Casamance, present-day Senegal

Kingdom of Kasa
- Status: Kingdom
- Capital: Brikama
- Common languages: Mandinka, Bainuk
- Religion: African traditional religions, Islam
- Government: Monarchy
- Mansa
  - 1570-90: Mansa Tamba

The kingdom of Kasa, also known as Kasanga, was the dominant kingdom in lower Casamance (now Senegal) during the 15th and 16th centuries. Many of the inhabitants of the realm were Bainuk or other native ethnicities, but it was ruled by a Mandinkized elite. The capital was Brikama, located on the south bank of the Casamance River.

== History ==
The Bainuk people were likely formed by a combination of the first inhabitants of the Casamance region with newcomers from the Tenda areas to the east. They established numerous kingdoms between the Cacheu River and the Gambia, which eventually federated into Kasa.

In the 15th century, Portuguese slave traders and navigators established a trading station in the area. They also formed trade relations with the Mansa of Kasa, giving the river the name 'Casamance'. During this period, the Kasa capital of Brikama held a monopoly of all European trade on the river, and the kingdom became wealthy through gold and slave trading.

Kasanga, along with the Bainuk, were major importers of cotton from Cape Verde for their domestic cloth industry. In 1570 the lancados of Buguendo sought support against their Bainuk hosts from Mansa Tamba of Kasa, starting a war that lasted until the mansa's death in 1590.

Kasa's power was gradually declining in this period. Their powerful cavalry force was decimated by increasing rates of sleeping sickness due to increasing rainfall and tse-tse fly proliferation, and Jola and Bainuk blockades of the rivers prevented resupply from Portuguese merchants. Much of Kasa's territory was seized by the Bainuk and the Mandinka kingdoms of Birassu and Kiang, including the major port of Tendaba. The kingdom persisted as a rump state around Brikama, however. Only in 1830 did the Balantas capture and destroy Brikama.

== Sources ==
- Barry, Boubakar. Senegambia and the Atlantic Slave Trade, (Cambridge: University Press, 1998) p. 42
- Clark and Phillips. Historical Dictionary of Senegal. p. 179-180
- Mane, Idrissa (2021). "Les Banun: espaces, origines, et formation". In Fall, Mamadou; Fall, Rokhaya; Mane, Mamadou (eds.). Bipolarisation du Senegal du XVIe - XVIIe siecle (in French). Dakar: HGS Editions. pp. 317–376.
