= Bandial language =

Jola language of the Casamance region of Senegal

Bandial
- Eegima
- Banjaal
- Native to: Senegal
- Region: south of the Casamance River
- Native speakers: 16,000 (2017)
- Language family: Niger–Congo?: Atlantic–Congo; Bak; Jola; Bandial
- Dialects: Bandial; Affiniam; Elun

Language codes
- ISO 639-3: bqj
- Glottolog: band1340
- ELP: Bandial

Bandial (Banjaal), or Eegima (Eegimaa), is a Jola language of the Casamance region of Senegal. The three dialects, Affiniam, Bandial proper, and Elun (Hulon, also Kuluunaay, Kujireray) are divergent, on the border between dialects and distinct languages.

== Classification ==
Bandial has the highest percentage of similarity with Fulup at 87% and is classified as one of the Jóola dialects in Sapir's West Atlantic inventory. Bandial is classified amongst Central Jóola languages as a member of the Endungo language group. The Jóola varieties are mutually intelligible. Even though some who do not speak some Jóola varieties are not part of the former Kingdom of Mof-Ávvi where Bandial is spoken, they are considered as having a direct historical link to Mof-Ávvi though not so much with other Jóola groups due to the dictation of oral tradition.

== History ==
Oral tradition says that the ancestors of the Mof-Ávvi migrated from Guinea-Bissau in search for arable land. Besides contact with other Jóola people and the Bainounk people from the village of Jibonker inhabitants of Mof-Ávvi were isolated from the outside world until French imperialism.

== Geographic distribution ==
Along with the Mankagn, Manjak, Bainouk, Manding, Balanta and Fula (French: Peul; Fula: Fulɓe), Jóola people are one of the many peoples that inhabit the region of Senegal known as Casamance. Jóola people and languages are distributed over three West-African countries: Guinea-Bissau, Senegal and The Gambia. Many Jóola of Senegal live in the former Casamance region, mainly in the Basse-Casamance (Lower Casamance), the present-day region of Ziguinchor.

Many Bandial speakers live in a former small Kingdom of ten villages known as Mof-Ávvi ‘the king's land’, located eighteen kilometers southwest of the city of Ziguinchor. Mof-Ávvi is a peninsula composed of the following ten villages: Bajjat, Essil, Bátiŋer-yal-Essil, Gáabal, Enappor, Sállagi, Bátiŋer-Bulan, Elubalir, Ettama and Banjal. These villages are usually divided by the inhabitants of Mof-Ávvi between Fásuga which includes villages located in the mainland (Bajjat, Essil, Gáabal, Enappor) and Gállux ‘mud’ which comprises islands (Bátiŋer-yal-Essil, Sállagi, Bátiŋer-Bulan, Elubalir, Ettama, Banjal.) Many speakers of Bandial, up to 2/5 of the population of Mof-Ávvi live outside of the area, for example in Ziguinchor or Dakar.

== Speakers ==
The majority of speakers are multilingual, with languages dependent on their life history. The most common other languages in speakers' repertoires are French, Wolof and other Joola languages. French is the official language of Senegal, retained after independence from France and is the official language of instruction in schools. Wolof is the most widely spoken language in Senegal. Bandial is the predominant language spoken in Mof-Ávvi and children are still learning it.

== Dialects ==
Gújjolaay Eegimaa (Bandial) is also known by several names most of which refer to village names. The language is referred to by the Jóola from the northern bank of the Casamance River as Bandial. Bandial, one of the villages of Mof-Ávvi, is an island that is located halfway between the Búluf and the Kaasa areas. It is suggested, even by those from Bandial, that the language of the people from Mof-Ávvi is called Gújjolaay/ Gújjoloay Eegimaa.

The problem in using the term 'Bandial' or ‘Banjal’ for Gújjolaay Eegimaa is that the variety spoken in the village of Banjal stands out with more phonological and lexical differences compared to other villages where the language is spoken. Because of these differences, native speakers of Eegimaa from other villages of Mof-Ávvi restrict the term Banjal (Gubanjalay) to the dialect that is peculiar to the village of Bandial.

== Phonology ==
Like all languages, Bandial can be phonologically described by the vowels and consonants present in its language and by the way Bandial combines phonemes to produce syllables. The following are characterizations of Bandial vowels, consonants, and syllables.

Bandial has ten vowels.

=== Bandial vowels ===
	Front	Central	Back
High	i		u
	ɪ		ʊ
Mid-high	e		o
Mid-low	ԑ		ɔ
		ɐ	
Low		a	

Bandial has seventeen singleton consonants.

=== Bandial singleton consonants ===
	Bilabial	Labia-Dental	Alveolar	Palatal	Velar	Glottal
Stop	p b		t d	c ɟ	k g	ʔ
Nasal	m		n	ɲ	ŋ	
Fricative		f				
Approximant	w			j		
Trill						
Lateral			l			

Bandial allows five types of syllables and the following syllable combinations

=== Bandial syllables ===
Syllables	Meaning
V	Vowel
CV	Consonant+Vowel
VC	Vowel+Consonant
CVC	Consonant+Vowel+Consonant
CVCC	Consonant+Vowel+Consonant+Consonant

=== Bandial syllable combinations ===
		2nd Syllable	2nd Syllable	2nd Syllable	2nd Syllable
		CVC	VC	CV	V
1st Syllable	CVC	-	-	-	-
1st Syllable	VC	-	-	-	-
1st Syllable	CV	+	+	+	+
1st Syllable	V	+	+	+	+

== Writing system ==
Bandial is often written in the Latin alphabet as linguists attempt to create an appropriate alphabet to capture the phonological regularities of the language. Often this is some combination of the alphabet of the recording linguists native tongue and IPA. Common romanizations of Bandial are based on French orthography since it is a major language of Senegal.

Bandial Alphabet
a	á	b	bb	ĉ	c	d	e	é	f	g	h	i	í	j	k	l	m	mb
n	ñ	ŋ	nd	nj	ng	o	ó	ᵽ	p	r	s	t	u	ú	v	w	y	

== Grammar ==
Bandial is classified as an agglutinative language. Various morphemes combine to form words.

=== Bandial word formation with morphemes ===
Bandial sentence	Gloss	English translation
ԑ-ȶԑβ	CM-carry	to carry
ʊ-ȶԑj-ԑn-a	CM-run-CAUS-AGENT	drivers
a-ȶԑβ-ԑn-ԑn-a-ɪl	CM-carry-CAUS-PAST-AGENT-POSS	their former promoter

Bandial is a pro-drop language. Subject pronouns are omitted since an affix can be attached to the verb to indicate the pronoun subject. Pronouns are only included in sentences for emphasis. Also articles and other nominal modifiers come after the noun, which is common in other Senegalese languages.

=== Morphology ===
One of the most important morphological features of Bandial is its elaborate classifications of nouns. Often prefixes are attached to root morphemes in Bandial to indicate the lexical and semantic classification of the word. These prefixes will be referred to as class markers. The exact number of Bandial noun classes is often a topic of debate among linguists.

==== Possible noun classes ====
Class marker in IPA	Functions
ø- ~ a-	Human (singular)
bʊɡ-	Human (plural)
ɲɪ- ~ ɲʊ-	Abstract nouns
ba-	Abstract nouns, collective nouns
fa-	Collective noun, mass nouns
ma-	Abstract nouns
ɟa-	Irregular infinitive, mass nouns
w-	Mass nouns, plural
tɪ-	Place nouns
nɪ-	Temporal adverb marker

=== Syntax ===
Bandial has a Subject-Verb-Object (SVO) word ordering.

When a noun phrase is the subject of the sentence, it is positioned before the verb and has agreement with verbs such as in intransitive clauses. In monotransitive clauses, the object follows the verb without showing any agreement. When there a double object construction such as with ditransitive clauses, the ordering of the two objects are not fixed. Rather they are ordered according to animacy.

==== Bandial word ordering examples ====
(ɪnɟԑ) nɪ-ssaf-ɪ
(S) SM-V-OBJ
I greet you.

bɪ-llɛmʊɲa baβu bu-ffɐnum-e
{CM-lemon tree} CM.DEF.ART CM-old-PERF
The lemon tree is old.

a-ccɛ na-vvɔɣ-ɔm
CM-INDEF SM-call-1.SG.OBJ
Someone called me.

== Lexicon ==
Various morphemes attach to a verb in a clause of sentence in Bandial. Some morphemes which do so are subject markers, object markers, verb tense, verb aspect, and modality.

In Bandial adjectives behave like verbs. They take most of the morphemes used with verbs. According to Welmers, many languages within the Niger-Congo family have a very small set of 'pure' adjectives. These words tend to either behave like verbs or cannot really be distinguished from nouns.

Bandial demonstratives make a three-way distinction. There are proximal, medial, and distal demonstratives which indicate close to the speaker, relatively away from the speaker, and further away from the speaker respectively.

Numerals are formed on a system base five. The basic numbers of Bandial are one through five and ten, fifteen and twenty with which other numbers are expressed. The number system is dactylonomic. The literal translation of the Bandial word for ten is 'hands' for fifteen it is 'foot' (you add your five toes to ten fingers) and it is 'king' for twenty.

=== Bandial Numeral System ===
Cardinals	English	Ordinals	English
-anʊr	'one'	-tinar	'first'
-uβa	'two'	-utten	'second'
-ffɐʝi	'three'	-ffɐtten	'third'
-bbaɣɪr	'four'	-barɪɣɛn	'fourth'
fʊ-ȶɔx	'five'	-tɔɣɛn	'fifth'
ɡu-ɲɛn	'ten'		
ɡa-aȶ	'fifteen'		
ɐ-vvi	'twenty'		
e-ȶemel	'one hundred'		
e-uli	'one thousand'		
ɛmɪlɪɔŋ	'one million'		

== Examples ==
The following are excerpts from an interview by Sagna and Abass Sory Bassène about the traditional religion of the Gújjolaay Eegimaa people:

ter a-vvasen-a, ter aw n-ú-ttubi-ttubi, ter aw a-jangara
whether NC1-libation-AGT whether 2SG {LOC-2SG-convert to Islam-DUP} whether 2SG NC1-Christian.
'Whether you are an Animist, or you have converted to Islam, or you are a Christian.'

pan a-ag-i aw an bu?
FUT CD1.3SG-say-2SG.DO 2SG person how
'They will say to you, what kind of person are you?'

pan a-ag-i ñer aw bu-lago-i b-ay n-i-roren-e maa.
FUT CD1.3SG-say-2SG.DO so 2SG NC5A-pathway-2SG.POSS CD5-INT LOC-1SG-ask-PFV {like this}
'He will say to you, so what I am asking now is what your religion is'

w-o mati ú-ju u-jux. bare waf w-a-bab-baj.
CD6-PRO NEG.FUT 2SG-can 2SG-see but NC6.thing CD6-REL-have-DUP
‘But in our faith, it is said that there are many things that you cannot see. But those things exist'

baj-ut búox min a-nnax ala-é-mit
have-NEG COMPL COMPL CD1.3SG-wait of-NC3-sky
'It is out of the question that he waits for God'
