= BQJ =

BQJ or bqj may refer to:

- BQJ, the IATA code for Batagay Airport, Sakha Republic, Russia
- bqj, the ISO 639-3 code for Bandial language, Senegal
