= António Baticã Ferreira =

António Baticã Ferreira is a Manjaco poet. He was born in Canchungo in 1939. He attended high school in Paris, France and graduated with a degree in medicine from the University of Lausanne.
