= Gusilay language =

Jola language of Senegal

Gusilay
- Native to: Senegal
- Region: Tionk Essil
- Native speakers: 15,000 (2006)
- Language family: Niger–Congo?: Atlantic–Congo; Bak; Jola; Gusilay

Language codes
- ISO 639-3: gsl
- Glottolog: gusi1246
- ELP: Gusilay

Gusilay (Gusiilay, Gusilaay, Kusiilaay, Kusilay) is a Jola language of the Casamance region of Senegal.
