= Jola-Felupe language =

Jola language spoken in West Africa

Jola-Felupe
- Ejamat
- Native to: Guinea-Bissau, Senegal
- Region: Cacheu, Ziguinchor
- Native speakers: 38,000 (2017–2022)
- Language family: Niger–Congo?: Atlantic–Congo; Bak; Jola; Jola-Felupe
- Dialects: Ial; Budjim; Edjaten; Cassolol; Cortão; Suzana; Hassuca; Edjim; Ojifumo; Eossor; Bulol; Elalab
- Writing system: Latin

Language codes
- ISO 639-3: Either: eja – Ejamat hhr – Kerak
- Glottolog: here1250
- ELP: Ejamat

- Person: ɸuluɸ; ajamuʂay
- Language: ɛlɔp eluɸay; ɛlɔp ɛjamuʂay

Jola-Felupe (Feloup, Felup, Felupe, Floup, Flup, Fulup) or Ejamat (Ediamat) is a Jola language of the Casamance region of Senegal and neighboring Guinea-Bissau, including around Calequisse (Kaləkis), on the western edge of the Manjak area south of the Cacheu River. A person is called ɸuluɸ or ajamuʂay by speakers of the dialect, and the language is called either ɛlɔp eluɸay or ɛlɔp ɛjamuʂay (or Ejamatay in Husuy).

Kerak (Keerak, Keeraku; also Her) appears to be a dialect, though Ethnologue assigns it a separate ISO code due to early survey work which suggested it was more distinct.
