= Jola-Fonyi language =

Jola language spoken in West Africa

Jola-Fonyi
- kujóolay
- Native to: Gambia, Senegal
- Region: Casamance
- Native speakers: 480,000 (2019)
- Language family: Niger–Congo?: Atlantic–Congo; Bak; Jola; Jola-Fonyi
- Dialects: Buluf; Fonyi; Kombo; Kalounaye; Narang

Language codes
- ISO 639-3: dyo
- Glottolog: jola1263
- ELP: Jola-Fonyi

Jola (French: Diola; Jola: Joola), also called Jola-Fonyi (French: Diola-Fogny) and Kujamataak, is a language spoken by 475,000 people in the Casamance region of Senegal, and neighboring countries. Jola-Fonyi is one of several closely related Jola languages spoken in the area.

== Phonology ==
=== Consonants ===
		Labial	Alveolar	Palatal	Velar	Glottal
Stop/ Affricate	voiceless	p	t	t͡ʃ	k	
Stop/ Affricate	voiced	b	d	d͡ʒ	ɡ	
Nasal		m	n	ɲ	ŋ	
Fricative		f	s			h
Trill			r			
Lateral			l			
Approximant		w		j		

=== Vowels ===
	Front	Central	Back
Close	i		u
Near-close	ɪ		ʊ
Close-mid	e	ə	o
Open-mid	ɛ		ɔ
Open		a	

Vowel length is also phonemic.

== Writing System ==
=== In Senegal ===
In Senegal, the decree No. 2005-981 created the official orthography of Jola.

Jola Alphabet (Senegal)
Uppercase	A	B	C	D	E	F	G	H	I	J	K	L	M	N	Ñ	Ŋ	O	P	R	S	T	U	W	Y
Lowercase	a	b	c	d	e	f	g	h	i	j	k	l	m	n	ñ	ŋ	o	p	r	s	t	u	w	y

Long vowels are indicated by doubling the letter: <aa ee ii oo uu>. The acute accent over a vowel <á é í ó ú> indicates that the advanced and retracted tongue root for that vowel and the other vowels of the words by vowel harmony.

== Bibliography ==
- Hopkins, Bradley L. 1995. Contribution à une étude de la syntaxe Diola-Fogny. Cahiers de Recherche Linguistique, 4. Dakar: Société Internationale de Linguistique.
- Hopkins, Bradley and Elizabeth Hopkins. 1992. Apprentissage de la langue Diola-Fogny: Un cours pratique. Dakar: Société Internationale de Linguistique.

== See also ==
- Category:Diola-language films
