= Jola languages =

Dialect continuum spoken in Senegal, The Gambia and Guinea-Bissau

Jola
- Diola
- Geographic distribution: The Gambia, Senegal (esp. Casamance) and Guinea-Bissau
- Linguistic classification: Niger–Congo?: Atlantic–Congo; Senegambian; Bak–Bijago; Bak proper; Jola–Papel; Jola
- Subdivisions: Bayot; Jola proper

Language codes
- ISO 639-3: –
- Glottolog: jola1264

Jola (Joola) or Diola is a dialect continuum spoken in Senegal, the Gambia, and Guinea-Bissau. It belongs to the Bak branch of the Niger–Congo language family.

== Name ==
The name Jola is an exonym, and may be from the Mandinka word joolaa 'one who pays back'. There is no widespread endonym used by all of the Jola speakers.

== Languages ==
The primary branches of Jola proper and to some extent Central Jola are not mutually intelligible. The main varieties are:

- Bayot
- Jola proper
  - Kwatay (Kuwaataay), spoken along the coast south of the Casamance River.
  - Karon–Mlomp
    - Karon, spoken along the coast of Casamance south of Diouloulou.
    - Mlomp
  - Central Jola
    - Jola-Fonyi (Kujamatay), spoken around Bignona. The official standard.
    - Bandial, spoken in a small area south of the Casamance River.
    - Gusilay, spoken in the village of Thionck Essyl.
    - Jola-Felupe (Ediamat), spoken in a handful of villages south of Oussouye in Oussouye Department. Kerak may be a dialect.
    - (Jola) Kasa, spoken around Oussouye.

=== Bayot ===
Bayot, spoken around Ziguinchor, is grammatically Jola, apart from a non-Jola pronominal system. However, perhaps half its vocabulary is non-Jola and even non-Atlantic. It may therefore be a language isolate with substantial Jola borrowing (relexification). In any case, Bayot is clearly distinct from (other) Jola languages.

== Reconstruction ==
Some Proto-Joola reconstructions of stable lexical roots by Segerer (2016) are:

Gloss	Proto-Joola
to take	*-ŋar
to speak	*-lɔb
rain	*-lʊb
belly	*-ar
eye	*-kil
knee	*-juul
nose	*-ɲend
fat	*-tɔf
to die	*-kɛt
liver	*-iɲ
to bite	*-rʊm
mouth	*-tum
