= Bainuk people =

Ethnic group

Bainuk
Languages
- Banyum language, French language

Religion
- Majority: Islam Minority: African traditional religion

The Bainuk people (also called Banyuk, Banun, Banyun, Bainouk, Bainunk, Banyum, Bagnoun, Banhum, Banyung, Ñuñ, Elomay, or Elunay) are an ethnic group that today lives primarily in Senegal as well as in parts of Gambia and Guinea-Bissau.

== Etymology ==
The name Banyun is attributed to the Portuguese, who derived the word from Mandinka and applied it as a collective name for a number of groups settled at strategic sites along waterways, portages, and trade paths between the Gambia and Cacheu rivers.... Possibly Banyun served as a generic term for "trader," much as dyula identifies Mande traders engaged in long-distance commerce (Map 9).

Mandinka oral history from the Pakao area of the middle Casamance records that the name "Bainouk" was a pejorative term, first used after the Mandinka defeated them battle in the late 16th century, meaning "those who are chased away," from the Mandinka word "bai" meaning "chase away."

== History ==
The Bainuk are believed to have been the first inhabitants of the lower Casamance River. Some oral histories claim that the land as empty before their arrival, but also date the arrival to the 11th century CE, while archaeological finds show human occupation of the region to be much older. The Bainuk as such may have been formed by a merger between original inhabitants who had lived in Casamance for centuries and newcomers from the Tenda areas to the east, pushed west by the rising Mali Empire. This gave rise to the eastern Banyun, the Ijaxer, who joined the Gunyun and Nanyun, or western Banyun.

In the fifteenth century, there were at least five Bainuk states including Bichangor, Jase, Foni, and Buguando. The Bainuk were also a major component of the population of the Kasa kingdom. They dominated the area between the Cacheu River and the Gambia, but were progressively pushed westward by the Mandinka, Balanta and Jola peoples.

The Bainuk states dominated the riverine and coastal trade in the region, heavily restricting the activities of Portuguese traders and denying them access to inland trade routes. At the end of the 16th century they relaxed this policy as part of collaboration with the Portuguese against Kasa, but gradually clamped back down afterwards. In 1830 the Bainuk kingdom, a vassal of Kaabu, was destroyed by a Balanta invasion.

In modern times the Bainuk have heavily adopted Mande and Jola cultural customs. There is supposedly a curse on the Bainuk, laid by a tyrannical king upon his execution by his rebellious subjects, which pushes some people to downplay their origins and language. Others, however, are reclaiming Bainuk heritage and preserving their history.

== Culture ==
Many Bainuk are adherents of Islam, a process that began around the 17th century due to the influence of Muslim Mande scholars and merchants settling in the region. Some also practice their traditional animistic religion. The Kumpo was originally a Bainuk tradition, mixed with Mande concepts, that has been adopted by the Jola.

The Bainuk are known as skilled dyers and weavers.

== Sources ==
- Clark, Andrew F. and Lucie Colvin Phillips, Historical Dictionary of Senegal (Metuchen, New Jersey: Scarecrow Press, 1994) p. 73, 179.
- Barry, Boubacar. Senegambia and the Atlantic Salve Trade (Cambridge: University Press, 1998), p. 21
- Mane, Idrissa (2021). "Les Banun: espaces, origines, et formation". In Fall, Mamadou; Fall, Rokhaya; Mane, Mamadou (eds.). Bipolarisation du Senegal du XVIe - XVIIe siecle (in French). Dakar: HGS Editions. pp. 317–376.
