= Bayot language =

Jola language spoken in Senegal

Bayot
- Native to: Senegal, Guinea-Bissau
- Region: Ziguinchor, Cacheu
- Native speakers: 35,000 (2021–2022)
- Language family: Niger–Congo?: Atlantic–Congo; Senegambian; Bak–Bijago; Jola–Papel; Jola (or isolate?); Bayot
- Dialects: Essin; Kugere
- Writing system: Latin

Language codes
- ISO 639-3: bda
- Glottolog: bayo1262
- ELP: Bayot

Bayot is a language of southern Senegal, southwest of Ziguinchor in a group of villages near Nyassia, and in northwestern Guinea-Bissau, along the Senegalese border, and in the Gambia.

The Kugere and Kuxinge (Essin) dialects of Senegal and the Arame (Edamme) and Gubaare dialects of Guinea-Bissau are distinct enough to be sometimes considered different languages.

Bayot is the most divergent of the Jola languages, in the Senegambian branch of the Atlantic–Congo language family.

Bayot is grammatically Jola, apart from a non-Jola pronominal system. However, perhaps half its vocabulary is non-Jola and even non-Atlantic. It may therefore be a language isolate with substantial Jola borrowing (relexification). In any case, Bayot is clearly distinct from (other) Jola languages.
