= Manjak people =

West African ethnic group

Manjaco
Total population
- 147,000 (2022)

Languages
- Manjak, French, Portuguese

Religion
- Majority: Catholicism, Minority: Islam

Manjak people or the Manjaco (Manjak: Manjaku; French: Mandjak; Portuguese: Manjaco; Wolof: Njaago; Jola: Manjago) are a West African ethnic group who primarily reside in Guinea-Bissau with smaller communities in The Gambia and Senegal. The Manjaco constitute about 14% of the population of Guinea-Bissau. Within Guinea-Bissau, the people primarily live in the Bassarel and Babok areas in the northern coastal Cacheu Region.

== Language ==
The Manjak language is classified as part of the Bak languages, which is a branch of Niger–Congo.

== History ==
=== Pre-colonization ===
Based on early Portuguese records and observations, the Manjaco power structure and society was robust and well established. The people lived in a semi-feudal system where villages were under the subjugation of a leader and that leader reported to the king of the Bassarel and Babok areas, referred to as the King of Bassarel. The king of Bassarel presided over a federation of areas some of which were more prosperous and had a greater population than the Bassarel, but nonetheless still reported to the King. The King and aristocracy maintained a higher standard of living through relatively heavy taxation of their subjects as the majority of people participated in the production of rice.

The Manjaco along with other groups developed a unique system of agriculture unique to West Africa referred to as, Bolanhas in Portuguese. The system entails a series of dikes, drainage canals, and rice paddies within mangrove swamps to cultivate rice. Early Portuguese explorers in the area were highly impressed by the complexity and efficiency of these agricultural systems.

=== Portuguese Colonization ===
While the Portuguese colonists most likely made contact with the Manjaco as early as the late 15th century the colonists did not enter the interior lands of Guinea-Bissau and therefore they did not have extensive contact with the Manjaco for much of the colonial history. However, during this initial period Portuguese authorities living in Cacheu gave tribute to the Manjaco leaders. The Manjaco retained their autonomy until 1913 when a military group of Fula and Mandiga soldiers led by Portuguese officers attacked and conquered the territory of the Manjaco. For the following year, other ethnic groups, often led by Portuguese soldiers, destroyed many of the farms and houses before more secure Portuguese Colonial control was established.

During the period of 1914-1974, the Portuguese maintained full control of the region through use of the military and actively disliked the Manjaco because of how difficult they were to control. The Portuguese perceived the Manjaco as superior to other West African groups because of their excellent work ethic, rich homelands filled with rice paddies and palm oil forests, and peanut farms but the free spirit and general stubborn attitude of the Manjaco angered the Colonizers. During Colonial times the Manjaco voted against their chiefs and the Portuguese for greater freedoms and when they were not successful tended to choose to work as migrant laborers in French Senegal or British Gambia where there were superior economic opportunities. By the 1940s about a fifth of all Manjaco worked outside of Portuguese Guinea and this led to the decay of rice paddy infrastructure which was critical to the Portuguese colonial economy. This number of migrant workers increased to a third of all working age Manjaco by the 1950s. The Portuguese authority had a goal of subduing the Manjaco and turning them into productive workers for the economy but were never successful in this endeavor.

=== Independence and Modern Times ===
One of the catalyzing events for the independence movement occurred in 1959 when dockworkers in Bissau went on strike and over 50 Africans were killed during the unrest, many of the people being Manjaco. This event is known as the Pidjiguiti Massacre and led to the formation of one of the principal groups behind independence, the nationalist party or PAIGC. Despite the murder of Manjaco people in this event the group participated very little in the fight for independence. Rather than choosing to fight with the Portuguese or the PAIGC many young Manjaco men chose instead to flee to nearby Senegal for better work opportunities and a more stable life. The exodus of Manjaco men coupled with a long period of drought during the fight against colonial rule many of the rice paddies fell into disrepair and were destroyed by sea water.

Once independence was achieved the new government radically shifted the power structures of Manjaco society. During colonization, the Portuguese authority had utilized the traditional power structures to attempt to implement their policies and these structures became associated and tied to the colonial government. Based on their association with the colonists the new government stripped the Manjaco King of authority and the aristocracy of their titled rice fields and turned the fields over to the people who farmed them. This action by the new independent government essentially stripped the King of his authority.

== Political history ==
=== Historical political structures ===
Historical political structures centered around the production of rice in wet fields and therefore the ownership of those fields. People tended to live in clusters and would rent rice fields from their neighbors who controlled them. These local landowners then reported to a system of people above them who they paid with a portion of the rice harvest. This group, directly above the direct rice production, then reported to a series of leaders who presided over the Bassarel areas. The leaders pledged their allegiance to the King of Bassarel. During this period prior to colonization, the system was relatively stable and independent of outside control. Additionally, there was significantly less emigration of Manjaco people.

=== Current political attitudes and current organizations ===
The Manjaco, in general, are relatively apathetic to politics and tend not to be involved in politics. Political attitudes during colonization and during independence have remained relatively stable and the Manjaco have tended to focus on a few key elements of government. Manjaco tend to move around within the country and abroad for better work opportunities and have been doing this since the early 20th century and therefore the governmental system is viewed as either a positive system providing documents to travel or a negative system which hinders movement. The next aspect of government the Manjaco tend to care about is the services the government can provide such as education and healthcare. These attitudes meant that the Manjaco generally had little opinion on the independence movement and rather supported whichever government would more greatly benefit them and their lifestyle.

==== Culture Development Club ====
The Culture Development Club is a unique social change group developed in the 1980s in the Bassarel region. The group is formed of young Manjaco men with two explicit goals. First, they wanted to reverse the trend of young men leaving village life and therefore make life attractive for young men by exemplifying certain elements of Manjaco culture. Their other goal is to get rid of certain aspects of Manjaco culture that the group viewed as backwards and contributed to the exodus of young men from village life. Importantly, the group does not envision their work as a new concept, instead, they believe they are fulfilling the role young Manjaco men used to fulfill or working to improve village life. However, these youth while creating impact are a small sect of society and the majority of their peers are still opting to move abroad or outside of the homeland for better opportunities.

The organization found its roots from old Manjaco practices of banju or spaces for young unmarried men to live and discuss village life as well as catholic missionaries who encouraged youth to perform cultural skits. The club then morphed with the wake of the revolution and became aligned with revolutionary politics supporting independence but soon after Portuguese forces left the group disaffiliated with the nationalist party on account that the Manjaco had remained non-aligned during the conflict.

The group has done significant work in the region to achieve their goals. For example, members of the club have helped elderly farmers in the community at a discounted to rate to help them complete their harvest and sustain the farm. To aid mothers and their children in the village, the group cultivated crops and offered the seeds at a lower price point to the mothers with the goal in mind they could begin to grow their own plots for food. Furthermore, the money they earned from these ventures went to purchasing school supplies for local children and hosting club events.

== Kambatch of 1986 ==
A Kambatch is a tradition among the men of the Manjaco that occurs every quarter century. During this ceremony men are initiated to the group and engage in a government style discussion over what customs and traditions should be revisited, changed or abolished. At the Kambatch of 1986 the men decided to change two things about Manjaco society, the practice of groom service and the existence of a cult of divination.

In Manjaco society groom service was the practice of young boys or men going to work in the fields of their future bride's family. Usually, a few years prior to marriage Manjaco adolescents would begin work in the future partner's fields. During this period, the future husbands would live in a shared living space together solely for young men. However, when the practice was officially disbanded it had already been widely out of practice in favor of eloping, emigration, or paying a fine at the local temple to avoid the practice. At the Kambatch, the men decided on a new practice of consent from both parties as the criteria to become married.

The cult of divination was a group of Manjaco women who claimed to be human vessels for evil spirits. The leaders of the group claimed the spirits within them could provide information about why certain women were infertile or had chosen to commit infanticide. During the Kambatch, the men decided that the women had no proof of the convictions they were placing on other women and the men believed some of these convictions might have been for personal gain.

== Religious and spiritual practices ==
=== Religion ===
The majority of Manjaco practice two religions with the majority adhering to Christianity, specifically Catholicism while a small minority follow Islam. However, many of the youth have become skeptical of animism and the prominent role that spirits play in society.

=== Ancestors ===
Many Manjaco households within the traditional homeland have an ancestor shrine made up of carved wooden posts which represent people, these are referred to as pitchap. The carved posts while appearing to represent individual people, as interpreted by the Portuguese colonists, are actually collectivist representations of ancestors in general. When Manjaco make offerings they refer to a single ancestor despite the shrines representing ancestors collectively. An important distinction to make is how the Manjaco regard their ancestors in comparison to other cultures. Rather than revering ancestors and treating them as guides to moral superiority, the Manjaco tend to subjugate their ancestors and incorporate them back into society as relative equals.

During offerings and the asking of questions to ancestors the Manjaco begin by pouring water and then palm wine on the shrines. The conversations cannot be initiated by a woman and women must have a man start the conversation before they are able to talk with the ancestor shrine. Men and women also differ in what must be relayed and communicated to the ancestors. Men in general ask for peace over the household and have short remarks while women tend to discuss the daily occurrences and keep the ancestors updated on village and family life through lengthy conversations.

Despite prominent Manjaco communities outside of the Bassarel and Babok regions this type of shrine is very rare outside the homeland. When Manjaco die abroad or outside their community they are reborn back home as an ancestor in their town in a shrine.

== Practices of body modification ==
=== Female scarification ===
Prior to the 1960s the practice of female scarification was quite common among the Manjaco, but the practice largely went away as Portuguese presence increased in the region and Portuguese ethnographers of the time tied this to the Manjaco seeing more civilized ways of living and abandoning old ways of life. Female scarification was the process of intricately scarring the torsos of women. The other members of society often drew patterns on the women and the patterns tended to focus on women's breasts. Ethnographic research conducted during 1936 by the then governor of Portuguese Guinea, Antonio de Carvalho Viegas, and a subsequent study in 1960 by A. Martins de Meireles, decided that there was little to no meaning behind the scarification. The Portuguese officials thought that the scarification was simply a decoration for women's bodies. In the 1960 study, Meireles surveyed over 42,224 Manjaco people (18.452 men and 23,772 women) or about 56% of the then assumed population of the Manjaco. He looked for female scarification in the people to make claims about it and found it was significantly more prevalent in the older generations of women. The practice of female scarification is well documented from an Austrian photographer, Hugo Bernatzik, who travelled the region photographing the people but took many photos of bare chested women to document scarification.

== Notable people ==
- Ansu Fati, Spanish footballer
- Ansumane Faty, Bissau-Guinean footballer
- António Baticã Ferreira, Bissau-Guinean poet
- Alfred Gomis, Senegalese footballer
- Bafétimbi Gomis, French footballer
- Kafétien Gomis, French long jumper
- Alexandre Mendy, Bissau-Guinean footballer
- Arnaud Mendy, Bissau-Guinean footballer
- Benjamin Mendy, French footballer
- Bernard Mendy, French footballer
- Edouard Mendy, Senegalese footballer
- Emmanuel Mendy, Bissau-Guinean footballer
- Ferland Mendy, French footballer
- Frédéric Mendy, Bissau-Guinean footballer
- Jacob Mendy, Gambian footballer
- Nampalys Mendy, Senegalese footballer
- Saná Gomes
- Boubacar Hanne
- Janio Bikel
- Jefferson Encada
- Carlos Mendes Gomes, Spanish footballer
- Américo Gomes, Guinean singer
- DIP Doundou Guiss, born Dominique Preira, Senegalese rapper

== See also ==
- Demographics of Senegal
- Languages of Senegal
- List of African ethnic groups
