= Kajandu =

Fulcrum shovel used by the Jola people

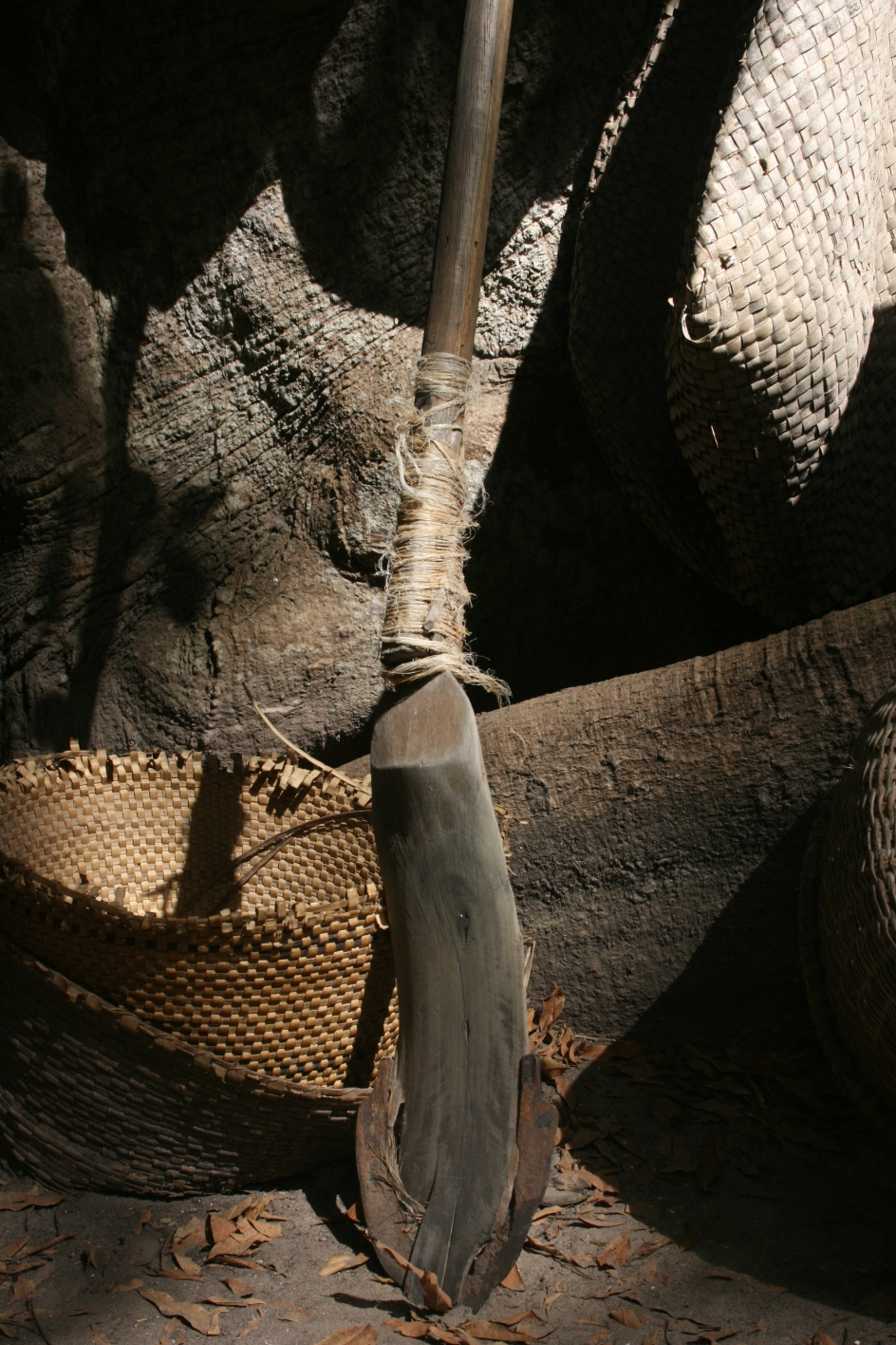
The lower part of a kayendo ends in a sharp wrought iron blade.

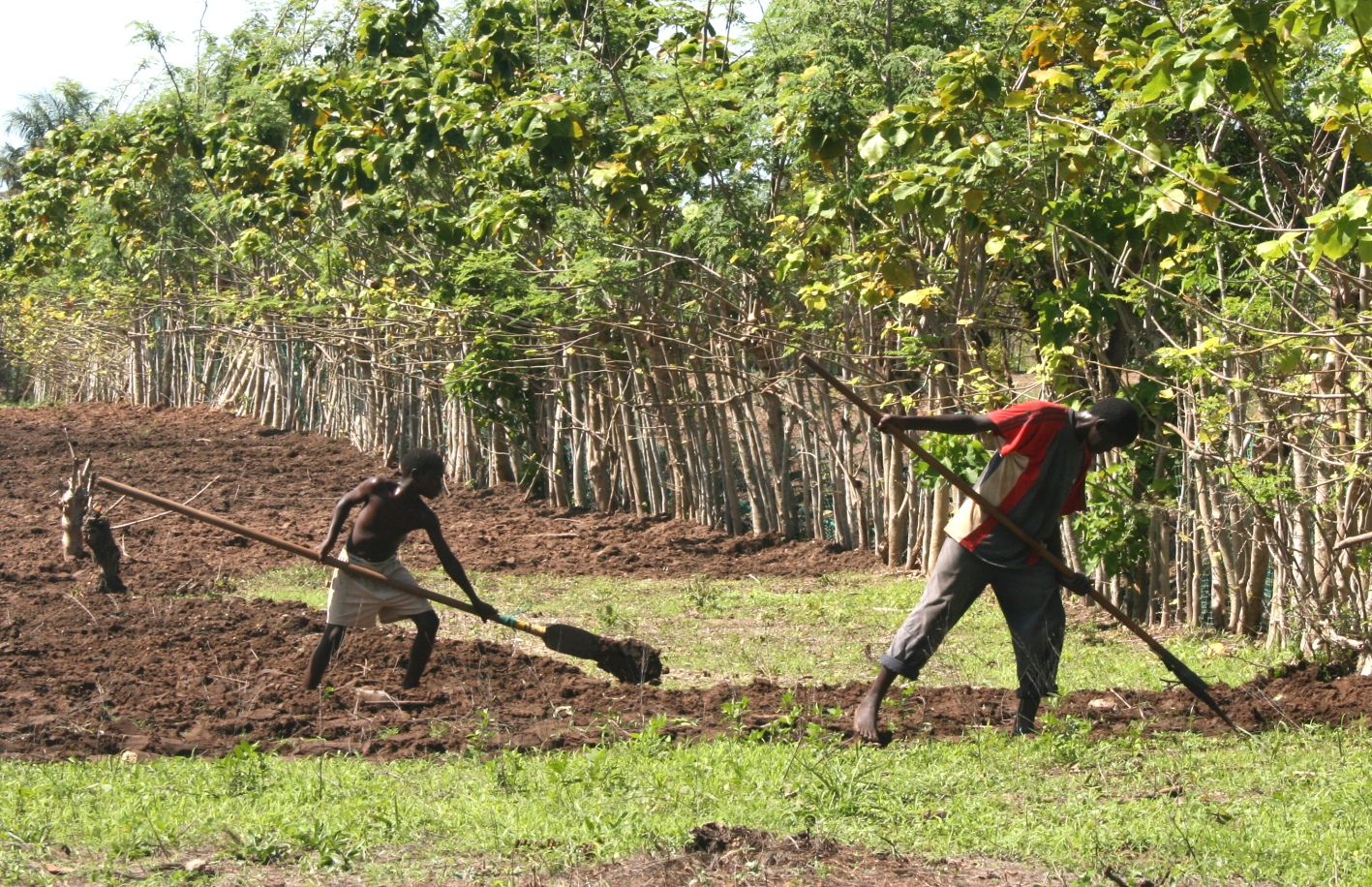
The tool in use, tilling a rice field

Kajandu (also written kayendo, kajendo, kadiendo, or kadiandou) is a long-handled fulcrum shovel used by the Jola (Diola) people of Senegal, Gambia, and Guinea-Bissau to till and prepare rice paddy fields. It is also used to make dikes and furrows. It consists of a long wooden shaft, 1.6–3.5 metres long, and a large flat or concave wooden blade with iron edges. The long shaft rests on the knee and is used to lift up pieces of earth. Typically men use the kajandu while women sow, replant, spread manure and harvest.

Use of the Kajandu was recorded in 1455 and was described in detail in 1685 by Sieur de la Courbe. It is similar to the kop or cop used by the Baga people.

== See also ==
- Carabane#Rice cultivation
