= P with stroke =

Letter of the Latin alphabet

- Ᵽ ᵽ

Usage
- Writing system: Latin script
- Type: alphabetic
- Language of origin: Tanimuca-Retuarã language, Americanist phonetic notation, Bandial
- Sound values: [ɸ]
- In Unicode: U+1D7D, U+2C63

History
Development
D21
              - 𐌐
                - P p
                  - Ᵽ ᵽ
- Time period: 1987 to present

Other
- Writing direction: Left-to-Right

Ᵽ (minuscule: ᵽ) or "P with stroke" is a letter of the Latin alphabet, formed from P with the addition of a stroke, usually through the bowl but sometimes through the descender. It is used in some phonetic transcription systems, such as the Americanist phonetic notation, to represent a fricative [ɸ].

In 1987 ᵽ was adopted for writing the Tanimuca-Retuarã language, where it represents either a fricative or a stop depending on the dialect.

P with stroke through descender in Doulos SIL

There is also a P with stroke through descender Ꝑ (minuscule: ꝑ) used in the medieval period as a scribal abbreviation for per, par-, por-.

== Encoding ==
The minuscule form, U+1D7D ᵽ LATIN SMALL LETTER P WITH STROKE was added to Unicode 4.1 in 2005, while the majuscule U+2C63 Ᵽ LATIN CAPITAL LETTER P WITH STROKE was added to version 5.0 in 2006.

Character information
Preview	Ᵽ		ᵽ		Ꝑ		ꝑ	
Unicode name	LATIN CAPITAL LETTER P WITH STROKE		LATIN SMALL LETTER P WITH STROKE		LATIN CAPITAL LETTER P WITH STROKE THROUGH DESCENDER		LATIN SMALL LETTER P WITH STROKE THROUGH DESCENDER	
Encodings	decimal	hex	dec	hex	dec	hex	dec	hex
Unicode	11363	U+2C63	7549	U+1D7D	42832	U+A750	42833	U+A751
UTF-8	226 177 163	E2 B1 A3	225 181 189	E1 B5 BD	234 157 144	EA 9D 90	234 157 145	EA 9D 91
Numeric character reference	&#11363;	&#x2C63;	&#7549;	&#x1D7D;	&#42832;	&#xA750;	&#42833;	&#xA751;
