= Casamance Creole =

Portuguese-based creole in Casamance, Senegal

- Kriyol
- Region: Casamance, Senegal and Gambia
- Native speakers: 50,000-55,000 (1963)
- Language family: Portuguese Creole: Afro-portuguese; Upper Guinea; Guinea-Bissau Creole; Casamance Creole

Official status
- Official language in: None states.

Language codes
- ISO 639-3: –
- Glottolog: cach1242

The Casamance Creole or Cacheu-Ziguinchor Creole also Portuguis Creole is a Portuguese-based creole language that is considered a dialect of Guinea-Bissau Creole spoken mainly in the Casamance region of Senegal and also in The Gambia.

== History ==
Guinea-Bissau was discovered by the Portuguese in 1446, but it was only in 1588 that Cacheu was founded, the first Portuguese settlement, administratively dependent on Cape Verde, together with Casamance (currently belonging to Senegal), which was part of the Portuguese colony of Guinea-Bissau until 1886, Time when, following the Berlin Conference, a convention leads Portugal to cede the city of Ziguinchor and the region of Casamance to France.

Despite the establishment of borders with the French government in 1886, when Ziguinchor ceased to be under Portuguese rule, the local population continued to speak a variety of Cacheu Creole, influenced by Guinea-Bissau Creole (both varieties of Guinea-Bissau Creole), but with its own grammatical and lexical characteristics.

The Fijus di Terra were the owners of the land, they differentiated themselves from other ethnic groups by their Creole language, their Catholic religion and their European manners, habits and clothing. Perhaps the most prominent feature of this population was the well-known Ziguinchor Sunday in which people went to mass and walked elegantly in jackets and hats through the streets and gardens of Ziguinchor. Therefore, for the French, the Creoles were the interlocutors par excellence with the rest of the inhabitants, And they themselves were forced to learn Creole, a language that was much easier than other native languages for a European to learn. Even the employees from the northern region that the French sent because they were more educated than those from the south, quickly learned to speak Creole, this was the language most spoken by the inhabitants, and even the other ethnicities in the region learned Creole through be the language of commerce. Not only due to the proximity to Guinea-Bissau and the smuggling that took place between the two countries, but also due to the local market trade that attracted peasants from the interior.

Currently, ties with Guinea-Bissau are still very strong, including family, social, religious and ethnic ties, such that in 1985 in a questionnaire, 70% responded that they had already visited Guinea-Bissau. And even though the Ziguinchor Creole is similar to the Cacheu Creole, the influence of the Bissau Creole is still present in Ziguinchor. In addition to the fijus di terra coming from Guinea-Bissau mainly during the colonial war, many refugees, such as the Mandjak, the Manggne and the Pépel, also reinforced the Creole population. In the richest families, it is still tradition to marry members of those from Bissau or Cacheu. In a pyramid that illustrates the social structure of Ziguinchor, four pillars can be placed: at the highest, the fijios di fidalgu, followed by the fijus di terra, then the Madjak coming from Guinea-Bissau and finally the other local ethnicities.

During the 1950s there was an exodus from the countryside to the outskirts of Ziguinchor, and Creole became the language of inter-ethnic communication, and it was predicted that this would be a way of homogenizing the south of Senegal, Casamance, On the other hand, Christian missions also used Creole as a liturgical language, which meant that it had more support in the church for its strengthening and dissemination.

In censuses carried out in 1963, of the 42 thousand inhabitants of Ziguinchor, 35 thousand spoke Creole (83% of the total population), and 30 thousand had Creole as their mother tongue (71.4%).

After 75 years of French rule and 37 years of independence, the Creoles of Ziguinchor are still known as "Les portuguais" - "Portuguese" among the local population. However, with the growth of the city and the appearance of suburbs, it took the land away from the fijus di terra, leaving them completely in poverty. After independence the situation changed completely, the Creoles were seen as accomplices of the French. The public positions held by Creoles were replaced by officials from the northern region who spoke the Wulofe language, and thus began the decline of the Creole population of Ziguinchor, who were always the majority. So much so that in 1985 only 37% of children attending school spoke Creole.

The ethnic and cultural differences between the people of Casamance, of which Ziguinchor is the capital, and the people of the northern region of Senegal, who are mostly Wuolofe, are very large, a reason that has led Casamance to fight for its independence for some years now (since 1982). Many historians see this as a legacy of the Portuguese-French conflicts over the territory, which Guinea-Bissau and Senegal inherited. The interference of Senegalese troops in Guinean territory is known, but we also have to take into account the great emotional bond that links the populations of Casamance and Guinea-Bissau, the latter trying to serve as a mediator in the armed conflict between the rebels of the Armed Forces Movement of Casamance, but Guinea-Bissau's neutrality was never very secure and the truth is that the Guinean army has been supplying weapons to the movement led by a priest of Creole origin Sengor (Sir!). The Fijus di Terra ended up supporting the rebels and have therefore been culturally exterminated, and on the other hand they face imposed Senegalese assimilation. Being a Creole was a privileged status that has already begun to disappear, as it has become secondary in relation to the Uolofes who previously did not even exist in the region. This region is essentially inhabited by Mandinga, Diola and Pépel people, these are not confined to the territory of Casamance, maintaining a territorial connection with Guinea-Bissau.

== Characteristics ==
Casamance Creole is part of the Portuguese-based Creoles of Upper Guinea, which also include Creoles from Cape Verde (varieties from Barlavento and Sotavento), and Guinea-Bissau.

This creole language was formed from contact between the Portuguese and native inhabitants of the Casamance region from the 15th century to the end of the 19th century, this language synthesized Portuguese and local cultures. The Creole spoken in Ziguinchor is the same type as that of the Cacheu region (Guinea-Bissau, a country that is just a few kilometers away from this city), with some terms inherited from French, although it is mutually intelligible with Guinean Creoles and even Cape Verdeans.

The connections between the Creole population of Casamance and Guinea-Bissau are so great that even in Ziguinchor the influence of the Creole from the city of Bissau can be seen. The Casamance Creole speaking population is around 50 or 55 thousand, mostly inhabitants of Ziguinchor, but many speakers are still found in other cities located in Casamance and also in The Gambia.

The creoles spoken in Guinea-Bissau and Casamance are considered the same language, however there are differences resulting from the dominance of Casamance being transferred from the Portuguese to the French in 1886. This historical-political condition meant that the Casamanceans began to interact more with other Senegalese than with Guineans.

== Use ==
Currently, this Portuguese-based creole is spoken in the Casamance region mainly in Ziguinchor, where it is used as a first or second language by the majority of inhabitants and names such as da Silva, Carvalho or Fonseca are common.

In fact, it is believed that the name of the city of Ziguinchor itself is derived from the Portuguese language from the expression "I arrived and cried", this is because the natives, upon seeing the European boats arriving, cried because they would be sold as slaves.

This language was also favored in the region when the Creole language became associated with identification with the Christian religion, as opposed to surrounding religions.

== Examples ==
Below is the "Our Father" in English, Portuguese and Casamance Creole:

- English

Our Father, Who art in heaven, Hallowed be Thy Name. Thy Kingdom come. Thy Will be done, on earth as it is in Heaven. Give us this day our daily bread. And forgive us our trespasses, as we forgive those who trespass against us. And lead us not into temptation, but deliver us from evil. Amen.

- Portuguese

Pai Nosso, que estais nos Céus, santificado seja o Vosso nome, venha a nós o Vosso reino, seja feita a Vossa vontade assim na Terra como no Céu. O pão nosso de cada dia nos dai hoje. Perdoai-nos as nossas ofensas assim como nós perdoamos a quem nos tem ofendido, e não nos deixeis cair em tentação, mas livrai-nos do mal, Amen.

- Casamance Creole

No Pape ki stana seu Pa bu nomi santificadu Pa bu renu thiga Pa bu bontadi fasidu riba di tera suma na seu Partinu aos pom di kada dia Purdanu no pekadus, suma no ta purda kilas ki iara nu ka bu disanu no kai na tentasom Ma libranu di mal Amen.

== See also ==
- Guinea-Bissau Creole
- Cape Verdean Creole
- Portuguese-based creole languages
