= Mbour Sign Language =

Sign language in Senegal

- Native to: Senegal
- Region: M'Bour
- Language family: Deaf-community sign language

Language codes
- ISO 639-3: None (mis)
- Glottolog: mbou1245

Mbour Sign Language (French: Langue des signes de M'bour) is an indigenous sign language used in a neighborhood of the city of M'Bour in Senegal. Deaf people in the neighborhood meet regularly.
