= Kwatay language =

Divergent Jola language spoken in Senegal

Kwatay
- Kuwaataay
- Native to: Senegal
- Native speakers: 6,200 (2006)
- Language family: Niger–Congo?: Atlantic–Congo; Bak; Jola; Jola Proper; Kwatay

Language codes
- ISO 639-3: cwt
- Glottolog: kuwa1246
- ELP: Kuwaataay

Waat
- Person: a-waat, a-jɛmbɛrɛŋ
- People: ɛ-waat
- Language: ɛlɔp ɛjɛmbɛrɛŋay; bahamin buwaatay
- Country: juwaat

Kwatay (Kuwaataay) is a divergent Jola language of Senegal.

The Diembereng dialect is spoken on a southern coastal island of the same name, located in the Casamance River delta. A person is referred to as a-jɛmbɛrɛŋ or a-waat, and people are referred to as ɛ-waat. Their territory is known as juwaat. The language is called ɛlɔp ɛjɛmbɛrɛŋay and bahamin buwaatay, where ɛlɔp and presumably bahamin mean 'language'.
