= Karon language =

Endangered Jola language of West Africa

Karon
- Native to: Senegal, Gambia
- Region: Southwest Senegal coast
- Native speakers: 15,000 (2007)
- Language family: Niger–Congo?: Atlantic–Congo; Bak; Jola; Jola Proper; Karon–Mlomp; Karon

Language codes
- ISO 639-3: krx
- Glottolog: karo1294

Kalɔɔn
- Person: alɔɔn
- Language: kägup kɔlɔɔnay

The Karon or Kalɔɔn language is an endangered language of Senegal and Gambia. It belongs to the Bak branch of the Niger–Congo language family, and is particularly closely related to the Mlomp language.

Karon is spoken in a coastal area north of the mouth of the Casamance River. A person is called alɔɔn in the language, and speakers refer to their own language as kägup kɔlɔɔnay.

== Phonology ==
=== Consonants ===
| | | Labial | Alveolar | Palatal | Velar | Glottal |
|---|---|---|---|---|---|---|
| Stop | voiceless | p | t | tʃ | k | ʔ |
| Stop | prenasal | ᵐp | ⁿt | ᶮtʃ | ᵑk | |
| Nasal | plain | m | n | ɲ | | |
| Nasal | tense | mː | | ɲː | | |
| Fricative | | f | s | | | h |
| Lateral | | | l | | | |
| Approximant | | w | | j | | |

=== Vowels ===
| | Front | | Central | | Back | |
| | oral | nasal | oral | nasal | oral | nasal |
|---|---|---|---|---|---|---|
| Close | i iː | ĩ | | | u uː | ũ |
| Mid | e eː | ẽ | | | o oː | õ |
| Open | | | a aː | ã | | |

Advanced tongue root is marked with an acute accent /á/.
