= Thionck Essyl =

Thionck Essyl Tionk Essil
- Town and commune
- Location within Senegal
- Coordinates: 12°47′8″N 16°31′18″W
- Country: Senegal
- Region: Ziguinchor
- Department: Bignona

Government

Area
  - Town and commune: 5.802 km^{2} (2.240 sq mi)
- Elevation: 16 m (52 ft)

Population (2023 census)
  - Town and commune: 8,961
  - Density: 1,544/km^{2} (4,000/sq mi)
- Time zone: UTC±00:00

Thionck Essyl (also called Tionk Essil) is a small town and urban commune in Ziguinchor, Senegal, located 65 km north-west of the region capital.

== Etymology ==
The name of the town means "cook remaining crouched."

== History ==
The origins of the town are connected to the kingdom of Mof-Ewi, when it was populated by defectors from Guinea-Bissau. Long considered the largest village in Senegal, the village was urbanized in 1990.

== Administration ==
Thionck Essyl is part of the arrondissement of Tendouck in Bignona, Ziguinchor.

== Geography ==
The nearest towns are Hilol, Mantat, Etouta, Mlomp, Tendouck, and Djimande.

=== Population ===
The population is primarily Jola. Some sources suggest that more than 10000 people live in Thionck Essyl, however the census of 2002 stated that the town's population was only 8006 living in 1021 households. According to official estimates, the population was supposed to reach 8507 by the end of 2007. According to PEPAM (Water and Sanitation Program for the Millennium), however, there are currently 6954 people and 968 households in Thionck Essyl.

=== Economy ===
The borders of the town do not lend themselves to easy growth. The town hospital is not very functional because of the law budget, there remains 2 doctors, of the more than 10 there were. There is a high school in the town.

== See also ==
=== Bibliography ===
- Annie Cheneau-Loquay (1979). Thionck-Essyl en Basse Casamance. Évolution récente de la gestion des ressources renouvelables (in French). Université de Bordeaux III. p. 336.
- Michel Sagna (2003). Alphabétisation, lutte contre la pauvreté et développement effets du programme Caravane de l'alphabétisation au Sénégal sur les populations et le milieu rural sénégalais : cas des localités de Thionck Essyl et Pare Cissé (in French). Ottawa: National Library of Canada/Bibliothèque nationale du Canada. ISBN 0-612-72603-7.
- Mathilde Krul (1989). Projekten en leiders in Thionck-Essyl, Senegal (in Dutch). Vrije Universiteit.
