= Oussouye =

- Town and commune
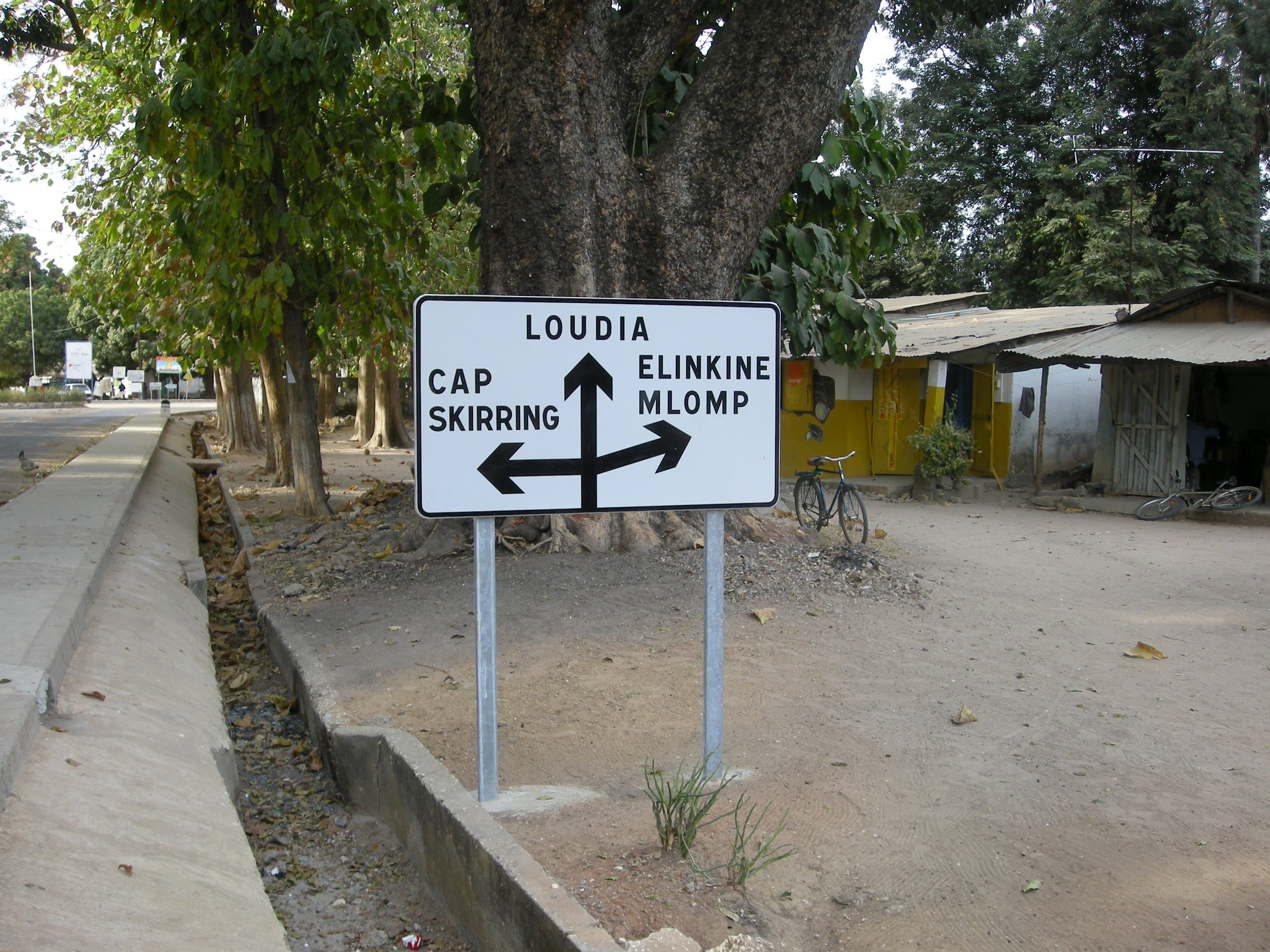
- Oussouye

- Location within Senegal
- Coordinates: 12°29′06″N 16°32′49″W
- Country: Senegal
- Region: Ziguinchor Region
- Department: Oussouye

Area
  - Town and commune: 4.158 km^{2} (1.605 sq mi)

Population
  - Town and commune: 5,705
  - Density: 1,372/km^{2} (3,554/sq mi)
- Time zone: UTC+0 (GMT)

Oussouye (or Husuy in Jola) is a small town and urban commune in the Oussouye Department in the Ziguinchor Region of Senegal. It lies in the area of Basse Casamance in the south of the country.

In the census of 2002, Oussouye had 4,828 inhabitants. In the census of 2023 it had risen to 5,705.

Kasa, a Jola language, is spoken in Oussouye.

The residence of the Prefect at Oussouye is a classified historic site.
