= Canchungo =

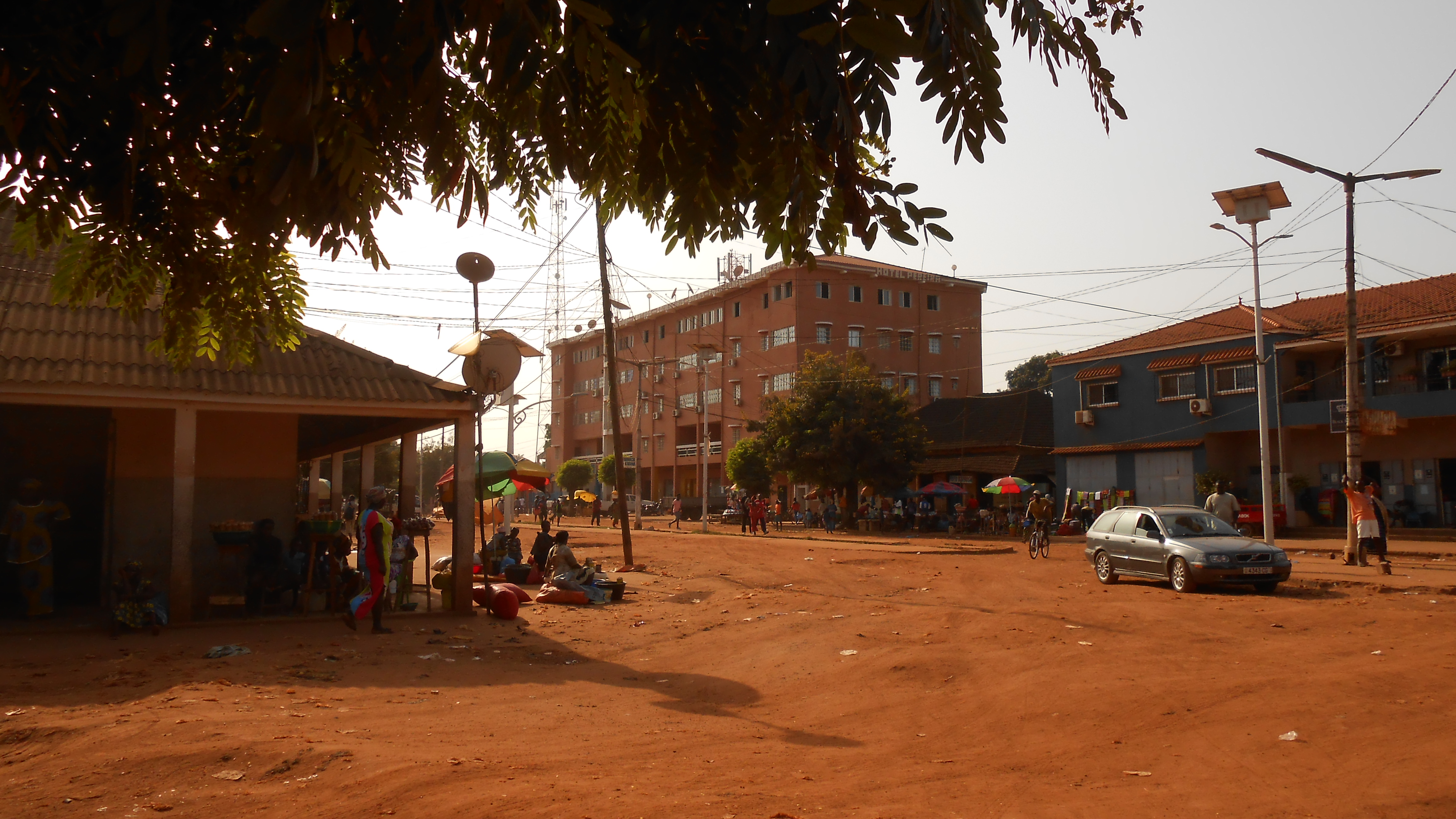
- The centre of Canchungo next to the former Teixeira Pinto square.

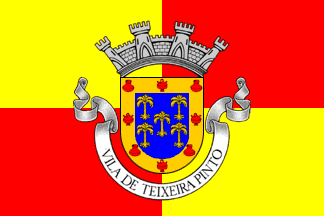
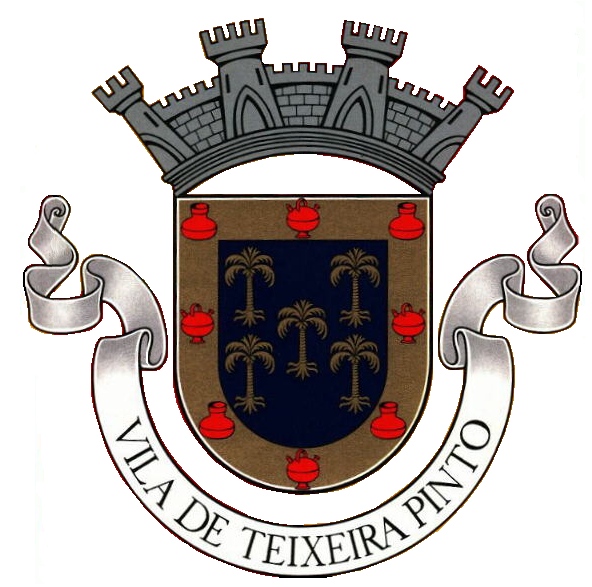
- Flag Coat of arms

- Location in Guinea-Bissau
- Coordinates: 12°4′2″N 16°2′0″W
- Country: Guinea-Bissau
- Region: Cacheu Region

Population (2008 est.)
  - Total: 6,434
  - Ethnicities: Manjak people

Canchungo is a town located in the western Cacheu Region of Guinea-Bissau formerly known as Vila Teixeira Pinto after Major João Teixeira Pinto, the Portuguese colonial officer who had brutally 'pacified' the area in the early 20th century. After independence the name was changed back to what it had always been. Formerly a center of trade, the town infrastructure has deteriorated significantly amid large-scale emigration, with the exception of a new hospital.
