= Manjak language =

Bak language spoken in West Africa

Manjak
- Manjáku
- Native to: Guinea-Bissau, Senegal, and the Gambia
- Ethnicity: Manjack
- Native speakers: 320,000 (2021–2022)
- Language family: Niger–Congo?: Atlantic–Congo; Senegambian; Bak; Manjaku–Papel; Manjak
- Dialects: Bok; Ulekes; Ucur; Ulund; Uyu; Unuab; Uteer; Uyool; Uyanga; Undin; Ubuey; Uguejan; Utimats; Uroongaan
- Writing system: Latin

Language codes
- ISO 639-3: mfv
- Glottolog: mand1419

Manjak or Manjack (French: Manjak, Manjaque; Portuguese: Manjaco) or Njak is a Bak language of Guinea-Bissau and Senegal. The language is also known as Kanyop.

In 2006, the total number of speakers was estimated at 315,300, including 184,000 in Guinea-Bissau, 105,000 in Senegal and 26,300 in The Gambia.

== Dialects ==
The Manjak dialects below are distinct enough that some might be considered separate languages.

- Bok (Babok, Sarar, Teixeira Pinto, Tsaam)
- Likes-Utsia (Baraa, Kalkus)
- Cur (Churo)
- Lund
- Yu (Pecixe, Siis, Pulhilh)
- Unhate (Binhante, Bissau)

The Manjak dialects listed by Wilson (2007) are

- Canchungo (kancuŋuʔ) – central dialect
- Baboque (babɔk) (formerly Teixeira Pinto) – eastern dialect
- Churo (cuur) – northern dialect
- Pecixe (locally called pəhlihl; otherwise pəsiis), on an island to the south
- Calequisse (kaləkiis), to the west of Canchungo

== Phonology ==
=== Consonants ===
| | | Labial | Alveolar | Post- alveolar | (Alveolo-) palatal | Velar |
|---|---|---|---|---|---|---|
| Nasal | | m | n | | ɲ | ŋ |
| Plosive/ Affricate | voiceless | p | t | t̠͡ɹ̠̊˔ | t͡ɕ | k |
| Plosive/ Affricate | voiced | b | d | | d͡ʑ | ɡ |
| Plosive/ Affricate | prenasal vl. | ᵐp | ⁿt | ⁿt̠͡ɹ̠̊˔ | ᶮt͡ɕ | ᵑk |
| Plosive/ Affricate | prenasal vd. | ᵐb | ⁿd | | ᶮd͡ʑ | ᵑɡ |
| Fricative | voiceless | f | s | | (ɕ) | |
| Fricative | voiced | | | | (ʑ) | |
| Lateral | | | l | | | |
| Approximant | | w | | | j | |

- Sounds [ɕ, ʑ] are heard in free-fluctuation with affricates /t͡ɕ, d͡ʑ/ in all positions except following nasals.
- Sounds /b, d, ɡ/ may also be lenited as [β, ɾ, ɣ] when in intervocalic or word-final positions. /d/ can also be heard as a trill [r] in free variation with [ɾ] when in word-final positions.

=== Vowels ===
| | Front | Central | Back |
|---|---|---|---|
| Close | i | | u |
| Close-mid | ɪ ~ e | ə | ʊ ~ o |
| Open-mid | ɛ | ɐ | ɔ |
| Open | | a | |

Only vowels /u/ and /a/ may also have lengthened equivalents; /uː/ and /aː/.

- Sounds /ɪ, ʊ/ may also range to more mid sounds [e, o] in free variation.
- /ɐ/ may have a central allophone as [ʌ̈].

Diphthongs
| | Front | Back |
|---|---|---|
| Close-mid | iə | uə |
| Open-mid | iɐ | uɐ |

- Sounds /iə, uə/ may have some fluctuation with lengthened sounds [eː, oː].

== Writing system ==
The official spelling system for Manjak established by the Senegalese government is regulated by Decree No. 2005-983 of 21 October 2005.

Manjak alphabet (Senegal)
| A | B | C | D | E | Ë | F | G | H | I | J | K | L | M | N | Ñ | Ŋ | O | P | R | S | Ŝ | T | [illegible] | U | W | Y | Z |
| a | b | c | d | e | ë | f | g | h | i | j | k | l | m | n | ñ | ŋ | o | p | r | s | ŝ | t | [illegible] | u | w | y | z |
