= Kasa language =

Jola language spoken in Senegal and Gambia

Kasa
- Jóola-Kaasa
- Native to: Senegal, Gambia
- Region: Oussouye
- Native speakers: 45,000 in Senegal (2007)
- Language family: Niger–Congo?: Atlantic–Congo; Bak; Jola; Kasa

Language codes
- ISO 639-3: csk
- Glottolog: jola1262

- Person: a-luf

Kasa, or Jóola-Kaasa (also Bacuki, Casa, etc.) is a Jola language of the Casamance region of Senegal and neighboring Gambia.

Dialects are Ayun, Bliss (Niomoun), Esulalu (Oussouye), Fluvial, Huluf, Selek.

In Oussouye (Husuy) dialect, a person is referred to as a-luf.
