= Balanta languages =

Bak language group of West Africa

Balanta
- Native to: (Balanta-Kentohe or Bissau-Guinean) Guinea-Bissau, (Balanta-Ganja) the Gambia, Senegal
- Ethnicity: 400,000 Balanta (2022)
- Native speakers: 460,000 (2021–2022)
- Language family: Niger–Congo?: Atlantic–Congo; Senegambian; Bak–Bijago; Bak proper; Balanta

Official status
- Official language in: Guinea-Bissau
- Recognised minority language in: Senegal

Language codes
- ISO 639-3: Either: ble – Balanta-Kentohe bjt – Balanta-Ganja
- Glottolog: bala1300

Balanta (or Bissau-Guinean, Balant or Bulanda) is a group of two closely related Bak languages of West Africa spoken by the Balanta people.

== Description ==
Balanta is now generally divided into two distinct languages: Balanta-Kentohe and Balanta-Ganja.

== Balanta-Kentohe ==
The Balanta-Kentohe (Kəntɔhɛ) language is spoken by about 423,000 people on the north central and central coast of Guinea-Bissau (where as of 2006 it is spoken by about 397,000 people, many of whom can be found in the Oio Region) as well as in the Gambia. Films and portions of the Bible have been produced in Balanta-Kentohe.

The Kəntɔhɛ dialect is spoken in the north, while the Fora dialect is spoken in the south.

Ethnologue lists the alternative names of Balanta-Kentohe as Alante, Balanda, Balant, Balanta, Balante, Ballante, Belante, Brassa, Bulanda, Frase, Fora, Kantohe (Kentohe, Queuthoe), Naga and Mane. The Naga, Mane and Kantohe dialects may be separate languages.

== Balanta-Ganja ==
Balanta-Ganja is spoken by 86,000 people (as of 2006) in the southwest corner of and the south of Senegal. Literacy is less than 1% for Balanta-Ganja. In September 2000, Balanta-Ganja was granted the status of a national language in Senegal, and as of then can now be taught in elementary school.

Ethnologue lists the alternative names of Balanta-Ganja as Alante, Balanda, Balant, Balante, Ballante, Belante, Brassa, Bulanda, Fjaa, Fraase (Fraasɛ). Its dialects are Fganja (Ganja) and Fjaalib (Blip).

== Grammar ==
Balanta has case prefixes and suffixes alternatively interpreted as a definite article dependent on the noun class.

== Phonology ==
The following are the phonemes of the Balanta dialects.

=== Consonants ===
Balanta consonants
		Labial	Dental	Alveolar	Palatal	Velar	Labial- velar	Glottal
Plosive	voiceless			t	c	k	kp	
Plosive	voiced	b		d	ɟ	ɡ	ɡb	
Plosive	prenasal vl.			ⁿt	ᶮc	ᵑk	ᵑkp	
Plosive	prenasal vd.	ᵐb		ⁿd	ᶮɟ	ᵑɡ	ᵑɡb	
Fricative	voiceless	f	θ	s				h
Fricative	prenasal	ᶬf	ⁿθ	ⁿs				
Nasal		m		n	ɲ	ŋ		
Rhotic				r				
Lateral				l				
Approximant					j		w	

Voiceless sounds [c k kp] are only heard in the Guinea Bissau dialect.

=== Vowels ===
Balanta vowels
	Front	Central	Back
High	i iː		u uː
High	ɪ ɪː		ʊ ʊː
Mid	e eː	ə	o oː
Mid	ɛ ɛː		ɔ ɔː
Low		a aː	

== Writing ==
In Senegal, Decree No. 2005-979 provides for an orthography of Balanta as follows:

Letters of the alphabet (Senegal)
A	B	Ɓ	D	E	F	G	H	I	J	L	M	N	Ñ	Ŋ	O	R	S	T	Ŧ	U	W	Y
a	b	ɓ	d	e	f	g	h	i	j	l	m	n	ñ	ŋ	o	r	s	t	ŧ	u	w	y
a	b		d	varies	f	ɡ	h	varies	ɟ	l	m	n	ɲ	ŋ	varies	r	s	t	θ	varies	w	j

The distinction between tense and non-tense vowels is indicated by the addition of an acute diacritic above tense vowels. Pre-nasalised consonants are indicated by preceding their consonant with a homorganic nasal (i.e. mp, nt, ñj). Unvoiced consonants are represented by doubling voiced consonants (i.e. bb = /p/)

== Relevant literature ==
- Creissels, Denis. 2016. A sketch of Ganja (Balant). In Friederike Lüpke (ed.), The Oxford guide to the Atlantic languages of West Africa. Oxford University Press.
- Mansaly, Jules. 2018. Dictionnaire des proverbes balant: Une langue du groupe atlantique-ouest de la famille niger-congo au Sénégal. (Series: Verbal Art and Documentary Literature in African Languages Volume 37.) Rüdiger Köppe Verlag.
- Migeod, F.W.H., The Languages of West Africa Volume II London 1913.
- Westermann, D. & Bryan, M.A. The Languages of West Africa. Published for the International African Institute by Dawsons of Pall Mall, Folkestone & London 1970.
