= Bak languages =

Atlantic language group of West Africa

Bak
- Bak–Bijago
- Geographic distribution: Senegal, Guinea-Bissau
- Linguistic classification: Niger–Congo?: Atlantic–Congo; Senegambian; Bak
- Subdivisions: Bak proper; Bijago

Language codes
- Glottolog: cent2230

The Bak languages are a group of typologically Atlantic languages of Senegal and Guinea-Bissau linked in 2010 to the erstwhile Atlantic isolate Bijago. Bak languages are non-tonal.

== Name ==
David Dalby coined the term Bak from the bVk- prefix found in the personal plural forms of demonstratives in the Bak languages. The -k- is not found in other Atlantic languages.

== Languages ==
- Bak languages
  - Bak proper
    - Balanta
      - Jola languages (Diola)
      - Papel languages (Manjaku)
  - Bijago

== Classification of Bijago ==
Bijago is highly divergent. Sapir (1971) classified it as an isolate within West Atlantic. However, Segerer (2010) showed that this is primarily due to unrecognized sound changes, and that Bijago is in fact close to the Bak languages. For example, the following cognates in Bijago and Joola Kasa (one of the Jola languages) are completely regular, but had not previously been identified:

Gloss	Bijago	Joola Kasa
head	bu	fu-kow
eye	nɛ	ji-cil

Segerer reconstructs the ancestral forms as *bu-gof and *di-gɛs, respectively, with the following developments:

- *bu-gof
  - > *bu-kof > *bu-kow > fu-kow
  - > *bu-ŋof > *bu-ŋo > (u-)bu
- *di-gɛs
  - > *di-kis > *di-kil > ji-cil
  - > *ne-ŋɛs > *ne-ŋɛ > nɛ

== Comparative vocabulary ==
Comparison of basic vocabulary words of the Bak languages:

Language	eye	ear	nose	tooth	tongue	mouth	blood	bone	tree	water	name; surname
Diola (Felup)	nyi-kil / ku-	ka-ɔs / o-	e-ŋindu / si-	ka-ŋin / o-	u-reeruɸ / ku-	bo-ʂom / o-	ha-sim	ka-gaka			
Diola (Husuy)	ji-kil	ka-noo (outer); ɛ-jan (inner)	ɛ-ŋendu	ka-ŋiin	ho-leluf	bu-tum	h-äsim	ɛ-wool	bu-nunukɛn / u-	mal	ka-jaw; ka-saaf / u-
Diola (Diembereng)	di-gin	ka-gɔndin; ɛ-jamo	ɛ-yinu	ka-ŋiin	kaa-leeluf	bu-tum	hallna		na-nukanuk / nyu-	mɔ-hujɔ	ho-roo
Karon	ni-kin	kaa-now	y-iinu	ka-ŋiin	hi-lɛɛluuf	pu-tum	hi-sim	kaa-cɛc			
Papel (Biombo)	p-kihl / k- / i-	k-warʂ	bu-ihl / i- 'nose'; b-ihl 'nostril'	p-nyiḭ	p-remtɛ́ / k- / i-	m-ntum	p-nyaak	p-mɔ(h)ɔ	b-oonoʔ / ŋ- / m-; bu-mul 'log'	m-nrʂup	k-tim / i-; p-nɔntʂa
Papel (Safim)	kiś		b-iś			m-tuɣum					
Manjaco (Baboque)	pə-kəs / k-	kä-batʂ	b-iis / g-	pə-roomaj / i-	pə-ndeämənt	m-tum	pə-nyak	ka-muä	b-kɔʔ / g- / m-ŋk	m-lek	ka-tim
Manjaco (Pecixe)	kəkähl / kə- / i-	ka-barʂ	bu-ahl / iihl 'nose'; b-iihl / ŋ- 'nostril'	pədoomiʔ	p-diämət	m-tum / ŋ- / i-	pə-nyaak	ka-mua			ka-tim
Manjaco (Churo)	pə-kəs	ka-bah	b-iis	p-roomɛɛʔ	p-reemint	n-tum	pə-nyaak	ka-muh	bo-mol / o-	n-nek	ka-tim 'land'
Mancanha	pə-kəʂ	ka-batʂ	b-yis	pə-nyḭ	pə-ndɛmənt	m-ntum	pə-nyaak	pə-mɔh	bə-jɛl / ŋ-	m-ɛl	ka-tim; ka-bɛp
Balanta (northern, Kəntɔhɛ)	f-kit / k-	kə-lɔʔ / k-	b-fuŋa / #-	f-sec / k-	kə-dɛmat / Ø-	b-sum / #-	k-saham	f-hool / k-	b-ta / Ø-	wɛdɛ	f-tookɛ; f-mbɛɛm
Bijago	n-ɛ̂ / ŋ-	kɔ-nnɔ / ŋa-	ŋɔ́-mɔ̀	ká-nyì / ŋá	nú-númɛ̀	ká-nà / ŋa-	nɛ-nyɛ	ka-ŋkpeene / ŋa-	ŋɔ-maŋgi / mɔ-	n-nyo; n-to 'brine'	ŋa-βin / N-
