= Casamance =

Coordinates: 13.0152°N 15.3176°W

Casamance Kasamansa (Wolof) 𞤑𞤢𞤧𞤢𞤥𞤢𞤲𞤧𞤢 (Fula) Casamança (Portuguese)
- Geographical region
- Casamance in Senegal
- Interactive map of Casamance
- Country: Senegal
- Largest city: Ziguinchor
- Parts: Kolda Region, Sédhiou Region and Ziguinchor Region

Area
  - Total: 28,464 km^{2} (10,990 sq mi)

Population (2024)
  - Total: 1,500,000
  - Density: 53/km^{2} (140/sq mi)

Casamance (Note: /ˈkæzəmæns, ˈkæsəmæns/ KAZ-ə-manss, KASS-ə-manss; French: [kɑzamɑ̃s]; Wolof: Kasamansa; Fula: 𞤑𞤢𞤧𞤢𞤥𞤢𞤲𞤧𞤢, romanized: Kasamansa; Portuguese: Casamansa or Casamança [kɐzɐˈmɐ̃sɐ].) is the area of Senegal south of the Gambia, including the Casamance River. It consists of the Lower Casamance (Basse Casamance, Baixa Casamança—i.e. Ziguinchor Region) and the Upper Casamance (Haute Casamance, Alta Casamança—i.e. Kolda and Sédhiou Regions). The largest city of Casamance is Ziguinchor.

== Etymology ==
The most widely accepted explanation is that Casamance derives from the Manding expression Kasa mansa, meaning “King of Kasa”. The name refers to the Kingdom of Kasa (sometimes called Kasanga), a historical state in the region. While many of the inhabitants of this kingdom were Bainuk and Jola it was ruled by a Mandinkized elite. The Portuguese, who maintained early trade relations with the area, rendered the title Kasa mansa as Casamansa. During the subsequent period of French colonial rule in Senegal, this Portuguese form was adapted into French as Casamance, which is the modern name of the region.

A less common interpretation suggests that the name may reflect a partial Lusophone origin, combining Portuguese casa (“house”) with Manding mansa (“king, chief”). This view, mentioned for example by Aloyse Kobès in his Wolof–French Dictionary (1923), has been considered more speculative.

== Peoples ==
Casamance is mainly inhabited by the Fulani, Jola and Bainuk. Significant minority populations include the Balanta and Mande. Casamance is religiously diverse, with the inhabitants practicing Islam, Christianity, and traditional African religions.

== History ==
According to local legends, the Jola and Bainuk people are said to have inhabited Casamance for over a thousand years. Jola leaders ruled portions of Casamance, frequently under the nominal rule of Wolof and Serer kingdoms to the north. From the 15th to 18th century, the Bainuk Kasa kingdom located in the Lower Casamance was the dominant state in the south. In the 15th century, Portuguese slave traders and navigators established a trading station in the area. They also formed trade relations with local Jola chiefs and the king of Kasa.

The Casamance was subject to both French and Portuguese colonial efforts before a border was negotiated in 1888 between the French colony of Senegal and Portuguese Guinea (now Guinea-Bissau) to the south. Portugal lost possession of Casamance, then the commercial hub of its colony. Casamance, to this day, has preserved the local variant of Upper Guinea Creole known as Casamance Creole, and the members of the deep-rooted Creole community carry Portuguese surnames like Da Silva, Carvalho and Fonseca. The historical ties to Portugal were a factor in Senegal's decision to seek membership of the Community of Portuguese Language Countries (CPLP), becoming an associate observer in 2008. Interest in Portuguese heritage has been revived in order to exert a distinct identity, particularly in Baixa Casamança.

Bissau-Guineans are also present in the region, as expatriates, immigrants, and refugees from the poverty and instability that since long affects the neighbouring country, including the 1998–1999 Guinea-Bissau Civil War.

=== Separatist movement ===
Flag used by several separatist organisations

Though the Jola are the dominant ethnic group in the Casamance, they represent only 4% of the total population of Senegal. The Jola's sense of economic disenfranchisement within greater Senegal contributed to the founding of a separatist movement advocating the independence or autonomous administrative division of the Casamance, the Movement of Democratic Forces of Casamance (MFDC), in 1982.

The MFDC's armed wing was established in 1985, and in 1990 the Casamance conflict began: a low-level insurgency led by the MFDC against the government of Senegal. The conflict has been characterized by sporadic violence and frequent but unstable ceasefire agreements. An illegal shipment of weapons hailing from Iran was seized in Lagos, Nigeria in October 2010, and the Senegalese government suspected the MFDC of having been the intended recipient of the weapons in The Gambia, which had cut ties with Iran the previous month. Senegal recalled its ambassador to Tehran over the incident.

== Geography and climate ==
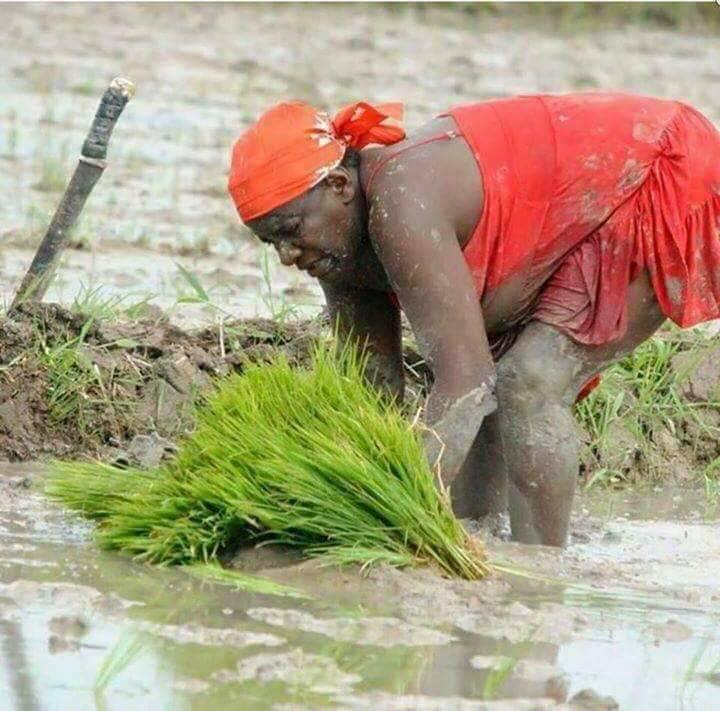
Woman working in a paddy field

The region is low-lying and hot, with some hills to the southeast. The entire Casamance region experiences a tropical savanna climate, with average rainfall greater than the rest of Senegal. The region is like the rest of Senegal: rainless from November to May, but during the rainy season from June to October, most areas receive over 1,270 millimetres (50 in), and the furthest southwest as much as 1,780 mm (70 in).

== Economy ==
The economy of the Casamance relies largely on rice farming and tourism, the latter of which benefits from extensive beaches along Casamance's coastline, particularly at Cap Skirring.

== Ecology ==
Tree cover in Casamance is severely threatened by illegal logging.
