= Casamance River =

Waterway in Senegal

Coordinates: 12.5561°N 16.7622°W

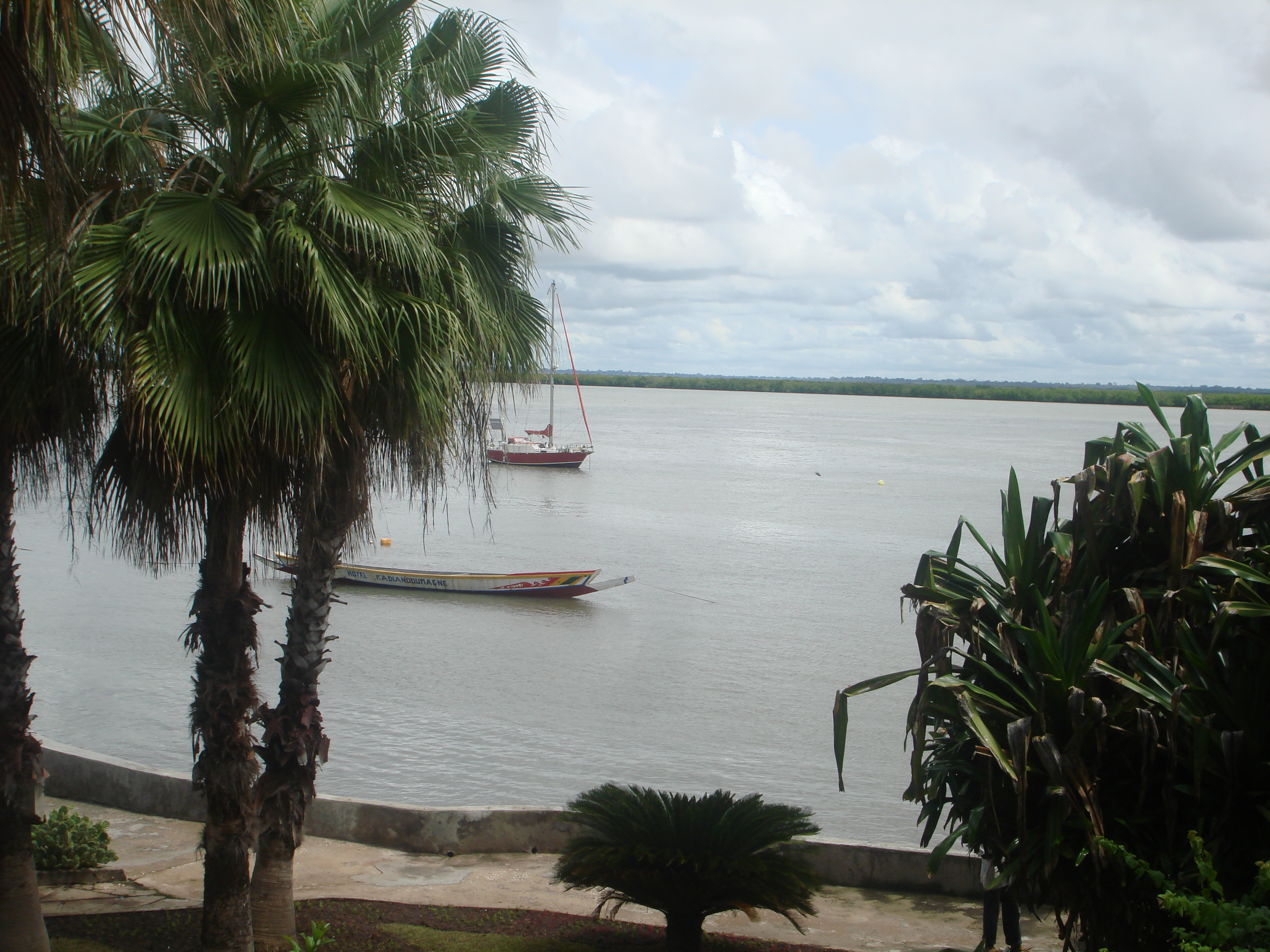
Casamance River at Ziguinchor

The Casamance River (French: Fleuve Casamance) in Senegal flows westward for the most part into the Atlantic Ocean along a path about 200 miles (320 km) in length. However, only 80 miles (130 km) are navigable. The Casamance is the principal river of the Kolda, Sédhiou, and Ziguinchor Regions in the southern portion of Senegal. It is located between the Gambia River to the north and the Cacheu and Geba rivers to the south.

There is a bridge at Ziguinchor, one of the most important towns on the river, that connects it to Bignona on the north bank. Other important settlements on its banks include Goudomp, Sedhiou, Diattakounda, Tanaff, and Kolda.

The river is named after the Kasa Mansa, or king of the precolonial Kasa kingdom.
