= African-American Muslims =

African-American religious minority

Total population
- 770,000–1,100,000 (est.)

Regions with significant populations
- United States

Languages
- English, Arabic, French, Portuguese, Swahili, Somali, Amharic, Tigrinya, Oromo, Hausa, Afar, Mandinka, Wolof, Serer, Susu, Fula, Kissi, Kpelle, Bambara, Mooré, Nouchi, Gourmanché, Guinea-Bissau Creole, Temne, Krio, Limba, Tuareg languages, Comorian languages and other African languages

Religion
- Predominantly: Sunni Islam, Sufi; Minority: Nation of Islam, Five-Percent Nation, Ahmadiyya, Moorish Science Temple of America, Shia

Related ethnic groups
- African American, African-American Jews, Muslim American, African Muslims, African Jews

African-American Muslims, also known as Black Muslims, are an African American religious minority. African American Muslims account for over 20% of American Muslims. They represent one of the larger Muslim populations of the United States as there is no ethnic group that makes up the majority of American Muslims. They mostly belong to the Sunni sect, but smaller Shia and Nation of Islam minorities also exist. The history of African-American Muslims is related to African-American history in general, and goes back to the Revolutionary and Antebellum eras. October is Muslim African American Heritage Month.

== History ==
Islam has historically been the biggest organized religion in the continent of Africa. Historically, an estimated 30% of black slaves brought to the United States from Western and Central Africa were Muslims. They were overwhelmingly literate in contrast to non-Muslim slaves, and thus were given supervisory roles. These captives were forced into Christianity during the era of American slavery; however, there are records of individuals such as Omar ibn Said practicing Islam for the rest of their lives in the United States. During the twentieth century, some African Americans converted to Islam, mainly through the influence of black nationalist groups that preached with distinctive Islamic practices including the Moorish Science Temple of America, founded in 1913, and the Nation of Islam, founded in the 1930s, which attracted at least 20,000 people by 1963. Prominent members included activist Malcolm X and boxer Muhammad Ali. Ahmadiyya Muslim groups also sought and won converts among African Americans in the 1920s and 1930s.

Malcolm X is considered the first person to start the movement among African Americans towards mainstream Islam, after he left the Nation and made the pilgrimage to Mecca. In 1975, Warith Deen Mohammed, the son of Elijah Muhammad took control of the Nation after his father's death and guided the majority of its members towards mainstream Sunni Islam. However, a few members rejected these changes, leading Louis Farrakhan to revive the Nation of Islam in 1978 based largely on the ideals of its founder, Wallace Fard Muhammad.

== Early American Muslims ==
=== Bilali Muhammad ===
Bilali Mohammed was an enslaved West African on a plantation on Sapelo Island, Georgia. Born in Timbo, Guinea between 1760 and 1779 to a well-educated African Muslim family. Renowned for his literacy, knowledge of Islam, and higher education than his slaveowners, Bilali was the leader and imam of a community of enslaved people, where he lived with his multiple wives and many children. He is best known for his handwritten, Arabic manuscript on West African fiqh (Islamic jurisprudence). The 19th century manuscript detailed Islamic beliefs and the rules for ablution, morning prayer, and the calls to prayer. In the 1940s it was taken to Nigeria to be translated by Hausa scholars. Today the manuscript has become one of the most sacred Islamic documents to African American Muslims. Bilali has many living descendants.

=== Omar Ibn Said ===
Omar Ibn Said was a Muslim scholar from Futa Toro (present-day Senegal) who was enslaved and transported to the United States in 1807. Born to a wealthy family in what would in a few years become the Imamate of Futa Toro, an Islamic theocratic state located along the Middle Senegal River in West Africa. Literate in Arabic, he is most known for his 14 Arabic manuscripts about his life and his theology. "Omar ibn Said was described as a 'staunch Mohammedan, and the first year at least kept the fast of Rhamadan with all great strictness.'”

Omar Ibn Said is one of the most celebrated figures in African American history and his works have become world famous. His autobiography is housed at The Library of Congress in Washington D.C.

Masjid Omar ibn Sayyid was opened in Fayetteville, North Carolina in 1991 to honor his legacy.

=== Yarrow Mamout ===
Yarrow Mamout was a formerly enslaved entrepreneur and property owner in Georgetown, Washington, D.C. Born in West Africa, he was kidnapped, enslaved, and taken to Annapolis, Maryland. He was educated and literate in Arabic because of his Islamic background. After being freed at the age of 60, he became a property owner and prominent investor. Mamout was known for praying and praising Allah in public and wearing traditional African Muslim clothing.

Mamout's son Aquilla purchased land in Washington County, Maryland and moved there with his wife, Mary Turner. The town of Yarrowsburg, Maryland, was named after her. Her great-grandnephew, Robert Turner Ford, graduated from Harvard University in 1927.

In 2023, Georgetown dedicated the Masjid Yarrow Mamout in honor of Mamout.

== Demographics ==
African-American Muslims constitute 20% of the total U.S. Muslim population. Despite this, 2% of Black Americans are Muslim (most adhere to various sects of Christianity, particularly Protestantism).

The majority are Sunni Muslims; a substantial proportion of these identify under the community of W. Deen Mohammed. Cities with large concentration of African-American Muslims include Chicago, Detroit, New York City, Newark, Washington. D.C., Philadelphia, and Atlanta. The Nation of Islam led by Louis Farrakhan has a membership ranging from 20,000 to 50,000 members.

== Sects ==
During the first half of the 20th century, a small number of African Americans established groups based on Islamic and Gnostic teachings. The first of these groups was the Moorish Science Temple of America, founded by Timothy Drew (Drew Ali) in 1913. Drew taught that black people were of Moorish origin but their Muslim identity was taken away through slavery and racial segregation, advocating the return to Islam of their Moorish ancestry.

=== Sunni Islam ===
Sunni is a term derived from sunnah (سُنَّة /ˈsunna/, plural سُنَن sunan /ˈsunan/) meaning "habit", "usual practice", "custom", "tradition". The Muslims use this term to refer to the sayings and living habits of Muhammad. Its adherents are referred to in Arabic as ahl as-sunnah wa l-jamāʻah ("the people of the sunnah and the community") or ahl as-sunnah for short. In English, its adherents are known as Sunni Muslims, Sunnis, Sunnites and Ahlus Sunnah. Sunni Islam is sometimes referred to as "orthodox Islam". The Quran, together with hadith (especially those collected in Kutub al-Sittah) and binding juristic consensus form the basis of all traditional jurisprudence within Sunni Islam. Sharia rulings are derived from these basic sources, in conjunction with analogical reasoning, consideration of public welfare and juristic discretion, using the principles of jurisprudence developed by the traditional legal schools.

The conversion of Malik el-Shabazz (better known as Malcolm X) in 1964 is widely regarded as the turning point for the spread of orthodox Sunni Islam among Black American Muslims. Encouraged to learn about Sunni Islam after his departure from the Nation of Islam, he converted; others from the Nation of Islam soon followed. Warith Deen Mohammed rose to leadership of the Nation of Islam in 1975 following the death of his father Elijah Muhammad and began the groundbreaking, though sometimes controversial, process of leading Black Muslims out of the NOI and into Sunni Islam. As a result of his personal thinking and studies of the Quran, he became part of Ahlus Sunnah during a term in federal prison from 1961 to 1963 for refusing induction into the United States military.

Mohammed introduced many reforms and began an information campaign about Sunni Islam much as el-Shabazz had years earlier. He stated that Fard was not divine and that his father was not a prophet. All of the over 400 temples were converted into traditional Islamic mosques, and he introduced the Five Pillars of Islam to his followers. He rejected literal interpretations of his father's theology and Black-separatist views and on the basis of his intensive independent study of Islamic law, history, and theology, he accepted whites as fellow worshipers. However, he also encouraged African Americans to separate themselves from their pasts, in 1976 calling upon them to change their surnames which were often given to their ancestors by slave masters. He forged closer ties with mainstream Muslim communities, including Hispanic and Latino American Muslims. By 1978 he had succeeded in leading the majority of the original NOI to Sunni Islam which still stands as the largest mass conversion to Islam in the United States. In many urban areas of the United States today many Black Muslims in the Sunni tradition are known and recognized by the hijabs on women and kufi caps and long beards for men. These beards are grown as an adherence to the Sunnah of Muhammad for men to let their beards grow. Commonly called Sunnah beards, and Sunni Beards, among Muslims and more recently known as Philly beards have also gained popularity among non-Muslim men emulating the Muslim style.

=== Shia Islam ===
During the Muslim movement in the United States during the 20th century, the African American community was also introduced to Shia Islam. The majority of African Americans at that time were not aware of the Sunni-Shia divide, although most became Sunni due to how it was more widespread, a lack of access to Shia learning materials, and the stigma associated with Shia Islam. The 1979 Iranian Revolution gave Shia Muslims a voice within the Muslim community. This was the time when African Americans were first exposed to Shia Islam, and by 1982, more than one thousand African Americans had accepted Shia Islam in Philadelphia alone. Many Salafi and Wahhabi preachers were unhappy about the growth of Shia Islam, and began telling African American Muslims that it was disbelief, which alienated African American Shias from their community. African American Sunnis, encouraged by Sunni extremist missionaries, often attacked African American Shias in prisons.

A popular African American Shia preacher is Amir Hakeem, who joined the Nation of Islam in prison and later converted to Shia Islam before being released. Hakeem became an assistant at a mosque in Watts and hosts charity work as well as teaches gang members in Los Angeles about Shia Islam. He stated that the Shia community of Watts is predominantly African Americans.

Malcolm Shabazz, the grandson of Malcolm X, also converted to Shia Islam and had died as a Shia Muslim.

=== Moorish Science Temple of America ===
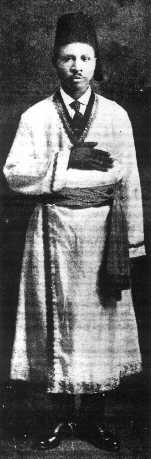
Noble Drew Ali of the Moorish Science Temple of America

The Moorish Science Temple of America (MSTA) is an American organization founded in 1913 by self-proclaimed prophet Noble Drew Ali. Born in 1886 in North Carolina, Ali claimed to be returning African-Americans to the creed and principles of their ancestral religion, Islam. The tradition is not, however, historically connected to mainstream Islam; instead, it emerged independently in the United States with inspiration from the Muslim tradition. Ali's teachings aligned with Sufi ideas regarding the higher self and the lower self; they also drew heavily from elements of Buddhism, Christianity, Gnosticism, and Taoism. The MSTA can be distinguished from mainstream Islam by its strongly African-American demography, by its emphasis on Iman, or creed, as opposed to mainstream Islam's Five Pillars, by its significant divergences from mainstream Islamic moral and ritual practice, and by its association with black nationalism. These distinctives make its classification as an Islamic denomination a matter of debate among both Muslims and scholars of religion.

Another significant element of the MSTA's teaching is that African-Americans are actually "descendants of the ancient Moabites whom [sic] inhabited the North Western and South Western shores of Africa." Specifically, they hold that the Moabites' Iberian Moorish descendants, recently defeated by European powers in the Spanish Reconquista, were prevalent among the victims of the Atlantic slave trade, making them ancestors of modern African Americans. MSTA adherents also believe that the Negroid Asiatic was the first human inhabitant of the Western Hemisphere. While these assertions about African American origins, Moorish history, and American history are not consistent with the conclusions of historical research, adherants refer to themselves as "Asiatics" in their religious texts and call themselves "indigenous Moors", "American Moors" or "Moorish Americans" rather than, or in contradistinction to "African Moors" or "African Americans."

=== Nation of Islam ===
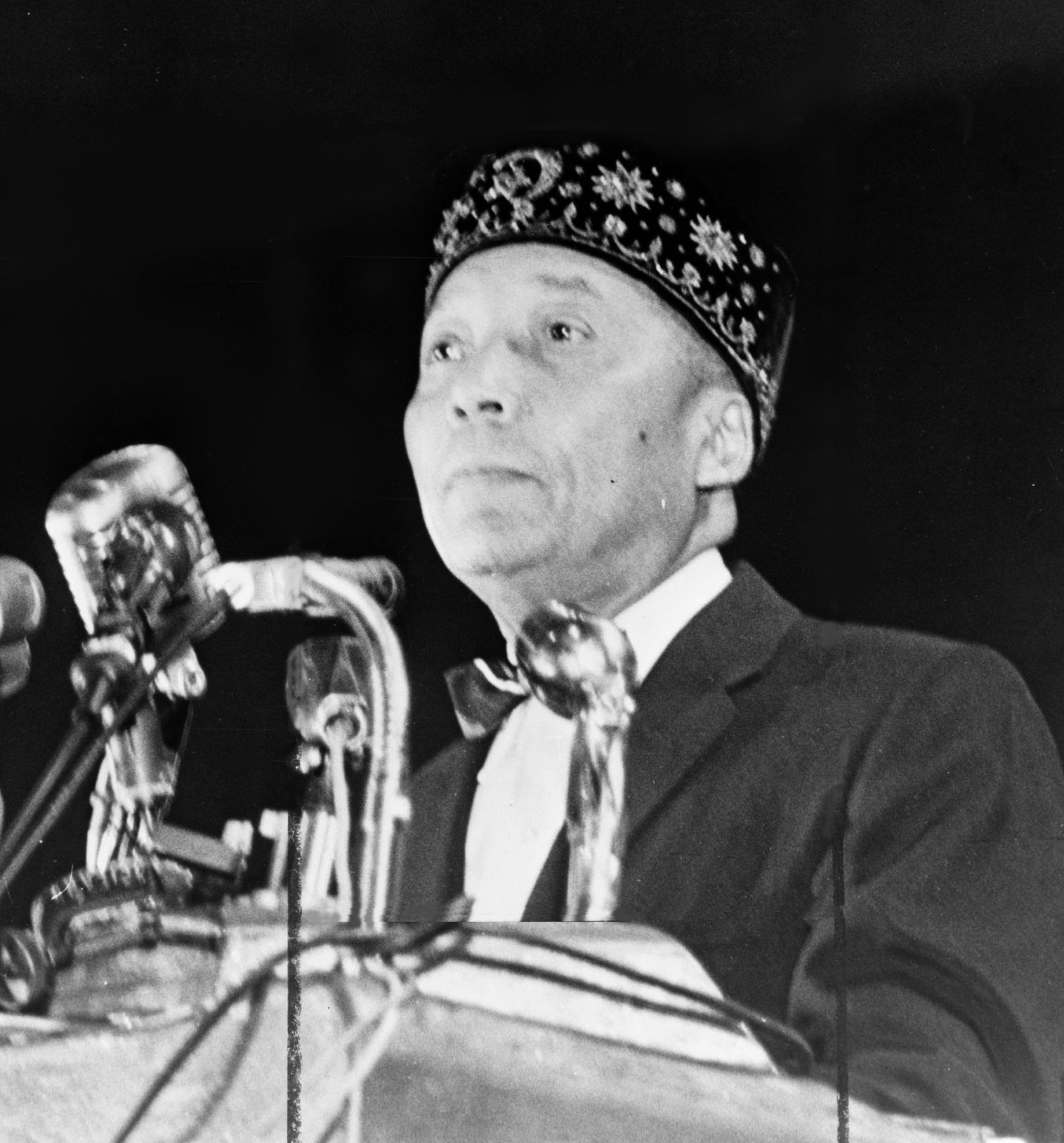
Elijah Muhammad, the leader of the Nation of Islam from 1933–1975

The Nation of Islam (NOI) was created in 1930 by Wallace Fard Muhammad. Fard drew inspiration for NOI doctrines from those of Timothy Drew's Moorish Science Temple of America. He provided three main principles which serve as the foundation of the NOI: "Allah is God, the white man is the devil and the so-called Negroes are the Asiatic Black People, the cream of the planet earth".

In 1934, Elijah Muhammad became the leader of the NOI. He deified Fard, saying that he was an incarnation of God, and taught that he was a prophet who had been taught directly by God in the form of Fard. Two of the most famous people to join the NOI were Malcolm X, who became the face of the NOI in the media, and Muhammad Ali, who, while initially rejected, was accepted into the group shortly after his first world heavyweight championship victory. Both Malcolm X and Ali later became Sunni Muslims.

Malcolm X was one of the most influential leaders of the NOI and, in accordance with NOI doctrine, advocated the complete separation of blacks from whites. He left the NOI after being silenced for 90 days (due to a controversial comment on the John F. Kennedy assassination), and proceeded to form Muslim Mosque, Inc. and the Organization of Afro-American Unity before his pilgrimage to Mecca and conversion to Sunni Islam. He is viewed as the first person to start the movement among African Americans towards Sunni Islam.

Muhammad died in 1975 and his son, Warith Deen Mohammed, became the leader of the Nation of Islam. He led the organization toward Sunni Islam and renamed it the World Community of Islam in the West the following year. Louis Farrakhan, who quit Warith Deen Mohammed's group, started an organization along the lines of Elijah Muhammad's teachings. Farrakhan renamed his organization the Nation of Islam in 1981 and has regained many properties associated with Elijah Muhammad, such as Mosque Maryam, its Chicago headquarters.

It was estimated that the Nation of Islam had at least 20,000 members in 2006. However, today the group has a wide influence in the African American community. The first Million Man March took place in Washington, D.C. in 1995 and was followed later by another one in 2000 which was smaller in size but more inclusive, welcoming individuals other than just African American men. The group sponsors cultural and academic education, economic independence, and personal and social responsibility.

The Nation of Islam has received a great deal of criticism for its anti-white, anti-Christian, and anti-semitic teachings, and is listed as a hate group by the Southern Poverty Law Center. Muslim critics accuse the NOI of promoting teachings that are not authentically Islamic.

==== Conversion to orthodox Sunni Islam ====
After the death of Elijah Muhammad, he was succeeded by his son, Warith Deen Mohammed. Mohammed rejected many teachings of his father, such as the divinity of Fard Muhammad, and saw a white person as also a worshiper. As he took control of the organization, he quickly brought in new reforms. He renamed it the World Community of al-Islam in the West; later it became the American Society of Muslims. It was estimated that there were 200,000 followers of W. D. Mohammed at the time.

W. D. Mohammed introduced teachings that were based on orthodox Sunni Islam. He removed the chairs in the organization's temples, and replaced the entire "temple" concept with the traditional Muslim house of worship, the mosque, also teaching how to pray the salat, to observe the fasting of Ramadan, and to attend the pilgrimage to Mecca.

A small number of Black Muslims however rejected these new reforms brought by Imam Mohammed. Louis Farrakhan who broke away from the organization, re-established the Nation of Islam under the original Fardian doctrines, and remains its leader.

=== Five-Percent Nation ===
The Five-Percent Nation, sometimes referred to the "Nation of Gods and Earths" (NGE/NOGE) or the "Five Percenters", is an American organization founded in 1964 in the Harlem section of the borough of Manhattan, New York City, by a former member of the Nation of Islam named Clarence 13X (born Clarence Edward Smith and later known as "Allah the Father"). Clarence 13X, a former student of Malcolm X, left the Nation of Islam after a theological dispute with the Nation's leaders over the nature and identity of God. Specifically, Clarence 13X denied that the Nation's biracial founder Wallace Fard Muhammad was Allah and instead taught that the black man was himself God personified.

Members of the group call themselves Allah's Five Percenters, which reflects the concept that ten percent of the people in the world know the truth of existence, and those elites and agents opt to keep eighty-five percent of the world in ignorance and under their controlling thumb; the remaining five percent are those who know the truth and are determined to enlighten the rest.

=== United Nation of Islam ===
The United Nation of Islam (UNOI) is a group based in Kansas City, Kansas. It was founded in 1978 by Royall Jenkins, who continues to be the leader of the group and styles himself "Royall, Allah in Person".

=== Ahmadiyya ===
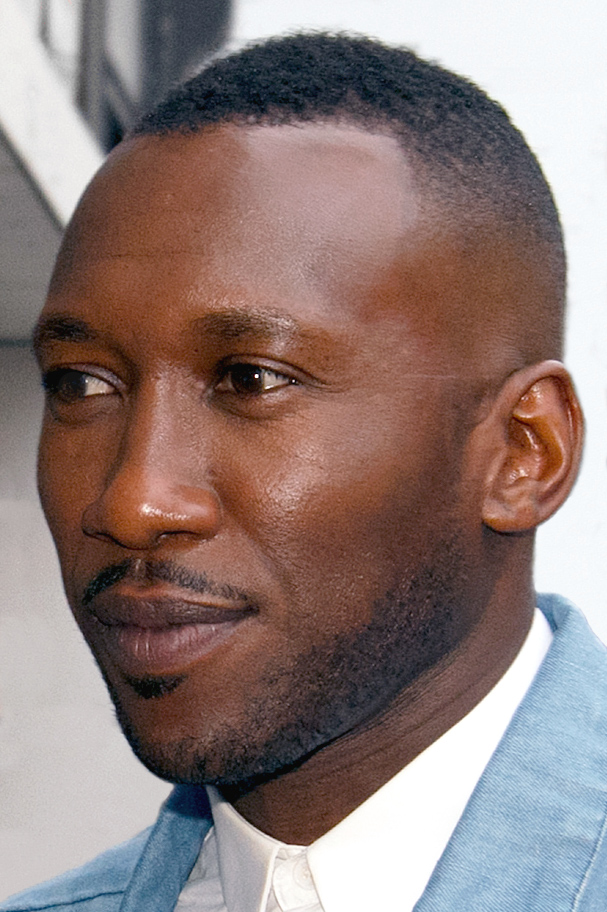
Mahershala Ali is an Ahmadi Muslim

Although at first the Ahmadiyya Muslim Community's efforts were broadly spread out over a large number of racial and ethnic groups, subsequent realization of the deep-seated racial tensions and discrimination in the US made Ahmadi missionaries focus their attention mainly on African Americans and the Muslim immigrant community. Ahmadis often became vocal proponents of the Civil Rights Movement. In recent times, many Ahmadi Muslims fled countries like Pakistan as refugees due to persecution; this has brought a small second wave of Ahmadis to the United States.

== Mosques ==
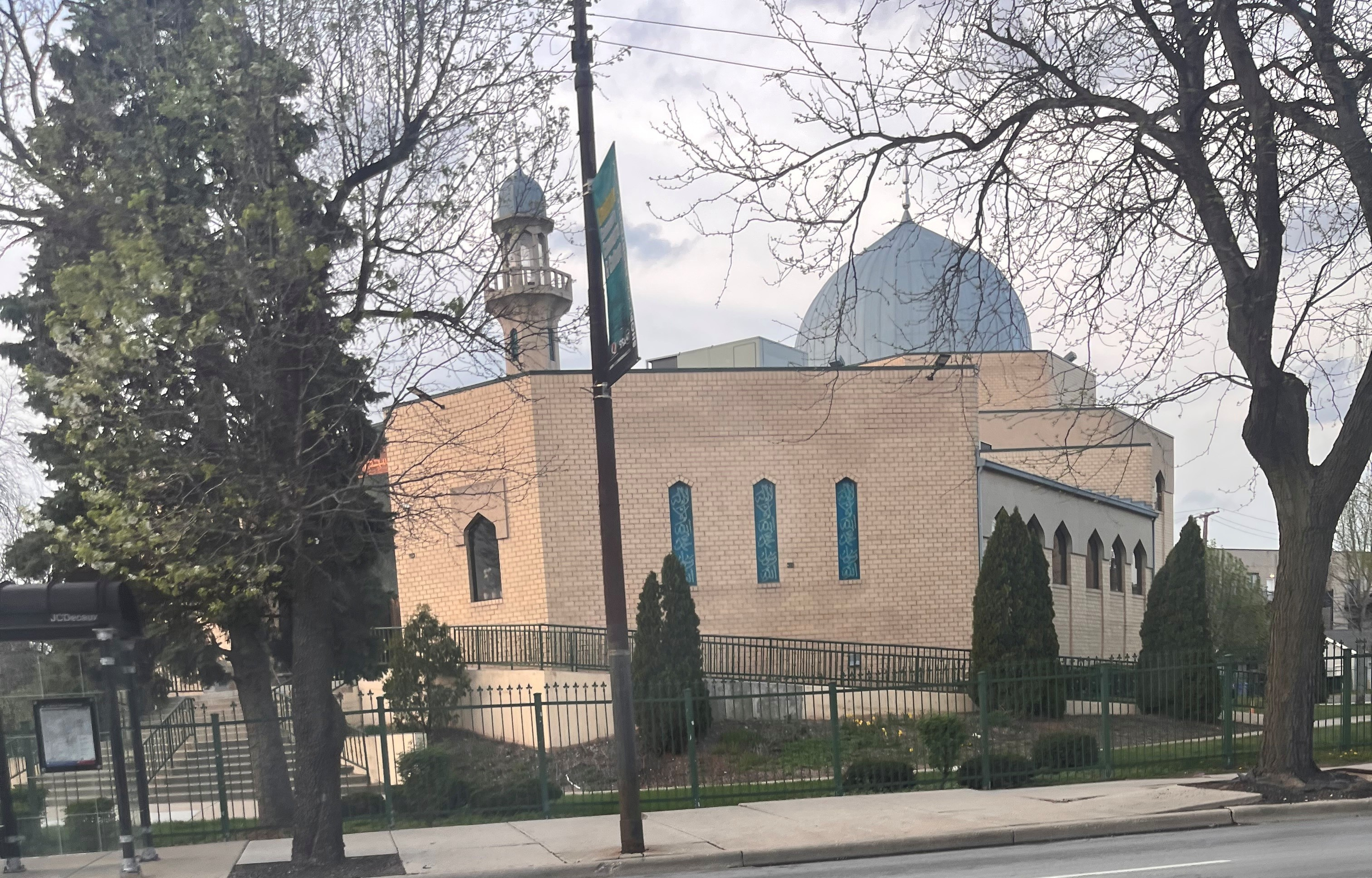
Masjid al Fatir in Chicago,IL

Mosque attendance in urban areas of the United States is often stratified ethnically. In Chicago, Masjid al-Faatir, the first free-standing mosque built in Chicago (in 1983) was built on land donated by Muhammad Ali. "Masjid al-Faatir has two octagonal sections joined together, one larger than the other, and has two free-standing minarets and a large central dome. The mosque can accommodate up to three thousand worshipers at one time." It served as a vibrant hub for African American Muslims for decades.

== Prison conversions to Islam ==
Conversion to Islam is a practice which is common to African-Americans in prison. J. Michael Waller found that Muslim inmates comprise 17–20% of the prison population, or roughly 350,000 inmates in 2003. Waller states that these inmates mostly come into prison as non-Muslims. According to him, 80% of the prisoners who "find faith" while in prison convert to Islam. These converted inmates are mostly African American, with a small but growing Hispanic minority. Waller also asserts that many converts are radicalized by outside Islamist groups linked to terrorism, but other experts suggest that when radicalization does occur it has little to no connection with these outside interests.

== Notable African-American Muslims ==
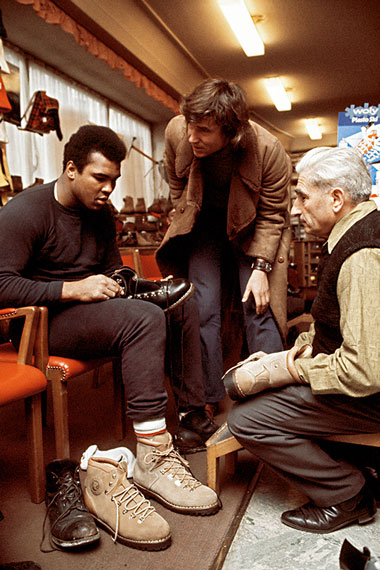
Muhammad Ali in 1971

=== Pre-20th century ===
- Abdul Rahman Ibrahima Sori, a prince from modern-day Guinea, captured and sold as a slave in the United States, freed with government intervention 40 years later, and returned and died in Liberia
- Omar ibn Said, a Fula scholar from Futa Toro in West Africa (present-day Senegal), who was enslaved, transported to the United States in 1807, and wrote a series of Arabic-language works on history and theology
- Yarrow Mamout, a formerly enslaved Fula entrepreneur and property owner in Georgetown, Washington, D.C.
- Ayuba Suleiman Diallo, a prominent Fulani prince and author from modern-day Senegal who was kidnapped and trafficked to the Americas during the Atlantic slave trade, having previously owned and sold slaves himself

=== Activists ===
- Malcolm X, civil rights leader
- Louis Farrakhan, religious leader

=== Intellectuals ===
- Aminah B. McCloud Al-Deen, professor emerita of Islamic Studies in the Department of Religious Studies at DePaul University
- Sherman (Abdul Hakim) Jackson, King Faisal Chair of Islamic Thought and Culture and Professor of Religion and American Studies and Ethnicity at the University of Southern California
- Rasul Miller, assistant Professor in History, University of California Irvine
- Jamillah Karim, author and former Professor of Religion at Spelman College

=== Politicians ===
- Ako Abdul-Samad, member of the Iowa House of Representatives (2007–present)
- Charles Bilal, former mayor of Kountze, Texas
- André Carson, U.S. Representative for Indiana's 7th congressional district (2008–present)
- Keith Ellison, Attorney General of Minnesota and former U.S. Representative for Minnesota's 5th congressional district (2007–2019)
- Jamilah Nasheed, member of the Missouri Senate (2013–present)
- John Collins-Muhammad, City of St. Louis Alderman of the 21st District
- Larry Shaw, former member of the North Carolina Senate (1995–2009)
- Ilhan Omar, U.S. Representative for Minnesota's 5th congressional district (2019–present)
- Lateefah Simon, U.S. Representative for California's 12th congressional district (2025–present)
- Omar Fateh, member of the Minnesota Senate (2021–present)

=== Athletes ===
- Kareem Abdul-Jabbar, former basketball player
- Ahmad Rashad, former NFL player
- Mahmoud Abdul-Rauf, former basketball player
- Shareef Abdur-Rahim, former basketball player
- Muhammad Ali, former professional boxer
- Rubin Carter, former professional boxer
- Shaquille O'Neal, former basketball player
- Ibtihaj Muhammad, Olympian Professional Fencer
- Mike Tyson, former professional boxer
- Gervonta Davis, professional boxer
- Husain Abdullah, former professional NFL player
- Rasheed Wallace, former basketball player
- Jamaal Wilkes, former basketball player
- Kyrie Irving, professional basketball player
- Jaylen Brown, professional basketball player
- Ameer Abdullah, professional football player
- Dominique Easley, professional football player
- Muhammad Wilkerson, professional football player
- Mohammed Sanu, professional football player
- Hamza Abdullah, former professional football player
- Husain Abdullah, former professional football player
- Az-Zahir Hakim, former professional football player and coach
- Ryan Harris, former professional football player
- Abdul Hodge, former professional football player
- Ephraim Salaam, former professional football player
- Sharrieff Shah, football coach
- Yunus Musah, professional soccer player
- Devin Haney , professional boxer
- Azeez Al-Shaair, professional football player

=== Musicians ===
- Ali Shaheed Muhammad, DJ and producer
- Ahmad Jamal, jazz pianist
- Akon, singer
- AR-Ab, rapper
- Art Blakey, jazz drummer
- Bas, rapper
- Beanie Sigel, rapper
- B.G. Knocc Out, rapper
- Buckshot, rapper
- Busta Rhymes, rapper
- Dave East, rapper
- Divine Styler, rapper
- E.D.I. Mean, rapper
- Freddie Gibbs, rapper
- Freeway, rapper
- Ghostface Killah, rapper
- Ice Cube, rapper and actor
- Idris Muhammad, musician
- Idrees Sulieman, jazz trumpeter
- Jay Electronica, rapper
- Jermaine Jackson, singer-songwriter
- Joe Tex, singer and musician
- Kevin Gates, rapper
- King Von, rapper
- Lil Durk, rapper
- Lupe Fiasco, rapper
- MC Ren, rapper
- MF Doom, rapper
- Moneybagg Yo, rapper
- Mos Def, rapper
- Napoleon, rapper
- Nas, rapper
- Olu dara, jazz musician
- PnB Rock, rapper
- Q-Tip, rapper
- Pop Smoke, rapper
- Raekwon, rapper
- Rhymefest, rapper
- Robert "Kool" Bell, musician
- Sahib Shihab, jazz musician
- Sean Price, rapper
- Sheck Wes, rapper
- Shy Glizzy, rapper
- Swizz Beatz, producer
- SZA, singer and songwriter
- The Jacka, rapper
- T-Pain, singer
- Ty Dolla Sign, rapper
- Westside Gunn, rapper
- Yusuf Lateef, musician
- Quando Rondo, rapper

=== Entertainment ===
- Iman, fashion model and actress
- Dave Chappelle, comedian
- Giancarlo Esposito, actor
- Mahershala Ali, actor
- Halima Aden, fashion model
- Barkhad Abdi, actor
- Yahya Abdul-Mateen II, actor
- Felonious Munk, comedian

=== Religion ===
- Siraj Wahhaj
- Warith Deen Muhammad
- Khalid Abdul Muhammad
- Mikaeel Ahmed Smith, a convert to Islam who studied Islam in the US and later at Jami’a Abu Noor in Damascus, Syria. He is a faculty member at Qalam Seminary and is the author of two books, With the Heart in Mind and When Hearing Becomes Listening.
- Ubaydullah Evans, religious scholar, converted to Islam in high school and later became the first African American to graduate from the Sharia program at al-Azhar University in Cairo, Egypt.

=== Other ===
- Yusuf Bey, entrepreneur
- Larry Hoover, former gang leader
- Jeff Fort, former gang leader
- Abdur Rahman Toure' Muhammad, founder of Deentown USA & Muslim African American Heritage Month (October)

== See also ==
- American Society of Muslims
- Nation of Islam
- Moorish Science Temple of America
- United Nation of Islam
- Five-Percent Nation
- Nuwaubian Nation
- Islam in the African diaspora

General

- Religion in Black America
- Islam in Africa
- Islam and hip hop in the United States
