= Kenneth L. Hale Award =

Award by the Linguistic Society of America

The Kenneth L. Hale Award, named after the American linguist and polyglot Kenneth L. Hale, is an award given to a member of the Linguistic Society of America in order to recognize "scholars who have done outstanding work on the documentation of a particular language or family of languages that is endangered or no longer spoken." It has been described as one "response to the urgency of recording endangered languages before they disappear." The award was not given out in 2024 nor 2025.

== Recipients ==
- Kathleen Bragdon (2002): Massachusett
- Ives Goddard (2002): Massachusett
- Robert W. Young (2006): Navajo
- Nicholas Evans (2011): Aboriginal languages: Mayali, Kunwinjku and Kune, Kayardild, Dalabon
- Nancy Dorian (2012): Scots Gaelic
- Claire Bowern (2014): Bardi
- Anvita Abbi (2015): Great Andamanese
- Melissa Axelrod (2017): Koyukon, Dene, Tanoan, and Ixil
- Nora England (2016): Mam and Mayan
- Tucker Childs (2018): Bolom group, Kisi, Bom, Mani, Kim, and Sherbro
- Judith Aissen (2019): Mayan languages
- Patience Epps (2020): Naduhup languages
- Sharon Hargus (2021): Athabaskan languages of Alaska and the Pacific Northwest and Yakima Sahaptin language
- Felicity Meakins (2022): Ngumpin–Yapa languages
- Andrew Garrett (2023): Yurok and Karuk language
- Jeffrey Heath (2026): Australian Aboriginal languages, Berber, Basque, varieties of Arabic, Songhay, Dogon languages, and Mande languages

== See also ==
- Victoria A. Fromkin Lifetime Service Award
