= Languages of Sierra Leone =

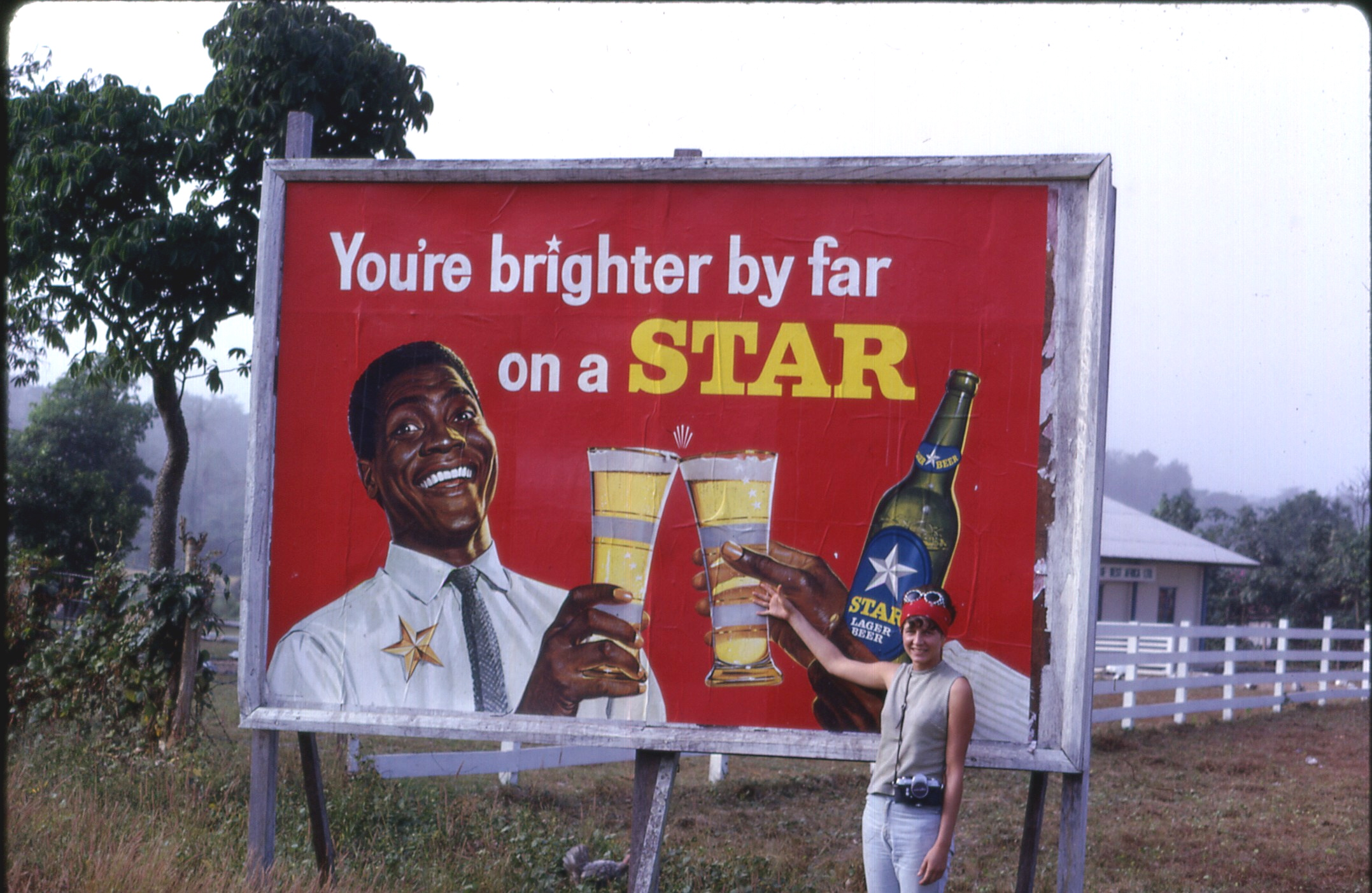
- Advertisement in English, Pendembu
- Official: English
- Recognised: Krio, Mende, Temne
- Minority: Fula, Klao, Kissi, Kono, Kuranko, Limba, Loko, Maninka, Pular, Sherbro, Sua, Susu, Yalunka
- Signed: Sierra Leonean Sign Language
- Keyboard layout: QWERTY

Ethnolinguistic map of Sierra Leone

Sierra Leone is a multilingual country. English is the official language, and Krio is the most widely spoken language among the different ethnic groups across Sierra Leone.

The country was named by 15th-century Portuguese explorer Pedro de Sintra, the first European to sight and map Freetown harbor. The original Portuguese name, Serra Lyoa (“Lion Mountains”), referred to the range of hills that surrounds the harbor. The capital, Freetown, commands one of the world's largest natural harbors. Sierra Leone attained independence on April 27, 1961, and transitioned to a republic on April 19, 1971. Since gaining independence, the country has experienced numerous changes in its socio-political and economic spheres.

Other major languages include Mende, which is spoken by 31% of the population as a mother tongue and is also widely spoken in the southern, and most of the Eastern part of Sierra Leone. Temne, which is spoken by 32% as a mother tongue, is also widely spoken in the northern province and the north Western province. Other languages include Kono, Kissi, Kuranko, Limba, Fula (Pular), Mandingo and Susu.

Although English, as the official language, is spoken in schools, government administration and the media, Krio is spoken as a lingua franca in virtually all parts of Sierra Leone. Krio, an English-based creole language, is the mother tongue of 10.5% of the population but is spoken by 90% of Sierra Leoneans.

Smaller groups encompass the coastal Bullom, Vai, and Krim, as well as the Fulani and Malinke, who are immigrants from Guinea concentrated in the north and east. The Creoles, descendants of liberated blacks who settled the coast from the late 18th to the mid-19th century, are primarily found in and around Freetown. Throughout the 19th century, blacks from the United States and West Indies also settled in Sierra Leone. The ethnic diversity is further enhanced by the presence of Lebanese and Indian traders in urban centers. Mende, spoken by 31% of the population as a native language, is widely used in the southern and most of the eastern parts of Sierra Leone. Temne, spoken by 32% as a mother tongue, is also widely spoken in the northern and northwestern provinces.
