= Bullom So language =

Mel language of Sierra Leone and Guinea

Bullom So
- Native to: Sierra Leone, Guinea
- Region: coast of Guinea, near the Sierra Leone border
- Native speakers: 7,700 in Sierra Leone (2019); Few in Guinea
- Language family: Niger–Congo?: Atlantic–Congo; Mel; Bullom–Kissi; Bullom; Northern; Bullom So

Language codes
- ISO 639-3: buy
- Glottolog: bull1247
- ELP: Mani

The Bullom So language, also called Mmani, Mani, or Mandingi, is an endangered language currently spoken in a few villages in Samu region of Sierra Leone's Kambia District, near the border of Guinea. It belongs to the Mel branch of the Niger–Congo language family and is particularly closely related to the Bom language. Intermarriage between Bullom So speakers and speakers of Temne and Susu is common. As the few remaining speakers of Bullom So are all over 60, the language is considered moribund.

== History ==
According to Childs, the Mani once occupied an area far greater than where the language is spoken today. At the start of the 18th century, the Mani kingdom stretched from Sierra-Leone to Guinea. They were later replaced along the coastal region by Temne-Baga speakers, and later by the Soso, through war, invasion and acculturation.

== Classification ==
The Bullom So (Mani) language is a Niger-Congo language of Mel subgroup. It is closely related to Kisi, Sherbro, Kim and Bom.

== Phonology ==
Consonants of Bullom So
		Labial	Dental	Palatal	Velar	Labial– velar	Glottal
Nasal		m		ɲ ⟨ny⟩	ŋ		
Plosive	plain	p b	t d	tʃ ⟨c⟩	k	gb	
Plosive	prenasalized	ᵐp	ⁿt ⁿd		ᵑk		
Fricative		f	s				h
Liquid			r l				
Semivowel				j ⟨y⟩		w	

=== Prosody ===
The most common syllable type in Bullom So (Mani) is CV and CVC. Nasals can also be syllabic, though they are relatively uncommon, much like V only syllables.

Vowels are nasalised when syllable codas contain nasals. Here are some examples from Childs (2011: 37):

Regressive Nasal Assimilation

- /wàm/ [wãm] or [wã] 'ten'
- /tún/ [tũ] 'commit'
- /bìn/ [bĩ] 'plank'
- /nyɛ̀n/ [nyɛ̃] 'mouth'

== Orthography ==
=== Before the 21st century ===
Gustavus Reinhold Nyländer translated the Gospel of Matthew into Bullom So, and portions of the Bible were also included in his Book of Common Prayer. These were published by the Church Missionary Society (CMS) in 1816.

== Sample texts ==
=== The Lord's Prayer ===
Bullom So (Nyländer translation)	English (New King James translation)
Oh Papah hë wonno cheh ko kë foy. Ilille moa u cheh yenkeleng. Baily moa leh hun. Peh na nghah yempy tre pehne n yehmah oh kë upock u tre kë manleh peh na nghah yeo ko kë foy. Nkah hë yempy dyo pallë o pallë. Nlap ndërick mbang n hë kë manleh hë lap nokono hë nyërick mbang ngha tre; M ma hë yuck kë nghehl; nfoke hë kë dyah bang ah tre. Moa bë baily tre, moa bë fossoh buleing, moa bë gbentha bomu tre trim o trim. Amen.	Our Father in heaven, hallowed be Your name. Your kingdom come. Your will be done on earth as it is in heaven. Give us this day our daily bread. And forgive us our debts, as we forgive our debtors. And do not lead us into temptation, but deliver us from the evil one. For Yours is the kingdom and the power and the glory forever. Amen.

=== Excerpt from "A Dialogue between a Christian Missionary and a Native of Bullom" ===
Bullom So	English
1. Ngheuēhnghatukēh, lileh ngha heleh; ërum bulēing ńviss ngha sōsë tre ah?; Foy. Batukeh.: 2. Mpal ë woo ngho Foy ngha ńyërick ń tre manah būlēing?; Mpal ë mainbull.: 3. Yēh Foy ngha boa ë pal ë mainting?; U foll hoa mainting nũ ngha rubah....	1. Who made the heaven, earth, and sea; all trees, beasts, and fishes?; God.: 2. In how many days did God make all these things?; In six days.: 3. What did God on the seventh day?; He rested on the seventh and made it holy....

== Literature ==
- Childs, G. Tucker (2011). A Grammar of Mani. (Mouton Grammar Library; 54.) Berlin; Boston: De Gruyter Mouton. ISBN 978-3-11-026497-5
- Childs, G. Tucker (2007). Hin som sɛk! oma si fɔ mfɔ mmani! (A Mani primer). Portland; OR: Real Estate Publishers, Inc.
- Moity, Marcel (1948). Étude sur la langue mmani (unpublished ms). Dakar: IFAN.
- Moity, Marcel (1957). Notes sure les mani (Guinée Française). Bulletin de l'Institut Français d'Afrique Noire 19:302-307.
- Nyländer, Gustavus Reinhold. 1814. Grammar and Vocabulary of the Bullom Language. London: Christian Missionary Society.
- Pichl, Walter J. (1980). Mmani. In West African Language Data Sheets, vol. 2. M. E. Kropp Dakubu (ed.), 1–6. Accra and Leiden: West African Linguistic Society and African Studies Centre.
