= Victoria A. Fromkin Lifetime Service Award =

The Victoria A. Fromkin Lifetime Service Award is an award named after linguist Victoria Fromkin that is given to a member of the Linguistic Society of America who has performed "extraordinary service to the discipline and to the Society" throughout their career. First presented in 2001, the award is presented annually.

== Recipients ==
- Paul Chapin (2001)
- Kathleen Fenton (2002)
- Anthony Aristar (2003)
- Helen Aristar-Dry (2003)
- Eugene Nida (2004)
- Ivan Sag (2005)
- Margaret W. Reynolds (2006)
- N. Louanna Furbee (2007)
- D. Terence Langendoen (2010)
- Donna Christian (2011)
- Stephen R. Anderson (2014)
- Barbara Partee (2016)
- Roger Shuy (2017)
- Sarah Thomason (2018)
- Larry Hyman (2021)

== See also ==
- Kenneth L. Hale Award
