= Felicity Meakins =

Australian linguist

- Title: Professor
- Awards: Fellow of the Academy of the Social Sciences in Australia (FASSA); Fellow of the Australian Academy of the Humanities (FAHA); Kenneth L. Hale Award

Academic background
- Education: University of Queensland (BA, MA); University of Melbourne (PhD)
- Thesis: The development and function of case morphology in Gurindji Kriol, an Australian mixed language (2008)
- Doctoral advisor: Rachel Nordlinger

Academic work
- Discipline: Linguistics
- Sub-discipline: Australian Aboriginal languages, language revitalization, language documentation
- Institutions: University of Queensland
- Website: University of Queensland webpage

Felicity Meakins FASSA FAHA is a linguist specialising in Australian Indigenous languages, morphology and language contact, who was one of the first academics to describe Gurindji Kriol. As of 2022, she is a professor at the University of Queensland and Deputy Director of the University of Queensland node of the Australian Research Council (ARC) Centre of Excellence for the Dynamics of Language. She holds an ARC Future Fellowship focusing on language evolution and contact processes across northern Australia.

== Education and career ==
Meakins received her Bachelor of Arts (Honours) and Master of Arts at the University of Queensland. She completed her master's thesis, Lashings of Tongue: A Relevance Theoretic Account of Impoliteness, in 2001. Meakins earned her Ph.D. from the University of Melbourne in 2008 for her work with the Aboriginal Child Language Project. Rachel Nordlinger was main supervisor for Meakins' dissertation, Case-marking in contact: the development and function of case morphology in Gurindji Kriol, an Australian mixed language.

A Professor at The University of Queensland, Australia, Mekins also serves as a chief investigator with the ARC Centre of Excellence for the Dynamics of Language (CoEDL).

Meakins and Patrick McConvell were the first linguists to describe Gurindji Kriol, a mixed language which emerged in the Kalkarindji community of northern Australia post-1970s. She has performed fieldwork and facilitated language revitalisation work in this region since 2001 and published extensive documentation of languages in the Ngumpin-Yapa family, including a grammar of Bilinarra and dictionaries of Bilinarra and Gurindji.

Meakins has publicly advocated for greater awareness of Australian Indigenous languages, the benefits of bilingualism and bilingual education for Indigenous children, and Gurindji history. She has published several articles in The Conversation (one of which has been republished in German), performed a TEDx talk and collaborated with Karungarni Arts and rangers from the Murnkurrumurnkurru Central Land Council. Her work chronicling Gurindji oral histories in particular attracted media attention around the fiftieth anniversary of the Wave Hill walk-off.

== Funding grants ==
Meakins received an Australian Research Council (ARC) Discovery Early Career Researcher Award (2014–2017) and two ARC Discovery Projects awards (2009–2013 and 2015–2018).

In June 2017 Meakins was awarded an ARC Future Fellowship, a four-year mid-career award of $896,163, to focus on language evolution and contact processes across northern Australia. The purpose of Future Fellowships is "to attract and retain the best and brightest mid-career researchers".

In 2025, she was awarded the Kathleen Fitzpatrick Australian Laureate Fellowship by the Australian Research Council to further her research into Indigenous languages and how they describe ecological information.

== Awards and recognition ==
In 2020 Meakins was elected Fellow of the Academy of the Social Sciences in Australia (FASSA) and in 2022, Fellow of the Australian Academy of the Humanities.

The Kenneth L. Hale Award was awarded to Meakins in 2022, for her interdisciplinary work with Australian aboriginal communities in northern Australia, including helping with revitalization efforts.

== Selected publications ==
Meakins has authored and edited more than fifty publications as of 2018.

=== Books ===
- Introducing Linguistic Fieldwork. Meakins, Felicity, Jennifer Green and Myfany Turpin. London: Routledge, 2018
- Loss and Renewal: Australian Languages Since Colonisation. Edited by Felicity Meakins and Carmel O'Shannessy Berlin, Germany: De Gruyter Mouton, 2016.
- Mayarni-kari Yurrk: More Stories from Gurindji Country. Edited by Erika Charola and Felicity Meakins Batchelor, NT, Australia: Batchelor Press, 2016.
- Yijarni: True Stories from Gurindji Country. Edited by Erika Charola and Felicity Meakins Canberra, Australia: Aboriginal Studies Press, 2016.
- Kawarla: how to make a coolamon. Wadrill, Violet, Wavehill Yamawurr, Biddy and Meakins, Felicity. Batchelor, NT, Australia: Batchelor Press, 2015.
- A grammar of Bilinarra: an Australian Aboriginal language of the Northern Territory. Meakins, Felicity and Nordlinger, Rachel. Berlin, Germany: Mouton de Gruyter, 2014.
- Bilinarra to English dictionary. Meakins, Felicity. Batchelor, NT, Australia: Batchelor Press, 2013.
- Gurindji to English dictionary. Meakins, Felicity, McConvell, Patrick, Charola, Erika, McNair, Norm, McNair, Helen and Campbell, Lauren. Batchelor, NT, Australia: Batchelor Press, 2013.
- Bilinarra, Gurindji and Malngin plants and animals: Aboriginal knowledge of flora and fauna from Judbarra/Gregory National Park, Nijburru, Kalkarindji and Daguragu, Northern Australia. Hector, Ivy Kulngari, Jungurra Kalabidi, George, Banjo, Spider, Nangari Ngarnjal Dodd, Topsy, Jangala Wirrba Wavehill, Ronnie, Danbayarri, Dandy, Nanaku Wadrill, Violet, Puntiyarri, Bernard, Bernard Malyik, Ida, Wavehill, Biddy, Morris, Helen, Campbell, Lauren, Meakins, Felicity and Wightmann, Glenn. Katherine, NT, Australia: Bilinarra, Gurindji and Malngin People; Department of Land Resource Management, 2012.
- Case-marking in contact: The development and function of case morphology in Gurindji Kriol. Meakins, Felicity. Amsterdam, Netherlands: John Benjamins Publishing Company, 2011.

=== Other ===
- Meakins, Felicity (2014). Language contact varieties. In Harold Koch and Rachel Nordlinger (Ed.), The languages and linguistics of Australia: a comprehensive guide (pp. 365–416) Berlin, Germany: De Gruyter Mouton. doi:10.1515/9783110279771.365
- Meakins, Felicity (2013). Mixed languages. In Peter Bakker and Yaron Matras (Ed.), Contact languages: a comprehensive guide (pp. 159–228) Berlin, Germany: De Gruyter Mouton.
- Meakins, Felicity (2011). Borrowing contextual inflection: evidence from northern Australia. Morphology, 21 1: 57-87. doi:10.1007/s11525-010-9163-4
