= Mel languages =

Branch of Niger–Congo spoken in Guinea-Bissau through Liberia

Mel
- Southern (West) Atlantic [reduced]
- Geographic distribution: Guinea-Bissau through Liberia
- Linguistic classification: Niger–Congo?: Atlantic–Congo; Mel
- Subdivisions: Temne; Bullom–Kissi

Language codes
- ISO 639-3: –
- Glottolog: mela1257

The Mel languages are a branch of Niger–Congo languages spoken in Guinea-Bissau, Guinea, Sierra Leone, and Liberia. The most populous is Temne, with about two million speakers; Kissi is next, with half a million.

== Languages ==
Mel has traditionally been classified as the bulk of a southern branch of a West Atlantic branch of Niger–Congo. However, these are geographic and typological rather than genealogical groups; Segerer (2010) shows that there is no exclusive relationship between Mel and the other southern languages, Sua (Mansoanka) and Gola.

- Mel
  - Temne
    - Temne
    - Baga languages
  - Bullom–Kissi
    - Bullom languages
    - Kissi

Fields (2004) splits Mel into a Highlands group originating in Guinea, and also a Bullom-Kisi-Gola group.

- Mel
  - Bullom-Kisi-Gola
    - Gola
    - Bullom-Kisi
      - Bullom
      - Kisi
  - Highlands
    - Temne
    - Landuma
    - Sitem

Fields (2008:83) proposes that the homeland of Proto-Mel is located in the north-central highlands of Sierra Leone just to the south of the Lesser Scarcies River, rather than on the coast. The homeland of Proto-Highlands is located along the middle stretches of the Konkoure River in Guinea, just to the northeast of Conakry (Fields 2008:85).

== Comparative vocabulary ==
Comparison of basic vocabulary words in the Mel languages from Fields (2004):

Language	eye	ear	nose	tooth	tongue	mouth	blood	bone	tree	water	eat	name
Sitemu	dɔ-fɔr	lʊŋʊs	a-lolYm	de-sek	te-mera	ku-su	me-tyir	kʊ-bɛnt	kʊ-tɔk	dɔ-mun	ki-di	te-we / me-we
Landuma	da-fɔr	a-lʊnʊs, a-rʊns	ta-soth, ta-suth	da-sek	da-mera	kʊ-suŋ	ma-tsir, ma-cir	kʊ-bʊnt	ke-tog, kʊ-tɔɔk	da-mun, m-anc	ki-di	tayif
Temne	for	a-lʊns, a-lʊs	a-suth, a-sot	sek	ra-mer	saŋ	tsir	bant, kʊ-bonth	n-anʈ	m-ant	di; som	bonʈ; n-es
Bullom	foll	nui	min	ɛ-chang	mulliŋ, li–mɛliŋ	ɲɛn	nkong	pah	rum	men	dyo	ilillɛ
Kisi	hɔlten	nileŋ	miŋndo	ciŋnde	diɔ-muleŋ	sondoo	koowaŋ	paa	yɔmndo	mɛŋndaŋ	dio	diolaŋ
Gola	e-fe	nu	e-mia	sia	me-miel, o-mie, meer-o	o-na, ɲa	sa, ma-sei, ma-sen	ke-kpa	ke-kul, kulu	mai, mande, mandi	dze, dzɛ	e-del

Comparison of basic vocabulary words in the Mel languages, and also Sua and Gola, from Wilson (2007): Limba has also been added from Clarke (1922).

Language	eye	ear	nose	tooth	tongue	mouth	blood	bone	tree	water	name; surname
Baga Maduri	da-fɔr / i- / sə-	a-läŋgäs / i-	ta-sot / ma-	da-sek / i-	da-mer / sə-	ku-suŋ / cu-	koonɛ	ke-bant	kə-tɔɔk / i-	ba-mun	ta-we / ma-; lambe (d-)
Baga Sitemu	dɔ-fɔr / Ø- / sə-	a-laŋəs / sə- / Ø-	a-loləm / Ø-	de-sek / Ø-	te-mer / me-	ku-su / cu-	mɛ-tsir		ko-tɔk / tsə-	da-mun	
Baga Koba	da-fɔr / ɛ-	a-rəns / ɛ-	ta-sot / ma-	da-sek / ɛ-	da-mɛr	ku-soŋ / tsə-	ma-tsir	ke-bant / tsə-	kə-tɔk	na-mun	kə-teŋk
Landuma	da-fɔr / ɛ- / sə-	a-ləŋəs / yɛ-	ta-soot / ma	da-sek / ɛ-	da-mera / sə-	kə-suŋ / cə-	ma-cir		kə-tɔɔʐ / yɛ-	da-mun; m-ancs	ta-yif / ma-
Temne	rə-fɔr / ɛ-	ä-ləns / ɛ-	ä-sot̪ / mə-	rə-sek / ɛ-	rə-mer	kə-səŋ / tə-	mə-tir	kə-bänt̪	ŋ-ənt / y-; ä-tɔk 'firewood'	m-änt	ŋ-es / m-
Sherbro	hɔ́l / ti-	nṵ́ɪ́ / ti-	mín / si-	caŋ / n-	(li)màlíŋ / ti-	sùm	ŋkɔ̀ŋ	pak	tɔ̀k	mɛ́n	(i)líl / n-, si-
Mmani	fɔl / thifɔl	nyu / thinyu	min / thimin	caŋ /ncaŋ	di-miliŋ / mamiliŋ	eñɛn / nñɛn	kòó-wáŋ	pak / thipak	yɔ̀m-ndó	m̄ɛn	i–lɛlu / n-lɛlu
Kisi	hɔ̀l-téŋ	nì-léŋ	mǐŋ-ndó	cìŋ-ndé	dìɔ̀mù-léŋ	sòndò-ó	nkong	pàà-	o-thɔk	mɛ̀ŋ-ndáŋ	dìò-
Sua	(n)-fɔn / i-	n-nihi	(r)-seeny / m-	(r)-wɛy / m-	(n)-dɛmɛtɛ / i-	k-tumbu / i-	m-siin	ŋ-wuh	(ŋ)-taany / i-	m-miny	n-wey / i-; n-konto / i-
Gola	éfè	kénû	é-mḭa	késia̰	ómiè, kémiè, kémièl	óńá̰	másḛ̀i, másɛ̀n	kégòa, kégwà	kekuu, kekul	mamal, mamæ	edel
Limba	foya, hoya ha; pl. taya ta	kuluha ko; pl. ŋaliha ŋa	hutini ha; pl. ta ta	hutiti ha; pl. ta ta	filiŋ ha; pl. tafiliŋ ta	foti ha; pl. ta ta	marēŋ ma, masini ma	kutoli ko; pl. ŋa ŋa, ba ba	kuieŋ ko; pl. ŋa ŋa	mandi ma	kēn ko; pl. ŋakēn ŋa

== See also ==
- Rio Nunez languages
