= Landoma language =

Mel language of western Guinea

Landoma
- Native to: Guinea
- Native speakers: 62,000 (2017)
- Language family: Niger–Congo?: Atlantic–Congo; Mel; Temne; Baga; Landoma

Language codes
- ISO 639-3: ldm
- Glottolog: land1256
- ELP: Landoma

Landoma also called Landouman, Landuma, or Cocoli (Cikogoli), is a language of western Guinea. It is the most populous of the Baga languages, in the Mel branch of the Niger–Congo language family. It is related to Temne of Sierra Leone.

There are two different varieties, namely Landoma (Landuma) and Cikogoli (Cocoli). Cikogoli is being replaced by Fula.

The language sometimes goes by the name of one of its dialects, Tiapi, Tyapi, Tyopi a.k.a. Tapessi. Wilson (2007) reports that it is a derogatory name.
