= Elcat =

Elcat or ELCat may refer to:

- Elcat Electric Vehicles
- Catalogue of Endangered Languages (ELCat)
