= Bom language =

Endangered language of Sierra Leone

Bom
- Bom–Krim
- Native to: Sierra Leone
- Native speakers: Krim: less than 15 (2014) "a few hundreds" (no date)
- Language family: Niger–Congo?: Atlantic–Congo; Mel; Bullom–Kissi; Bullom; Northern; Bom
- Dialects: Bom; Krim

Language codes
- ISO 639-3: bmf
- Glottolog: bomk1234
- ELP: Bom; Krim

The Bom language (alternates: Bome; Bomo) is an endangered language of Sierra Leone. It belongs to the Mel branch of the Niger–Congo language family and is particularly closely related to the Bullom So language. Most speakers are bilingual in Mende. Use of the Bom language is declining among members of the ethnic group.

== Speakers ==
The number of speakers range from 15 to 1669 (Census 2015) for Krim and 20 to a few hundred for Bom.

== Classification ==
Bom is a Northern Bullom language. The Krim dialect (also known as Dilan Hassan) is considered by speakers to be distinct, as speakers have separate ethnic identities.
