= Baga languages =

Baga
- Geographic distribution: Coastal Guinea
- Native speakers: c. 30,000
- Linguistic classification: Niger–Congo?: Atlantic–Congo; Mel; Temne; Baga
- Subdivisions: Landoma; Baga proper

Language codes
- Glottolog: None temn1245 (Temne–Baga)

The Baga languages are languages of the Mel family spoken in the coastal region of Guinea. The total number of speakers is about 30,000, of which Landoma speakers make up almost half.

== Languages ==
The varieties apart from Landoma are sometimes considered dialects of one language, Baga or Barka. Landoma is somewhat more distantly related.

- Landoma
- Baga: Binari, Koba, Manduri, Sitemú, etc.

The Baga languages are in turn related to Temne, one of the four official languages of Sierra Leone; together, Baga and Temne belong to the Mel branch of Niger–Congo languages.

== Bibliography ==
- Houis, Maurice (1952) 'Remarques sur la voix passive en Baga', Notes Africaines, 91–92.
- Houis, Maurice (1953) 'Le système pronominal et les classes dans les dialectes Baga, i carte', Bulletin de l'IFAN, 15, 381–404.
- Mouser, Bruce L. (2002) 'Who and where were the Baga?: European perceptions from 1793 to 1821', History in Africa, 29, 337–364.
