= Gola language =

Unclassified language spoken in West Africa

Gola
- Gola, ꖑꕞ
- Native to: Western Liberia & along the border with Sierra Leone
- Ethnicity: Gola
- Native speakers: 200,000 (2019–2020)
- Language family: Niger–Congo?: Atlantic–Congo; Gola
- Dialects: Deng (Todii); Kongba; Senje
- Writing system: Latin script, Vai script, Gola script

Language codes
- ISO 639-3: gol
- Glottolog: gola1255

Gola is a language of Liberia and Sierra Leone. It was traditionally classified as an Atlantic language, but this is no longer accepted in more recent studies.

== Classification ==
Gola is not closely related to other languages and appears to form its own branch of the Niger–Congo language family. Previously, Fields (2004) had classified Gola as a Mel language most closely related to Bullom and Kisi.

== Distribution ==
According to Ethnologue, Gola is spoken in widespread regions across Liberia. It is spoken in Gbarpolu County, Grand Cape Mount County, and Lofa County (between the Mano River and Saint Paul River), as well as in inland areas of Bomi County and Montserrado County.

Dialects are Deng (Todii), Kongba, and Senje.

== Phonology ==
Consonants
	Labial	Alveolar	Palatal	Velar	Labiovelar	Glottal
Plosive	p b	t d	tʃ dʒ	k g	kp gb	
Implosive	ɓ					
Fricative	f v	s z				h
Nasal	m m̥	n n̥	ɲ	ŋ	ŋm	
Approximant	w	l	j			

Vowels
	Front	Central	Back
High	i iː		u uː
Mid-high	e		o
Mid-low	ɛ ɛː		ɔ ɔː
Low		a aː	

There are at least two tones: high and low. Middle, falling, and rising tones can also be found, but may be allophones conditioned by the presence certain consonants that have a lowering or raising effect on the pronunciation of the tone.

== Writing system ==
Multiple writing systems have been used to transcribe the Gola language. Until recently, the Vai script was used across Liberia and Sierra Leone.
