= Sherbro =

Sherbro may refer to:

- Sherbro people, a people of Sierra Leone
- Sherbro language, a language of Sierra Leone
- Sherbro Island, an island off the coast of Sierra Leone
- Sherbro River, a river in Sierra Leone
