= Bijago language =

Senegambian language spoken in Guinea-Bissau

Bidyogo
- Bijago
- Native to: Guinea-Bissau
- Region: Offshore Bissagos Islands
- Native speakers: 36,000 (2022)
- Language family: Niger–Congo?: Atlantic–Congo; Atlantic; Senegambian; Bak; Bidyogo
- Dialects: Kagbaaga; Kajoko (Orango); Anhaqui (Anhaki); Kamona
- Writing system: Latin

Language codes
- ISO 639-3: bjg
- Glottolog: bijo1239

Bijago or Bidyogo is the language of the Bissagos Archipelago of Guinea-Bissau. Bidyogo is the "dominant mother tongue of the archipelago population", though it is not used in schooling there, a role that has been taken over by Kiriol since the 1990s. There are some difficulties of grammar and intelligibility between dialects, with the Kamona dialect being unintelligible to the others.

Dialects are as follows:

- Anhaki on Canhabaque (Roxa) Island
- Kagbaaga on Bubaque Island
- Kajoko on Orango and Uno Islands
- Kamona on the northern Caravela and Carache Islands

== Characteristics ==
The Kajoko dialect is one of the few in the world known to use a linguolabial consonant, the voiced stop [d̼] (or, given that it behaves as a labial consonant, [b̼]), in its basic sound system.

=== Consonants ===
The following table illustrates Bijago's consonant phonemes:

		Labial	Alveolar	Retroflex	Palatal	Velar	Labial- velar	Glottal
Nasal		m	n		ɲ	ŋ		
Plosive/ Affricate	voiceless	p	t	ʈʂ		k	kp	
Plosive/ Affricate	voiced	b̼	d			ɡ	ɡb	
Fricative		β	s		ʒ			(h)
Liquid			r	ɽ	j		w	

=== Vowels ===
	Front	Central	Back
Close	i		u
Close-mid	e		o
Open-mid	ɛ		ɔ
Open		a	

== Classification ==
Bijago is highly divergent. Sapir (1971) classified it as an isolate within the West Atlantic family. However, Segerer showed that this is primarily due to unrecognized sound changes, and that Bijago is in fact close to the Bak languages. For example, the following cognates in Bijago and Joola Kasa (a Bak language) are completely regular, but had not previously been identified:

Classification
Gloss	Bijago	Joola Kasa
head	bu	fu-kow
eye	nɛ	ji-cil

== See also ==
- Bijogo word list (Wiktionary)

== Bibliography ==
- Olson, Kenneth S.; Reiman, D. William; Sabio, Fernando; da Silva, Filipe Alberto (2009). "The voiced linguolabial plosive in Kajoko". Chicago Linguistic Society. 45 (1): 519–530.
- Segerer, Guillaume (1997). La langue bijogo. Oxford: Pergamon Press.
- Segerer, Guillaume (2000). "Lʼorigine des Bijogo : hypothèses de linguiste". In Gaillard, Gérald (ed.). Migrations anciennes et peuplement actuel des Côtes guinéennes. Paris: LʼHarmattan. pp. 183–191.
- Segerer, Guillaume (2002). La langue bijogo de Bubaque (Guinée Bissau). Louvain and Paris: Editions Peeters.
- Segerer, Guillaume; Lionnet, Florian (2010-12-04). 'Isolates' in 'Atlantic'. Language Isolates in Africa. Lyon.
- Wilson, W. A. A. (2000–2001). "Vowel Harmony in Bijagó". Journal of West African Languages. 28 (1): 19–32.
