= Judith Aissen =

Linguistics professor

- Education: Harvard University, PhD, Linguistics, 1974
- Occupation: Linguist
- Known for: Mayan languages, syntax, morphology
- Website: https://people.ucsc.edu/~aissen/

Judith Lillian Aissen (born 4 June 1948) is an American professor emerita in linguistics at the University of California, Santa Cruz.

== Career ==
Aissen began to study Mayan languages in 1972 as a graduate student at Harvard University, conducting field research in San Cristobal de las Casas, Chiapas. Her 1974 Harvard dissertation on The Syntax of Causative Constructions was published by Garland in 1979. She joined the faculty of the University of California, Santa Cruz, in 1983.

Aissen is particularly known for her analysis of Tzotzil and other Mayan languages having abstract obviation systems akin to those described in Algonquian languages as well as for her work on differential object marking. Since 1995, she has been making trips to Chiapas to teach workshops in syntax to linguistics students who are native Mayan language speakers.

== Awards and distinctions ==
On January 3, 2008, she became a fellow of the Linguistic Society of America. In 2011, Aissen's colleagues at University of California, Santa Cruz organized a festschrift in her honor, entitled Representing Language: Essays in Honor of Judith Aissen. In 2018, she was awarded the Linguistic Society of America's Kenneth L. Hale Award "for her energetic documentation of Tzotzil and other Mayan languages, her success at bringing these languages to bear on linguistic theory, and her commitment to the nurturing of Indigenous linguists."

== Selected publications ==
=== Books ===
- Aissen, Judith. The syntax of causative constructions. Vol. 10. Garland Pub., 1979.
- Aissen, Judith. Tzotzil clause structure. Vol. 7. Springer Science & Business Media, 2012.

=== Articles ===
- Aissen, Judith, and David M. Perlmutter. "Clause reduction in Spanish." Annual Meeting of the Berkeley Linguistics Society. Vol. 2. 1976.
- Aissen, Judith. "Topic and focus in Mayan." Language (1992): 43-80.
- Aissen, Judith. "On the syntax of obviation". Language. 73 (1997): 705–750. ISSN 1535-0665. doi:10.1353/lan.1997.0042
- Aissen, Judith. "Markedness and subject choice in Optimality Theory." Natural Language & Linguistic Theory 17.4 (1999): 673-711.
- Aissen, Judith. "Differential object marking: Iconicity vs. economy." Natural Language & Linguistic Theory 21.3 (2003): 435-483.
