= Catalogue of Endangered Languages =

Database of endangered languages

The Catalogue of Endangered Languages (ELCat) is a major resource for information on the endangered languages of the world. It is available to the public via the Endangered Languages Project website.

== Language information ==
The Catalogue of Endangered Languages provides information on each of the world's currently endangered languages. It provides information on:

1. the languages' vitality (their prospects for continued use), such as number of speakers, trends in the number of speakers, intergenerational transmission
2. the language's spheres of use
3. locations, where they are spoken
4. the social, linguistic, economic, political, and geographic context of each endangered language.

The information about each endangered language in ELCat comes from published sources and direct communications from individuals with specialized knowledge of specific endangered languages. All information provided in the Catalogue is referenced to its original source (e.g. journal article, book, personal communication, etc.), and information from multiple different sources is provided for each language, where available.

Users of the Endangered Languages Project website are encouraged to contribute suggestions for improving the information in the Catalogue. All user suggestions are reviewed by Regional Directors, specialists in the languages of specific regions of the globe.

Discoveries made as the Catalogue was created have resulted in new knowledge about the world's languages. For example, on the one hand, many languages included in other reference works proved spurious, either not to exist or not to be distinct from other languages, and were removed; on the other hand, ELCat has added 260 new languages not identified by the ISO 639-3 standard. ELCat has found that 45% of all currently-spoken languages are endangered, based on the 3116 still-spoken endangered languages in ELCat compared to the 6861 still-living languages listed by Ethnologue. ELCat finds that 299 languages have fewer than 10 speakers and that 792 are "critically" or "severely" endangered. Importantly, contrary to the often-repeated claim that a language becomes extinct every two weeks, ELCat discovered that on average about one language each three months becomes extinct, about 4 per year.

== Background and personnel ==
The Catalogue of Endangered Languages was developed by the linguistics departments at the University of Hawaiʻi at Mānoa (UHM) and Eastern Michigan University (EMU) between 2011 and 2016. The structure of ELCat was designed during the National Science Foundation-funded workshop on the Endangered Languages Information and Infrastructure Project (ELIIP), held at the University of Utah in 2009. The development ELCat was funded by the National Science Foundation and the Henry Luce Foundation, under the supervision of Principal Investigators Lyle Campbell (UHM) and Anthony Aristar, Helen Aristar-Dry, and later Veronica Grondona (EMU). ELCat and the Endangered Languages Project website are now permanently housed at the University of Hawaiʻi at Mānoa, with ELCat under the direction of Gary Holton (UHM).

During its construction phase (2011-2016), ELCat was supervised by a board of Regional Directors, linguists with expertise in specific regions of the world. From 2017 onward, the data in ELCat will be supervised by an International Board of Directors, a group of scholars with expertise in endangered languages, currently chaired by Bill Palmer (University of Newcastle, Australia).

Funded research to compile the bulk of the Catalogue ended in 2016; however, maintenance and hosting of the Catalogue's database and its contents will continue indefinitely at the University of Hawaii. This includes processing and implementation of user suggestions and feedback, as well as addition of information from newly available sources about endangered languages.

== Language Endangerment Index (LEI) ==
The Language Endangerment Index (LEI) provides a numeric rating of a language's endangerment, based on four primary factors. These factors, and the levels and descriptions for each, are outlined below.

	5 Critically endangered	4 Severely endangered	3 (Moderately) endangered	2 Threatened	1 Vulnerable	0 Safe
Number	1-9	10-99	100-999	1000-9999	10,000-99,999	≥ 100,000
Transmission	only a few elderly speakers	Many of the grandparent generation speak the language, but the younger people generally do not.	Some adults in the community are speakers, but the language is not spoken by children.	Most adults in the community are speakers, but children generally are not.	Most adults and some children are speakers.	All members of the community, including children, speak the language.
Trends	A small percentage of the community speaks the language, and speaker numbers are decreasing very rapidly.	Less than half of the community speaks the language, and speaker numbers are decreasing at an accelerated pace.	Only about half of community members speak the language. Speaker numbers are decreasing steadily, but not at an accelerated pace.	A majority of community members speak the language. Speaker numbers are gradually decreasing.	Most members of the community speak the language. Speaker numbers may be decreasing, but very slowly.	Almost all community members speak the language, and speaker numbers are stable or increasing.
Domains	Used only in a few very specific domains, such as in ceremonies, songs, prayer, proverbs, or certain limited domestic activities.	Used mainly just in the home and/or with family, and may not be the primary language even in these domains for many community members.	Used mainly just in the home and/or with family, but remains the primary language of these domains for many community members.	Used in some nonofficial domains along with other languages, and remains the primary language used in the home for many community members.	Used in most domains except for official ones such as government, mass media, education, etc.	Used in most domains, including official ones such as government, mass media, education, etc.

Intergenerational transmission is considered the most important factor in linguistic vitality, and is thus accorded twice the weight of each of the other factors in the scoring algorithm. The scores for each factor are compiled to produce a composite percentage; according to the percentage, the language is assigned to an endangerment level (e.g. a score of 72% would be LEI level 5, "Severely Endangered").

$LEI = { Number + IntergenTrans * 2 + Trends + Domains \over highest\ attainable\ score\ with\ given\ factors} * 100$

ELCat also assesses a confidence level for the LEI by calculating the number of factors used to compute the LEI. Again, the intergenerational transmission factor is weighted doubly in this calculation. An LEI which employs information from all four factors would thus have a confidence level of 100%, while an LEI which uses only the speaker numbers and intergenerational transmission factor would have a confidence level of 60%.
