= Baga language =

Temne dialect cluster spoken in Guinea

Baga
- Barka
- Native to: Guinea
- Ethnicity: Baga
- Native speakers: Koga: No data Sitemu: 40,000 (2018); Mandari: 4,000 (2011); Kaloum: Extinct by the 1950s Sobané: Extinct by the 1950s
- Language family: Niger–Congo?: Atlantic–Congo; Mel; Temne; Baga languages; Baga

Language codes
- ISO 639-3: Variously: bgo – Koga bsp – Sitemu bmd – Mandari bqf – Kaloum (spurious) bsv – Sobané (spurious)
- Glottolog: temn1245 adds Temne & Landoma
- Baga Manduri is classified as Definitely Endangered, Baga Sitemu is classified as Severely Endangered, Baga Mboteni is classified as Critically Endangered, and Baga Kalem is classified as Extinct by the UNESCO Atlas of the World's Languages in Danger.

Baga, or Barka, is a dialect cluster spoken by the Baga people of coastal Guinea. The name derives from the mispronounced Arabic phrase bae raka (bae = sellers and raka = slaves) and understood by the locals as 'people of the seaside' outcast people. Most Baga are bilingual in the Mande language Susu, the official regional language. Two ethnically Baga communities, Sobané and Kaloum, are known to have abandoned their (unattested) language altogether in favour of Susu.

== Varieties ==
The varieties as distinct enough to sometimes be considered different languages. They are:

Baga Koga (Koba)
Baga Manduri (Maduri, Mandari)
Baga Sitemu (Sitem, Sitemú, Stem Baga, Rio Pongo Baga)

The extinct Baga Kaloum and Baga Sobané peoples had spoken Koga and Sitemu, respectively.

Neighboring Baga Pokur is not closely related.

== Geographical distribution ==
Geographical distribution of Baga varieties, listed from north to south, according to Fields-Black (2008:85):

- Baga Mandori: coast of Guinea, north of the mouth of the Nunez River
- Baga Sitem: coast of Guinea, south of the mouth of the Nunez River
- Baga Kakissa: coast of Guinea, north of the mouth of the Pongo River
- Baga Koba: coast of Guinea, from south of the mouth of the Pongo River to north of the mouth of the Konkouré River
- Baga Kalum: Îles de Los and area surrounding Conakry

Geographical distribution and demographics of Baga varieties according to Wilson (2007), citing a 1997 colloquium talk at Lille by Erhard Voeltz:

- Baga Manduri: spoken at Dobale, and very similar to Citɛm.
- Baga Sitemu (properly Citɛm): spoken in a cluster of villages on the Campaces River. This is the only vibrant Baga linguistic variety.
- Baga Sobane: only two known speakers in an isolated location.
- Baga Marara: spoken on three islands in the Rio Pongo. It is still being spoken by children.
- Baga Koba: spoken near Kaporo town only by elderly speakers over age 60. It is reportedly very similar to Baga Kaloum.
- Baga Kaloum: originally spoken in a quarter of what is now the Conakry area, and in the Îles de Los. It is close to Temne. Only spoken in a remote area now.

== Noun class systems ==
Baga has prefixes for eight noun classes:

Variety	1	2	3	4	5	6	7	8
Baga Maduri	o- or none	a-	a-	i-	kə-	da-	cə-	sə-
Bagu Sitemu	wi- or none	a-	a-	none	kə-	da-	cə-	sə-
Baga Koba	i-	a-	a-	ɛ-	kə-	da-	cə-	sə-

== Vocabulary ==
Below is a selection of basic vocabulary in Baga Maduri:

- aceen - dog
- iceen - dogs
- alomp - fish
- asɔɔp - pig
- atɔf - earth, land
- daboomp da-ka-obɛ - the chief's head
- daboomp da-wana - the cow's head
- dafɔr - eye
- dasek - tooth
- isek - teeth
- gbak - hang
- kəca - hand, arm
- waca - hands, arms
- kufoon - hair
- mun - drink
- tafac - iron
- gbup - turn onto front
