= Guillaume Segerer =

French linguist

- Occupation: Linguist

Academic background
- Education: Sorbonne Nouvelle University Paris 3
- Thesis: Description de la langue bijogo (Guinée Bissau) (2000)
- Doctoral advisor: France Cloarec-Heiss

Academic work
- Discipline: Linguistics
- Sub-discipline: Descriptive linguistics, historical linguistics, linguistic typology
- Institutions: French National Centre for Scientific Research (CNRS)
- Website: www.guillaumesegerer.fr

Guillaume Segerer (born July 13, 1965, in Paris, France) is a French linguist who specializes in Niger-Congo languages, especially the Atlantic languages.

Segerer is known for his historical-comparative work on the Atlantic languages.

== Education ==
In 2000, Segerer obtained his doctorate from Sorbonne Nouvelle University Paris 3. His doctorate thesis was a description of the Bijogo language of Guinea-Bissau.

He has been employed at the CNRS since 2001, where he mostly worked at LLACAN (Langage, langues et cultures d'Afrique), a Unité mixte de recherche (UMR) within the CNRS. Since 2007, Segerer has been employed as a full researcher at LLACAN.

== Projects ==
Some projects that Segerer has worked on include the following.

- RefLex (Reference Lexicon of the languages of Africa)
- Web-Ball (Web Bibliography of African Languages and Linguistics)
- Web-Cal (Web Catalogue of African Languages)
