= Aminah McCloud =

American professor in religion

Aminah Beverly McCloud (born 1948) is Professor of Religious Studies and Director of Islamic World Studies program at DePaul University. Her areas of expertise include Islam in America, Muslim women, Islamic studies and the history, geography, politics, religion and philosophy of Islam. She is the author and co-author of several books. Professor McCloud is also the Editor in Chief of the Journal of Islamic Law and Culture, and a member of the board of advisors of the Institute for Social Policy and Understanding (ISPU).

Professor Ali Asani of Harvard University has described Professor McCloud as "one of the most eminent scholars of African American Islam"

== Publications ==
- African-American Islam (1995)
- Questions of Faith (1999)
- Transnational Muslims in American Society (2006)
- An Introduction to Islam in the 21st Century (2013)
