= Oliver Loode =

Estonian human rights activist

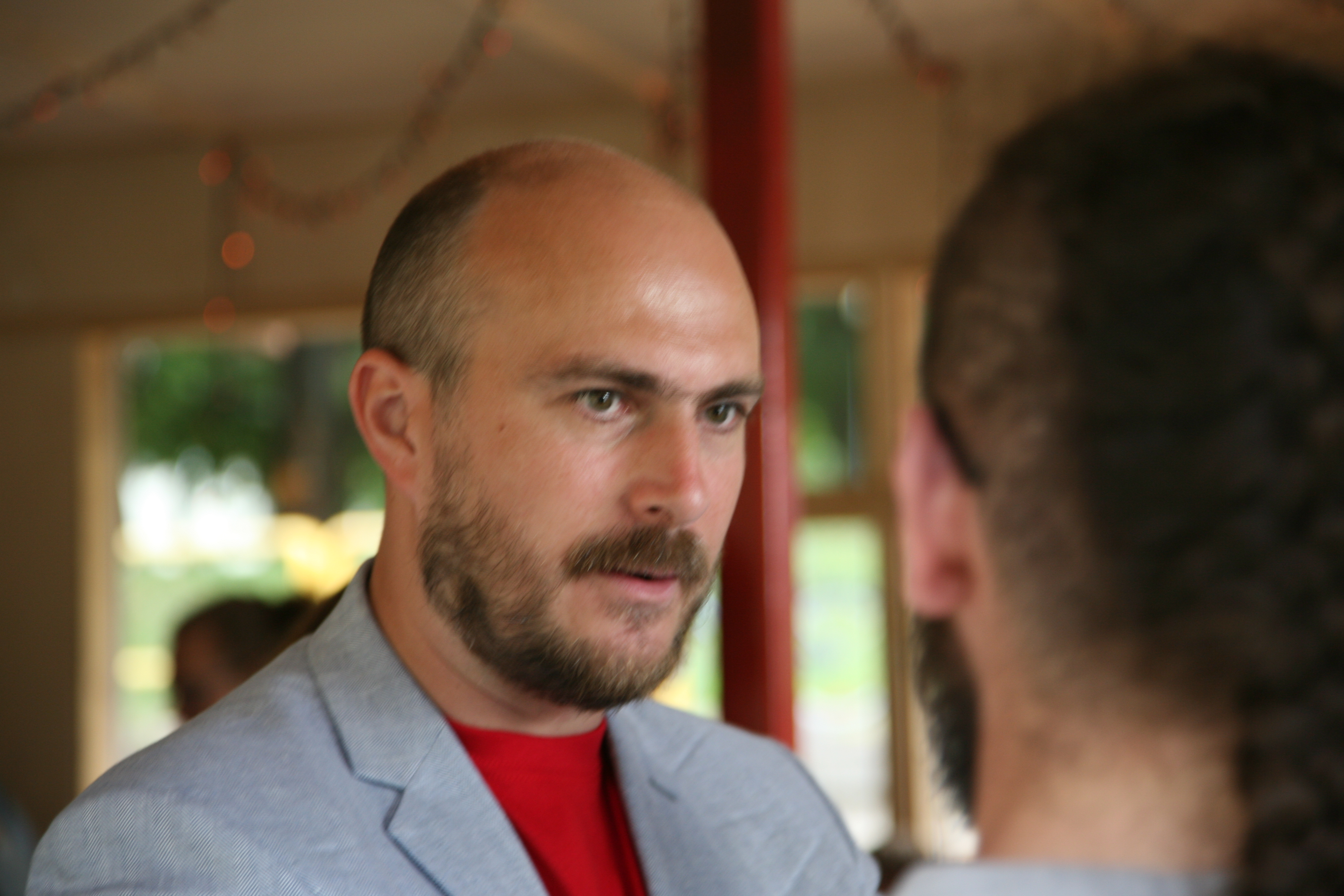
Oliver Loode on the conference of Fenno-Ugric youth organization MAFUN in Estonia, Tartu in 2015

Oliver Loode (born March 19, 1974, in Tallinn) is an Estonian human rights activist of the international Finno-Ugric movement and Member of United Nations Permanent Forum on Indigenous Issues (UNPFII) for the term 2014–2016.

== Career ==
In 2011–2013 Oliver Loode represented Estonia in the Youth Association of Finno-Ugric Peoples (MAFUN). During that period he was one of the initiators of the Finno-Ugric Capital of Culture programme. In 2013–2015, Loode was board member of NPO Fenno-Ugria. Since 2014, Oliver Loode serves as Expert Member of United Nations Permanent Forum on Indigenous Issues (UNPFII), nominated by Estonian Ministry of Foreign Affairs. In April 2015 Loode was appointed as vice-chair of the 14th Session of UNPFII. From 2015 to 2017, he worked as Head of Cultural Programmes at Minority Rights Group International.

In 2018 Loode received a 55-year ban from entering Russia, possibly due to his activism in Crimea.

In June 2024, the Russian government added the URALIC Centre of Indigenous Peoples, an organization Loode founded, to a list of extremist groups operating in Russia. This opens the group's organizers, participants, and supporters to criminal prosecution.

== Education ==
Oliver Loode graduated from the Wharton School of the University of Pennsylvania in 1997 with a Bachelor of Sciences in Economics degree (Magna Cum Laude).
