= Myfany Turpin =

Australian musicologist and linguist

Myfany Turpin is an Australian professor of music and linguistics and associate dean of Indigenous strategy and services at the University of Sydney.

Turpin specialises in ethnomusicology, linguistics, anthropological linguistics and ethnobiology. One of her primary fields of interest is the relationship between language and music and ways to support of continuation and revival of traditional song and, more generally, performance arts.

Turpin has primarily focused on the Kaytetye language from Central Australia and she has been working with Kaytetye people since 1996 and has published a series of learning guides, picture dictionaries and dictionaries of this language. In 2005 she completed her PhD on this topic: Form and meaning of Akwelye: a Kaytetye women's song series from Central Australia (2005).

More recently, in 2023, Turpin supported Kaytetye communities in the creation of Kaytetyemoji, a set of Indigenous language emojis, which is part of the Indigemoji project. This project worked closely with the community and saw the creation of a total of 122 emojis including 44 specific to life of Kaytetye Country. It also looked at how digital learning tools can support language revitalisation, assist in community resource development and embraced the communities existing multimodality. It did this by using symbolic art and drawing from Akitiri Sign Language.

However, in 2024, as a co-author of Yuupurnju: A Warlpiri Song Cycle (2024) Turpin focused on the Warlpiri language and worked closely alongside Henry Jakamarra. In this book Jakamarra sung the music while she undertook the rhythmic annotation for it.

== Selected publications ==
- Turpin, M. (2000). A Learner's Guide to Kaytetye. Alice Springs, NT: IAD Press.
- Turpin, M. (2003). Kaytete Picture Dictionary. Alice Springs: IAD Press.
- Turpin, M. (2003). Growing Up Kaytetye: Stories by Tommy Kngwarraye Thompson. Alice Springs: Jukurrpa books: an imprint of IAD Press.
- Turpin, M., Nangala Ross, A. (2012). Kaytetye to English Dictionary. Alice Springs: IAD Press.
- Turpin, M., Nangala Ross, A. (2013). Antarrengeny Awely. Alyawarr women's traditional ceremony of Antarrengeny country. Darwin: Batchelor Press.
- Meakins, F., Green, J., Turpin, M. (2018). Understanding Linguistic Fieldwork. Oxon: Routledge.
- Myfany Turpin; Felicity Meakins (2019). Songs from the Stations. Wajarra as sung by Ronnie Wavehill Wirrpnga, Topsy Dodd Ngarnjal and Dandy Danbayarri. doi:10.2307/j.ctvd1c7xg. ISBN 978-1-74332-584-1. JSTOR 10.2307/j.ctvd1c7xg. Wikidata Q136673277.
- Santo, W., Anderson, A., Nancarrow, C., Turpin, M. (2023). Yaru! Gudjal learner's guide and dictionary. Canberra: Aboriginal Studies Press.
- Jakamarra, H., Jangala, J., Japanangka, S., Jampijinpa, W., O'Shannessy, C., Turpin, M. (2024). Yuupurnju: A Warlpiri Song Cycle. Sydney: Sydney University Press.
