= Linguist List =

Online resource

The LINGUIST List is an online resource for the academic field of linguistics. It was founded by Anthony Aristar in early 1990 at the University of Western Australia, and is used as a reference by the National Science Foundation in the United States. Its main and oldest feature is the premoderated electronic mailing list, with subscribers all over the world.

== History ==
Between 1991 and 2013, the service was run by Anthony Aristar and Helen Aristar-Dry. In 1991, it moved from Australia to Texas A&M University, and Eastern Michigan University was established as the main editing site. By 1994, there were over 5,000 subscribers. From 14 October through 6 November 1996, it held its first on-line conference, Geometric and Thematic Structure in Binding, devoted to the Binding Theory and opened by the keynote address by Howard Lasnik. LINGUIST List moved from Texas A&M to its own site in 1997. Wayne State University in Michigan was established as the second editing site in 1998, but in 2006 all its operations moved to nearby Eastern Michigan University. In 2013, Aristar-Dry and Aristar retired from Eastern Michigan University and Damir Cavar became the moderator and director of operations. In 2014, LINGUIST List was moved to Indiana University and Malgorzata E. Cavar became the second moderator. In 2018, Damir Cavar was replaced as moderator by Malgorzata E. Cavar. LINGUIST List was hosted at the Department of Linguistics at Indiana University until June 2025. Since July 2025, LINGUIST List has been hosted by the Linguistic Research Infrastructure at the University of Zurich and Steven Moran is the executive director and moderator. LINGUIST List is owned by the eLinguistics Foundation, a U.S. 501(c)(3) not for profit organization.

LINGUIST List is funded by its donations from supporting publishers, institutions and its subscribers during the fund drive month each spring. Some LINGUIST List projects were funded by grants from the National Science Foundation. In recent years it has become a site for research into linguistic infrastructure on the web, and has received numerous grants from the National Science Foundation to do this work.

== Services ==
The LINGUIST List hosts two mailing lists LINGUIST and LINGLITE:

- LINGUIST, a mailing list that forwards all postings to the subscriber directly or as a daily digest.
- LINGLITE, a mailing list that forwards once a day a list of postings with titles and links to the subscribers.

The LINGUIST List mailing lists are free and open for subscription using a web interface.

Everybody can submit postings to The LINGUIST List lists without being subscribed or in any way a registered member. A web interface is used to submit postings to the lists.

== Projects ==
The LINGUIST List has been one of the resources for the creation of the new ISO 639-3 language identification standard (aiming to classify all known languages with an alpha-3 language code). While the Ethnologue was used as the resource for natural languages currently in use, Linguist List has provided the information on historic varieties, ancient languages, international auxiliary languages and constructed languages.

The LINGUIST List has also received grants for

- the Catalogue of Endangered Languages project, a joint effort with the University of Hawaiʻi at Mānoa to build the most reliable, up-to-date source of information on the world's endangered languages
- the EMELD Project, designed to build infrastructure to facilitate the preservation of endangered languages data
- the DATA project, designed to digitise data for the Dena'ina language
- the LL-MAP project (defunct), designed to produce a comprehensive GIS site for language;
- the MultiTree project, designed to produce a complete database and tree-viewing facility to study language relationships. Charged by ISO 639 to house data on coded languages that went extinct before c. 1950.
- the AARDVARC project, designed to address the problem of not transcribed, and therefore unavailable, documentation of understudied languages by building an interdisciplinary community of linguists, anthropologists, and computer scientists to share knowledge and collaborate on the specification of a repository and suite of tools to facilitate automatic or semi-automatic transcription and analysis of audio and visual information

The EMELD project was the instigator of the GOLD ontology, the furthest advanced of the current attempts to build an ontology for the morphosyntax of linguistic data. It has also produced a phonetics ontology, based upon Peter Ladefoged's and Ian Maddieson's The Sounds of the World's Languages.

Some projects emerged from funded or internal activities at LINGUIST List:

- GeoLing, a GIS-based information service that places events, jobs, institutions, conferences, and other announcements with a geo-location that are announced on LINGUIST List on the global map.
- AskALing, a discussion forum and question and answer platform for linguistically relevant questions and issues.
- GORILLA, a platform for archiving of language data, recordings, word lists, corpora, and technologies, and the development and conversion of language data to corpora and resources that bridge language documentation of low-resourced and endangered languages, and Human Language Technology (HLT) and Natural Language Processing (NLP).

== See also ==
- Wikipedia:WikiProject Languages/List of ISO 639-3 language codes used locally by Linguist List
