= Rachel Nordlinger =

Australian linguist

Rachel Nordlinger FAHA is an Australian linguist and a professor at The University of Melbourne.

== Education ==
After completing a master's degree at The University of Melbourne, she received her PhD in linguistics in 1997 from Stanford University.

== Research ==
Her research focuses on Indigenous Australian languages, and is based on fieldwork undertaken with Bilinarra, Wambaya, Gudanji, Murrinhpatha and Marri Ngarr communities. Her theoretical interests include syntactic and morphological theory, particularly Lexical Functional Grammar and its application to the complex grammatical structures of Australian Indigenous Languages. She has published widely on these topics in international journals, in addition to authoring four books. In other writing and interviews, she has discussed the importance of supporting the use and transmission of Indigenous Languages in Australia.

== Career ==
Nordlinger is currently Professor in the School of Languages and Linguistics at The University of Melbourne, and is Chief Investigator in the Australian Research Council (ARC) Centre of Excellence for the Dynamics of Language, and Director of the Research Unit for Indigenous Language. Nordlinger was Vice-President of the Australian Linguistic Society in 2003-2004 and President from 2005-2007, as well as a member of the Nominating Committee of the Association of Linguistic Typology and Chair of the International Lexical Functional Grammar Association in 2011-12. In November 2017 she was elected fellow of the Australian Academy of the Humanities.

== Key publications ==
- 2014: Meakins, F., and R. Nordlinger. A Grammar of Bilinarra: An Australian Aboriginal Language of the Northern Territory. Walter de Gruyter.
- 2014: Koch, H. and R. Nordlinger. The Languages and Linguistics of Australia. Mouton de Gruyter.
- 2004: Nordlinger, R. and L. Sadler. Nominal tense in cross-linguistic perspective. Language 80(4): 776-806.
- 1998: Nordlinger, R. A Grammar of Wambaya. Pacific Linguistics.
- 1998: Nordlinger, R. Constructive Case: Evidence from Australian languages. CSLI Publications.
