= Sherman Jackson =

American Islamic studies scholar

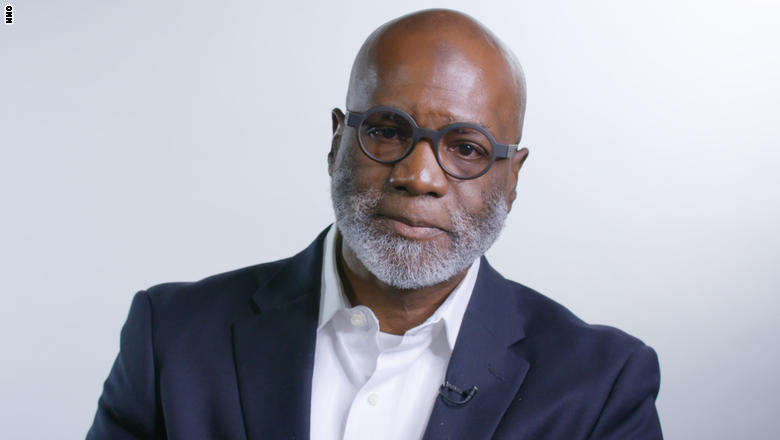

Academic background
- Education: University of Pennsylvania
- Doctoral advisor: George Makdisi

Academic work
- Discipline: Islamic studies
- Institutions: University of Southern California

Sherman A. Jackson, also known as Abdul Hakim Jackson (born 1956) is an American scholar of Islam.

== Career ==
Jackson is the King Faisal Chair of Islamic Thought and Culture and Professor of Religion and American Studies and Ethnicity at the University of Southern California. Jackson was formerly the Arthur F. Thurnau Professor of Near Eastern Studies, visiting professor of law and professor of Afro-American Studies at the University of Michigan.

Jackson received his Ph.D. from the University of Pennsylvania and has taught at the University of Texas at Austin, Indiana University, Wayne State University and the University of Michigan. From 1987 to 1989, he served as executive director of the Center of Arabic Study Abroad in Cairo, Egypt. He is author of several books, including Islamic Law and the State: The Constitutional Jurisprudence of Shihâb al-Dîn al-Qarâfî (E.J. Brill, 1996), On the Boundaries of Theological Tolerance in Islam: Abû Hâmid al-Ghazâlî's Faysal al-Tafriqa (Oxford, 2002), Islam and the Blackamerican: Looking Towards the Third Resurrection (Oxford, 2005) and Islam and the Problem of Black Suffering (Oxford, 2009).

Jackson has been featured on the Washington Post-Newsweek blog, "On Faith," as well as the Huffington Post. In 2009 and 2012,

== Works ==
- Islamic Law and the State: The Constitutional Jurisprudence of Shihāb al-Dīn al-Qarāfī. BRILL. 1996. ISBN 978-90-04-10458-7.
- On the Boundaries of Theological Tolerance in Islam: Abû Hâmid al-Ghazâlî’s Faysal al-Tafriqa, Oxford University Press, 2002, ISBN 978-0-19-579791-6
- Islam and the Blackamerican: Looking Toward the Third Resurrection. Oxford University Press. 2005. ISBN 978-0-19-518081-7.
- Islam and the Problem of Black Suffering. Oxford University Press. 2009. ISBN 978-0-19-538206-8.
- Sufism for Non-Sufis? Ibn Ata' Allah's Tâj al-'Arûs. Oxford University Press. 2012. ISBN 978-0199873678.
- Initiative to Stop the Violence: Sadat's Assassins and the Renunciation of Political Violence. Yale University Press. 2015. ISBN 978-0300196771.
- The Islamic Secular. Oxford University Press. 2023. ISBN 9780197661789.
