= Bullom languages =

Group of languages spoken in Sierra Leone

Bullom
- Geographic distribution: coastal Guinea
- Linguistic classification: Niger–Congo?: Atlantic–Congo; Mel; Bullom–Kisi; Bullom
- Subdivisions: Northern Bullom; Southern Bullom

Language codes
- Glottolog: bull1246

The Bullom languages are a small group of Mel languages spoken in Sierra Leone, including along the Bullom Shore. They were historically sometimes referred to as one language or dialect continuum, divided into Southern Bullom (Krim and Sherbro) and Northern Bullom (Bullom So). The languages are:

Bom (Krim), Bullom So (Mmani), Sherbro.

They are closely related to Kissi.
