= Helen Aristar-Dry =

American linguist

Helen Aristar-Dry is an American linguist who currently serves as the series editor for SpringerBriefs in Linguistics. Most notably, from 1991 to 2013 she co-directed The LINGUIST List with Anthony Aristar. She has served as principal investigator or co-Principal Investigator on over $5,000,000 worth of research grants from the National Science Foundation and the National Endowment for the Humanities. She retired as Professor of English Language and Literature from Eastern Michigan University in 2013.

== Education and career ==
Aristar-Dry graduated magna cum laude with a B.A. in English and French from Southern Methodist University in 1967, and received her M.A. in English and linguistics from the University of Texas at Austin in 1973. She received her Ph.D. in linguistics from the University of Texas at Austin in 1975, where she wrote a dissertation entitled Syntactic Reflexes of Point of View in Emma.

Aristar-Dry has held appointments at Eastern Michigan University (1991–2013), the University of Texas at Austin (1989), the University of Texas at San Antonio (1977–1988), and Auburn University (1975–1977). She was a Fulbright Professor at Universitet i Tromsø in 1989–90. Aristar-Dry has also taught at the Linguistic Society of America Summer Institute (2003), the CoLang (InField) Institute for Collaborative Language Research (2008 and 2012), and the Summer School on Computational Linguistics (2010).

In 1991, Aristar-Dry joined Anthony Aristar as the co-moderator of The LINGUIST List, a major online resource for the field of Linguistics. She served as the co-moderator of the LINGUIST List until her retirement in 2013. In 2006, Aristar-Dry became the co-director of the Institute for Language and Information Technology (ILIT), an autonomous research center at Eastern Michigan University, which consolidated the LINGUIST List and various research projects under one roof until the LINGUIST List moved to Indiana University in 2014.

During her time at LINGUIST List and ILIT, Aristar-Dry oversaw many research projects to improve digital infrastructure for linguistics, including the Electronic Metastructure for Endangered Languages Data (E-MELD) project; the Dena'ina Archiving, Training & Access (DATA) project; Multi-Tree; LL-Map; and the Rendering Endangered Languages Lexicons Interoperable Through Standards Harmonization (RELISH) project. She also mentored many linguistics graduate students.

== Awards ==
In 2003, Aristar-Dry was awarded the Linguistic Society of America's Victoria Fromkin Lifetime Service Award, along with Anthony Aristar, for establishing and moderating the LINGUIST List.

== Selected grants ==
Aristar-Dry has served as the Principal Investigator or co-Principal Investigator of numerous federal grants. Some of these include:

- National Science Foundation grant: AARDVARC: Automatically Annotated Repository of Digital Video and Audio Recordings Community (BCS1244713: $84,182). 2012–2014.
- National Science Foundation grant: MultiTree: A Digital Library of Language Relationships. (BCS 0445714: $242,607). 2005–2009.
- National Science Foundation grant: Collaborative Research: Endangered Languages Catalog (ELCat). (BCS 1057725: $151,455). Collaborators: University of Hawaii at Manoa, Google Foundation. 2011–2014.
- National Science Foundation grant: ICE: Integrating Cartographic Elements: Creating Resources Emphasizing Arctic Materials (OPP-0952335: $322,923). 2009–2012.
- National Endowment for the Humanities grant: RELISH: Rendering Endangered Languages Lexicons Interoperable Through Standards Harmonization (DFG/NEH Joint Digitization Program: HG50010: $160,793), 2009–2012.
- National Science Foundation grant: ELIIP: Endangered Languages Information and Infrastructure Project (DEL-0924127: $39,566), 2009–11.
- National Science Foundation grant: Collaborative Research: LEGO: Lexicon Enhancement via the GOLD Ontology (BCS-0753321: $636,443), 2008–2013.
- National Science Foundation grant: Collaborative Research: Implementing the GOLD Community of Practice: Laying the Foundations for a Linguistics Cyberinfrastructure (BCS 0720122: $87,140.00), 2007–2011.
- National Science Foundation grant: Workshop: Towards the Interoperability of Language Resources (BCS 0709680:, $13,334.00). 2007–2008.
- National Science Foundation grant: LL-MAP: Language and Location, a Map Annotation Project (HSD 0527512, $633,024). 2006–2011.
- National Science Foundation grant: The ALL Language Project, a collaborative grant with the Rosetta Project, Stanford University, University of Pennsylvania, and the Endangered Language Fund. (NSDL-0333530: $96,525). 2003–2006.
- National Science Foundation grant: DATA: Dena'ina Archiving, Training, and Access. (OPP-0326805: $342,942) 2003–2008.
- National Science Foundation grant: E-MELD: Electronic Metastructure for Endangered Languages Data (SES-0094934: $2,142,913.00), 2001–2007.
- National Science Foundation grant: Database Design for Endangered Languages Data (BCS-0003197: $55,000) 2000–2002.
- National Science Foundation grant: The LINGUIST List Multi-List Support Project (SBR-9975299: $173,025), 1999–2001.
- National Science Foundation grant: Software Development for The LINGUIST List (SBR-9601352: $114,962), 1996–98.
- National Science Foundation grant: LINGUIST Software Development (SBR-9311748: $4000), 1993–94.

== Publications ==
=== Books ===
- Text, Time, and Context: Selected Papers by Carlota S. Smith. (Ed. with Richard Meier & Emily Destruel). Springer Press. 2010.
- Using Computers in Linguistics: A Practical Guide. (Ed. with John Lawler). Routledge, 1998.

=== Selected articles ===
- Creating a serialization of LMF: the experience of the RELISH project (with Windhouwer, M.A., J. Petro, I. Nevskaya, S. Drude, and J. Gippert). LMF: Lexical Markup Framework, theory and practice, ed. by Gil Francopoulo. 2013. Wiley Publishers.
- Rendering Endangered Lexicons Interoperable through Standards Harmonization": The RELISH Project (with Drude, S., Windhouwer, M., Gippert, J., & Nevskaya, I. ). In N. Calzolari (Ed.), Proceedings of the Eighth International Conference on Language Resources and Evaluation (LREC 2012), Istanbul, May 23–25, 2012 (pp. 766–770). European Language Resources Association (ELRA).
- Language and Location: Map Annotation Project – A GIS-Based Infrastructure for Linguistics Information Management (with Yichun Xie, Anthony Aristar, Hunter Lockwood). Proceedings of the International Multiconference on Computer Science and Information Technology. Vol 4, 2009: 305–311.
- The E-MELD School of Best Practices: A Community-Driven Resource (with Jessica Boynton and Steve Moran). In Language Documentation: Practice and Values (ed. Lenore Grenoble and Louanna Furbee). Benjamins. 2010. 133–46.
