= Endangered Languages Project =

Fundraiser and Organization for Endangered Languages

Endangered Languages Project (ELP)
- Available in: Multilingual (7)
- Founded: June 2012
- Website: www.endangeredlanguages.com
- Current status: Active

The Endangered Languages Project (ELP) is a worldwide collaboration between indigenous language organizations, linguists, institutions of higher education, and key industry partners to strengthen endangered languages. The foundation of the project is a website, which launched in June 2012.

== History ==
The ELP was launched in June 2012 with the intention of being a "comprehensive, up-to-date source of information on the endangered languages of the world" according to the director of the Catalogue of Endangered Languages (ELCat), Lyle Campbell, a professor of linguistics in the Mānoa College of Languages, Linguistics and Literature. He expressed that the "... Catalogue is needed to support documentation and revitalization of endangered languages, to inform the public and scholars, to aid members of groups whose languages are in peril, and to call attention to the languages most critically in need of conservation.” For example, the organization classifies the Canadian Métis language Michif as critically endangered due to the declining number of its fluent speakers.

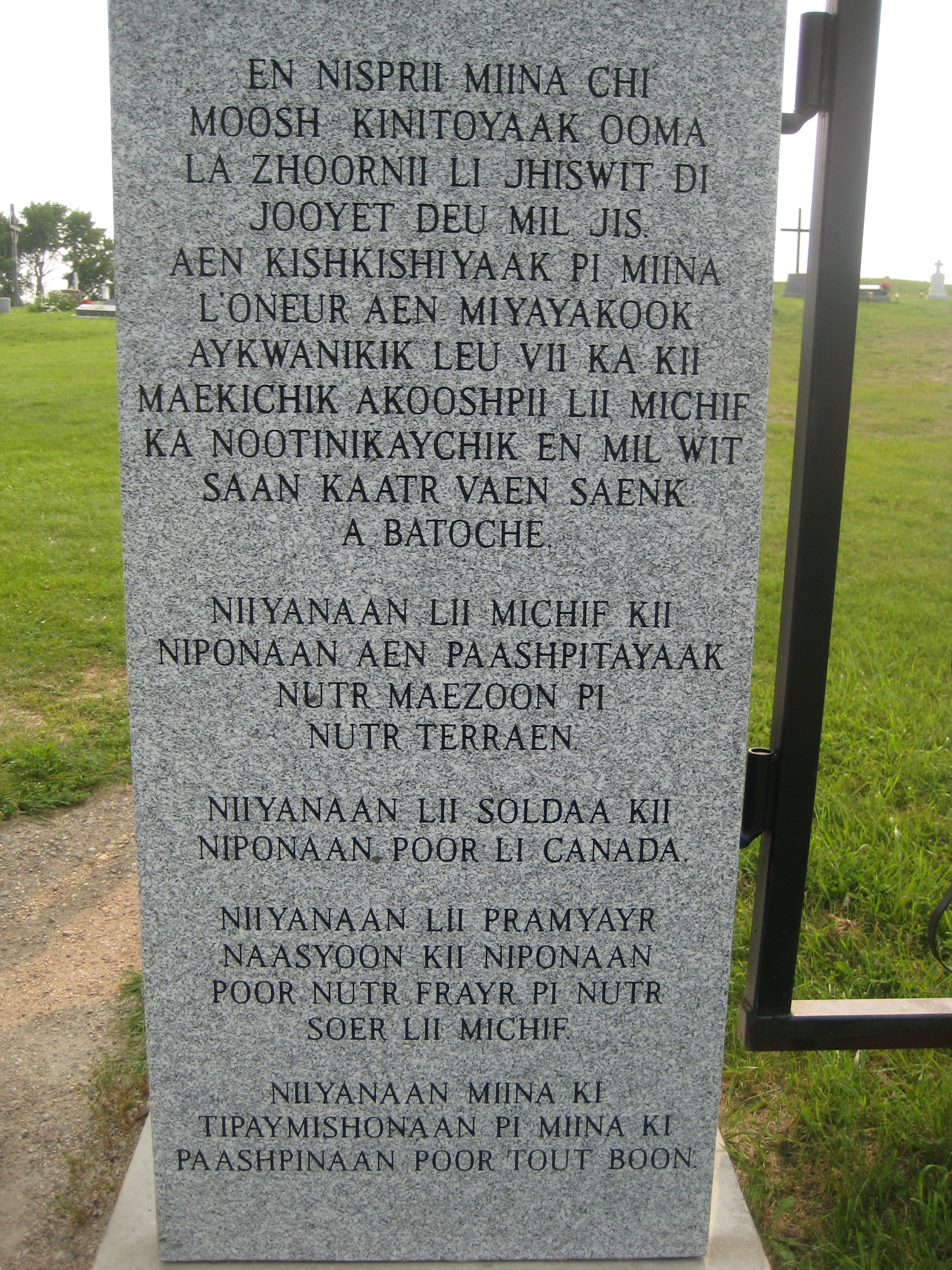
An example of Michif on an engraving in Batoche, Saskatchewan

There were four founding partners who oversaw the website's development and launch, including the First Peoples' Cultural Council, Eastern Michigan University, University of Hawaiʻi at Mānoa Department of Linguistics and Google.org. Today, it is primarily led by two of its founding partners, First Peoples' Cultural Council and University of Hawai‘i at Mānoa in coordination with the Governance Council.

== Project aim ==
The goals of the ELP are to foster exchange of information related to at-risk languages and accelerate endangered language research and documentation, to support communities engaged in protecting or revitalizing their languages. Users of the website play an active role in putting their languages online by submitting information or samples in the form of text, audio, links or video files. Once uploaded to the website, users can tag their submissions by resource category to ensure they are easily searchable. Current resource categories include:

1. Language Research and Linguistics
2. Language Revitalization
3. Language Materials
4. Language Education
5. Language Advocacy and Awareness
6. Language, Culture and Art
7. Language and Technology
8. Media

Languages included on the website and the information displayed about them are provided by the Catalogue of Endangered Languages (ELCat), developed by the linguistics departments at the University of Hawaiʻi at Mānoa and Eastern Michigan University. The catalogue's goal is to continuously improve. While the catalogue began with existing publications, the ELP sought out experts to fill in incomplete entries and correct any mistakes. Users that are knowledgeable about a specific language that is appropriate for the ELCat are encouraged to submit information pertaining to the improvement or submission of a particular language entry. The organization's website also offers an interactive map to present the origin for these languages around the world.

== Project's success and findings ==
As of 2020, the ELP has catalogued over 3000 endangered languages in its ELCat covering 180 countries/territories throughout the world. Some of these languages include Nubi, Irish, Orok, Welsh, Swedish Sign Language, and Boruca. There are 360 endangered languages catalogued in Australia, alone. The ELP states that "over 40 percent of the approximately 7,000 languages worldwide are in danger of becoming extinct."

In 2018, members of the ELCat team published a book about the project, titled Cataloguing the World's Endangered Languages.

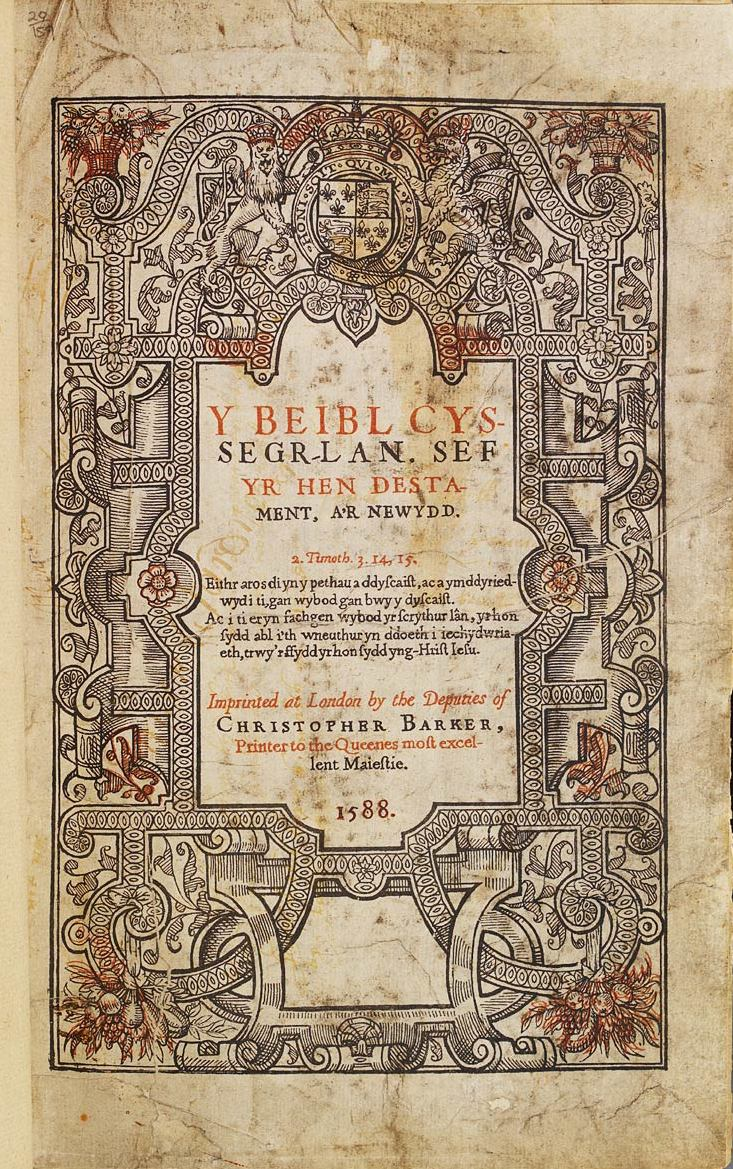
The First Welsh Bible from 1588

== Background and personnel ==
=== Leadership and organization hierarchy ===
A select group of invited professionals make up the Governance Council and Advisory Committee that oversee the organization. The Governance Council currently has eleven members, including Lyle Campbell and Oliver Loode, with a wide range of experience and employment, including language research groups, universities, and Google.

=== Governance Council ===
The active Governance Council has delegates from the United States, Canada, Australia, Estonia, Cameroon and the Netherlands. It is responsible for management of the website, oversight of outreach efforts and long-term planning for the project.

=== Partnerships ===
In addition to the governing organizations listed above, a global coalition of organizations working to strengthen and preserve endangered languages is forming through the website. This group is known as the Alliance for Linguistic Diversity. This group partners with Google to run the Endangered Languages Project.

=== Personnel ===
ELP currently has two full-time staff, four part-time Language Revitalization Mentors, and four interns. The current ELP staff and interns are from the US, Cameroon, Canada, China, India, Ireland, Kenya, Mexico, and Peru.
