= Limba language =

Niger-Congo language of Sierra Leone and Guinea

Limba
- Yimba
- Native to: Sierra Leone, Guinea
- Native speakers: (520,000 cited 1993-2019)
- Language family: Niger–Congo?: Atlantic–Congo; Limba
- Dialects: East Limba; West–Central Limba

Language codes
- ISO 639-3: Either: lia – West–Central lma – East
- Glottolog: limb1267

The Limba language, Hulimba, is a Niger–Congo language of Sierra Leone and Guinea. It is not closely related to other languages and appears to form its own branch of the Atlantic–Congo family. Dialects include Tonko, Sela, Kamuke (or Ke), Wara-wara, Keleng, Biriwa, and Safroko. The eastern variety, spoken primarily in Guinea, is quite distinct. Limba has a system of noun classes, marked by an old, eroded set of prefixes augmented by a newer set of enclitics.

== Distribution ==
Ethnologue lists the following two varieties of Limba, spoken in Guinea and Sierra Leone.

East Limba is spoken in Ouré-Kaba, Guinea.

West-Central Limba is spoken in northern Sierra Leone. It is spoken in the Little Scarcies River area in east Bombali District and northeast Kambia District, as well as north of Makeni.

== Phonology ==
Like neighboring Temne, Limba has an unusual contrast among its consonants. It distinguishes dental and alveolar, but the dental consonants are apical and the alveolar consonants are laminal, the opposite of the general pattern.

=== Consonants ===
		Labial	Dental	Alveolar	Palatal	Velar	Labio- velar	Glottal
Plosive	voiceless	p	t̪	t		k		
Plosive	voiced	b		d		(ɡ)	ɡ͡b	
Nasal		m		n		ŋ		
Fricative		(f)		s				h
Approximant				l	j		w	
Trill				r				

- Sounds /f/ and /ɡ/ are heard across dialects.

=== Vowels ===
	Front	Central	Back
High	i		u
High-mid	e		o
Low-mid	ɛ		ɔ
Low		a	

== Grammar ==
=== Noun classes ===
Noun classes are distinguished by the form of the definite article (class particle) which follows the noun, and sometimes also by a prefix. Roughly, the following classes can be deduced from the examples given by Mary Lane Clarke:

A. Person class

- Examples:
- Wukọnọ wo - a Kono person;
- sapiri wo - crowbar;
- kaň wo - the sun

Definite article (follows the noun): wo; pronoun ("he, she, it" as subject): wunde, wun

B. People class

- Examples:
- Bikọnọ be - Kono people;
- sapiriň be - crowbars;
- bia be - people, ancestors

Definite article: be; pronoun: bende, ben

C. Language class

- Examples:
- Hukọnọ ha - the Kono language;
- hutori ha - toe

Definite article: ha; pronoun: -?- (presumably this is neuter according to class, and so on through the neuter classes)

D. Country class

- Examples:
- Kakọnọ ka - Konoland

Definite article: ka

E. Bodkins class

- Examples:
- tatọli ta - bodkins;
- tatori ta - toe

Definite article: ta

F. Cascade class

- Examples:
- kutintọ ko - cascade;
- kekeň ko - country;
- kutiň ko - dog

Definite article: ko

G. Dogs class, plurals of F.

- Examples:
- ňatintọ ňa - cascades;
- ňakeň ňa - countries
- ňatiň ňa - dogs

Definite article: ňa

H. Arrival class

- Examples:
- matebeň ma - calm (noun);
- matalaň ma - arrival;
- masandiň ma - needle

Definite article: ma

I. Needles class, plurals of H.

- Examples:
- masandi ma - needles;
- matubucuciň ma - signs;
- mendeň ma - days, sleeps

Definite article: ma

J. Yam class

- Examples:
- ndamba ki - yam;
- nbēn ki (the b is a "smothered b") - bracelet;
- nkala ki - vine

Definite article: ki

K. Bracelets class, plurals of J.

- Examples:
- ndambeň ki - yams;
- nbēni ki ("smothered b" as above) - bracelets;
- nbuliň ki (also with "smothered b") - windpipes

Definite article: ki

L. Meat class

- Examples:
- piňkari ba - gun, musket;
- bọňa ba (bọňa has "smothered b", as above) - path, way;
- bara ba - meat, flesh

Definite article: ba

M. Boxes class, plurals of L.

- Examples:
- piňkariň ba - guns, muskets;
- bọňeň ba (bọňeň also has "smothered b") - paths, ways;
- kankaren ba - boxes, trunks

Definite article: ba

N. Yarn class

- Examples:
- mulufu mu - woof, yarn;
- muceňi mu - suffering;
- mufukeki mu - fan

Definite article: mu

O. Waves class

- Examples:
- muňkuliň mu - waves;
- mudọňiň mu - habitations

Definite article: mu

P. Kusini-fruits class

- Examples:
- busini bu - fruits of the kusini tree

Definite article: bu

Q. A class with definite article wu

- Examples: - ? -

Other nouns, including nouns of quantity, etc., take no article. It may be that they are classless:

- Examples:
- Alukorana - the Qur'an (Arabic);
- disa - fringe, shawl;
- duba - ink (from Mandingo);
- kameci - late, brown rice
