= Temne language =

Language spoken in Sierra Leone

Temne
- KʌThemnɛ
- Native to: Sierra Leone, Guinea
- Region: Northern Sierra Leone
- Ethnicity: Temne
- Speakers: L1: 2.0 million (2021); L2: 240,000 (1981)
- Language family: Niger–Congo?: Atlantic–Congo; Mel; Temne–Baga; Temne
- Writing system: Latin

Language codes
- ISO 639-2: tem
- ISO 639-3: tem
- Glottolog: timn1235

Temne
- Person: a-temne
- Language: ka-temne

Temne (also Themne, Timne; IPA: [t̪emnɛ]) is a language of the Mel branch of the Niger–Congo language family, spoken by the Temne people. Temne speakers live mostly in the Northern Province and Western Area, Sierra Leone. Temne people can be found in a number of other West African countries as well, including Guinea. Some Temnes have also migrated beyond West Africa seeking educational and professional opportunities, especially in Great Britain, and the United States.

== Phonology ==
Temne is a tonal language. Among consonants, Temne distinguishes dental and alveolar, but, unusually, the dental consonants are apical and the alveolar consonants are laminal (and slightly affricated), the opposite of the general pattern, though one found also in the nearby language Limba.

=== Consonants ===
Consonants
		Labial	Dental	Alveolar	Palatal	Velar	Glottal
Plosive	voiceless	p	t̪	t		k	
Plosive	voiced	b		d		gb	
Fricative		f		s	ʃ		h
Affricate					tʃ		
Nasal		m		n		ŋ	
Trill				r			
Lateral				l			
Approximant		w			j		

=== Vowels ===
Temne vowel chart

Vowels
	Front	Mid	Back
Close	i		u
Close-mid	e	ɘ	o
Open-mid	ɛ	ɜ	ɔ
Open		a	

==== Tones ====
Temne has two tones: high and low.

== Writing ==
The Temne alphabet uses the following letters and digraphs:

a	ʌ	b	d	e	ɛ	ə	f	gb	h	i	k	kp	l	m	n	ŋ	o	ɔ	p	r	s	t	th	u	w
A	Ʌ	B	D	E	Ɛ	Ə	F	Gb	H	I	K	Kp	L	M	N	Ŋ	O	Ɔ	P	R	S	T	Th	U	W

Ȧȧ may be used instead of Ʌʌ.

== Oral literature ==
In 1861, C. F. Schlenker, a missionary of the Church Missionary Society, published a collection of Temne fables and proverbs in Temne with a facing-text English translation. Schlenker's source was a Temne man living in Port Loko in the late 1840s; Schlenker explains that he was an old man already at that time. The book also contains some of Schlenker's translations from the Bible into Temne.

In 1916 Northcote Thomas published his Anthropological Report on Sierra Leone; Part 2 contains a Temne-English dictionary and Part 3 contains a grammar of Temne plus 27 stories told in Temne with interlinear English translation. Many of the stories are about the trickster spider, called panis in Temne; the trickster spider is a popular character in the Temne, Vai, Mende, and Limba storytelling traditions of Sierra Leone. In addition, Thomas's Specimens of Languages from Sierra Leone contains tables comparing Temne vocabulary to Kissi and other related languages.

== Bibliography ==
- Bai-Sharka, Abou (1986). Temne names and proverbs. Stories and songs from Sierra Leone. Vol. 19. Freetown: People's Educational Association of Sierra Leone. LCCN 91107781. OCLC 18356374. OL 1583057M.
- Kamarah, Sheikh Umarr (2007). A descriptive grammar of KʌThemnɛ (Temne). Munich: Lincom Europa.
- Turay, Abdul Karim (1989). Temne stories. Köln: Rüdiger Köppe. ISBN 9783927620766.
- Wilson, W.A.A. (1961). An outline of the Temne language. London: SOAS, University of London. OCLC 1848657.
- Yillah, M. Sorie (1992). Temne phonology and morphology (Thesis). New York: City University of New York.
