= Sherbro language =

Endangered Mel language of Sierra Leone

Sherbro
- Southern Bullom
- Native to: Sierra Leone
- Region: coast of Sierra Leone and Sherbro Island
- Ethnicity: Sherbro people
- Native speakers: 210,000 (2019)
- Language family: Niger–Congo?: Atlantic–Congo; Mel; Bullom–Kissi; Bullom; Southern; Sherbro

Language codes
- ISO 639-3: bun
- Glottolog: sher1258
- Map of ethnic and linguistic groups in Sierra Leone

The Sherbro language (also known as Southern Bullom, Shiba, Amampa, Mampa, and Mampwa) is an endangered language of Sierra Leone. It belongs to the Mel branch of the Niger–Congo language family. While Sherbro has more speakers than the other Bullom languages, its use is declining among the Sherbro people, in favor of Krio and English.

The first recorded publication in Sherbro is a selection of seven parables from Matthew and Luke in the New Testament. This was translated by James Schön of the Church Missionary Society (CMS) and published in 1839.
