= Kissi language =

Mel language spoken in West Africa

Kissi
- Native to: Guinea, Liberia, Sierra Leone
- Ethnicity: Kissi people
- Native speakers: 910,000 (2017–2020)
- Language family: Niger–Congo?: Atlantic–Congo; Mel; Bullom–Kissi; Kissi
- Dialects: Luangkori; Tengia; Warn; Liaro; Kama; Teng; Tung
- Writing system: Latin

Language codes
- ISO 639-3: Either: kss – Southern Kissi kqs – Northern Kissi
- Glottolog: kiss1245
- Linguasphere: (Kisi, incl. 94-BAB-aa Kisi-N. & 94-BAB-ab Kisi-S.) 94-BAB-a (Kisi, incl. 94-BAB-aa Kisi-N. & 94-BAB-ab Kisi-S.)

Kissi (also Kisi or Kisiei) is a Mel language of West Africa, There are two dialects, northern and southern, and both are tonal languages. The northern dialect (kisiduei) is spoken in Guinea and in Sierra Leone. The southern dialect (kpekeduei) is spoken in Liberia and Sierra Leone. The two dialects are notably different, but are closely related.

In Guinea, the main places Kissi is spoken are the cities of Kissidougou and Guéckédou and their préfectures.

== Phonology ==
=== Vowels ===
	Front	Back
Close	i	u
Close-mid	e	o
Open-mid	ɛ	ɔ
Open	a	

/o, e/ can also approximate to the sounds [ɪ, ʊ].

=== Consonants ===
		Labial	Alveolar	Palatal	Velar	Labial-velar	Glottal
Stop	voiceless	p	t		k	kp	
Stop	voiced/imp.	ɓ	ɗ			(gb)	
Stop	prenasalized	ᵐb	ⁿd	(ᶮɟ)	ᵑɡ	ᵑᵐɡ͡b	
Affricate				t͡ʃ			
Fricative		f	s				h
Nasal		m	n	ɲ	ŋ		
Approximant			l	j		w	

Kissidougou dialects preserve a distinction between /r/ and /l/ phonemes that have been merged as allophones in dialects south of Guéckédou. For instance, la huŋ means exactly the same as ra huŋ. Also, "thank you" is realized as barika around Kissidougou and balika south of Guéckédou. [r] is considered an allophone of /l/ in Kissidougou.

/w/ can also have an allophone of [v] when preceding front vowel sounds.

The voiced labial-velar stop /gb/ occurs only in onomatopoeic phrases, and medial gb can be regarded as an allophone of its voiceless counterpart.

- gbaala 'outdoor kitchen'
- Gbaŋgbaŋ (a river in Kissidougou)
- gbɛŋgbɔ 'stool'
- maagbana 'city taxi'

=== Tone ===
Kissi has four tones: two register and two contour. The two register tones are level and high, and the two contour tones are a rising mid tone and a falling high tone. Kissi also has an extra-high tone, but occurs only sparingly, functioning in only a few grammatical contexts.

== Grammar (northern Kissi) ==
=== Pronouns ===
Kissi pronoun	Pronunciation	English pronoun	Kissi example	English translation
y	/i/	I	y tyo kɔlaŋ loŋ.	I'm going there.
a	/a/	you	a tyo kɔlaŋ loŋ.	You're going there.
o	/o/	he/she	o tyo kɔlaŋ loŋ.	He's going there.
n	/n/	we	n tyo kɔlaŋ loŋ.	We're going there.
la	/la/	you (plural)	la tyo kɔlaŋ loŋ.	You're going there.
aa	/aː/	they	aa tyo kɔlaŋ loŋ.	They're going there.

As can already be seen from these examples, verbs are not conjugated like English verbs, but they are inflected by tone.

Kissi pronoun	Pronunciation	English pronoun	Kissi example	English translation
ya	/ja/	me	o tyo ya lɔ. yɔŋgu ya ho. / k'ya ho.	He's going to beat me. Give me that.
nɔm	/nɔm/	you	y tyo nɔm lɔ.	I'm going to beat you.
ndu	/ndu/	him/her	y tyo ndu lɔ. o tyo ndu pilɛ lɔ.	I'm going to beat him / her. He's going to beat himself.
na	/na/	us	o tyo na lɔ.	He's going to beat us.
nia	/nia/	you (plural)	o tyo nia lɔ.	He's going to beat you.
ndaa	/ndaː/	them	o tyo ndaa lɔ.	He's going to beat them.

=== Articles ===
Definite and indefinite articles do not exist in Kissi, so muɛi means "the knife" as well as "a knife". If an object has to be defined (because there are more than one, for example), "this" is used:

example: muɛi coŋ - this knife

If that is not exact enough, an object is described using adjectives.

yɔŋgu ya muɛi. / k'ya muɛi. - Give me a/the knife.

yɔŋgu ya muɛi bɛndɛi. / k'ya muɛi bɛndɛi. - Give me the big knife.
