= List of political parties in Bolivia =

This article lists political parties in Bolivia.

Bolivia has a multi-party system, with numerous parties.

== Current parties ==
=== Congressional parties ===
The following parties and alliances are represented in the Plurinational Legislative Assembly:

| Party | | | Position | Est.. | Presidential vote | | Assembly representation | | Governors |
| Logo | Name | Abbr. | Position | Est.. | First round | Second round | Deputies | Senators | Governors |
|---|---|---|---|---|---|---|---|---|---|
| | Christian Democratic Party; Partido Demócrata Cristiano | PDC | Centre to centre-right | 1954 | 1,717,432 (32.06%) | | 49 / 130 | 16 / 36 | 0 / 9 |
| | Libre – Liberty and Democracy; Libre – Libertad y Democracia | LIBRE | Right-wing to Far-Right | 2024 | 1,430,176 (26.70%) | | 39 / 130 | 12 / 36 | 2 / 9 |
| | Unity Bloc; Bloque de Unidad | UNIDAD | Centre-right to right-wing | 2024 | 1,054,568 (16.69%) | —N/a | 26 / 130 | 7 / 36 | 1 / 9 |
| | Popular Alliance; Alianza Popular | AP | Centre-left to left-wing | 2025 | 456,002 (8.51%) | —N/a | 8 / 130 | 0 / 36 | 0 / 9 |
| | Autonomy for Bolivia – Súmate; Autonomía Para Bolivia – Súmate | APB Súmate | Centre-right | 2020 | 361,640 (6.75%) | —N/a | 5 / 130 | 1 / 36 | 0 / 9 |
| | Movement for Socialism; Movimiento al Socialismo | MAS-IPSP | Left-wing to far-left | 1999 | 169,887 (3.17%) | —N/a | 2 / 130 | 0 / 36 | 1 / 9 |

=== National parties ===
Nine groups are registered with the Supreme Electoral Tribunal as political organizations of national scope. Of these, only one, the Social Democratic Movement, is a civic group; the remaining eight are all political parties.

| Party | | Year Founded | Ideology |
|---|---|---|---|
| Autonomy for Bolivia – Súmate | Autonomía Para Bolivia – Súmate (APB Súmate) | 2020 | Conservatism |
| Bolivian National Action Party | Partido de Acción Nacional Boliviano (PAN-BOL) | 2016 | Syncretic politics |
| Christian Democratic Party | Partido Demócrata Cristiano (PDC) | 1954 | Christian democracy |
| Front for Victory (Bolivia) | Frente Para la Victoria (FPV) | 2008 | Left-wing Nationalism |
| Movement for Socialism | Movimiento al Socialismo (MAS-IPSP) | 1997 | Bolivarianism; Socialism of the 21st Century |
| National Renewal Movement | Movimiento de Renovación Nacional (MORENA) | 2025 | Socialism of the 21st Century |
| National Unity Front | Frente de Unidad Nacional (UN) | 2003 | Neoliberalism |
| Nationalist Democratic Action | Acción Democrática Nacionalista (ADN) | 1979 | Conservatism |
| New Patriotic Generation | Nueva Generación Patriótica (NGP) | 2024 | Social liberalism |
| Revolutionary Left Front | Frente Revolucionario de Izquierda (FRI) | 1979 | Progressivism |
| Revolutionary Nationalist Movement | Movimiento Nacionalista Revolucionario (MNR) | 1942 | Liberal conservatism Revolutionary nationalism |
| Solidarity Civic Unity | Unidad Cívica Solidaridad (UCS) | 1989 | Social conservatism |
| Third System Movement | Movimiento Tercer Sistema (MTS) | 2017 | Third Way |

One group is not registered with the Supreme Electoral Tribunal.

| Party | | Year Founded | Ideology |
|---|---|---|---|
| EVO People | EVO Pueblo | 2025 | Socialism |

=== Subnational parties ===
The following are some of the major parties registered with the Supreme Electoral Tribunal as subnational organizations within one of the nine Departments of Bolivia:

| Party | | Department |
|---|---|---|
| We Are All Chuquisaca | Chuquisaca Somos Todos (CST) | Chuquisaca |
| Movement for Sovereignty | Movimiento por la Soberanía (MPS) | La Paz |
| Sovereignty and Liberty | Soberanía y Libertad (SOL.bo) | La Paz |
| Third System Movement | Movimiento Tercer Sistema (MTS) | La Paz |
| Jesús Lara | Jesús Lara | Cochabamba |
| Popular Organization Movement | Movimiento de Organización Popular | Potosí |
| United to Renew | Unidos para Renovar (UNIR) | Tarija |
| Popular Solidarity Alliance | Alianza Solidaria Popular (ASIP) | Santa Cruz |
| Security, Order and Liberty | Seguridad, Orden y Libertad (SOL) | Santa Cruz |
| Building Future | Construyendo Futuro | Beni |
| Autonomous Nationalities for Change and Revolutionary Empowerment (NACER) | Nacionalidades Autónomas por el Cambio y el Empoderamiento Revolucionario | Beni |
| Integration Column | Columna de Integracion (CI) | Pando |

== Dissolved parties ==
=== Twentieth Century ===
- Bolivian Democratic Union
- Eje Comunero

=== Parties that lost their registration in 2014 ===
- Fearless Movement (Movimiento Sin Miedo, MSM)

=== Parties that lost their registration in 2013 ===
- Popular Consensus (Consenso Popular, CP; accredited as a citizen grouping)

=== Parties that lost their registration in 2009 ===
- Social Democratic Power (Poder Democrático Social, PODEMOS)

=== Parties that lost their registration in 2006 ===
- Free Bolivia Movement (Movimiento Bolivia Libre, MBL)
- Progress Plan (Plan Progreso, PP)
- Workers Social Union of Bolivia (Unión Social de Trabajadores de Bolivia, USTB)
- Pachakuti Indigenous Movement (Movimiento Indígena Pachakuti, MIP)
- Agrarian Patriotic Front of Bolivia (Frente Patriótico Agropecuario de Bolivia, FREPAB)
- Revolutionary Left Movement – New Majority (Movimiento Izquierda Revolucionaria – Nueva Mayoría, MIR-NM)
- New Republican Force (Nueva Fuerza Republicana, NFR)

=== Parties that lost their registration in 2005 ===
- Patriotic Social Alliance (Alianza Social Patriótica, ASP)
- Institutional Vanguard Mariscal de Ayacucho (Vanguardia Institucional Mariscal de Ayacucho, VIMA)
- Bolivarian Movement (Movimiento Bolivariano, MOVIBOL)

=== Parties that lost their registration in 2002–2003 ===
- Conscience of Fatherland – Patriotic Movement (Conciencia de Patria Movimiento Patriótico, CONDEPA-MP)
- Bolivian Socialist Falange (Falange Socialista Boliviana, FSB)
- Democratic National Katarism (Katarismo Nacional Democrático, KND)
- Citizens' Movement for Change (Movimiento Ciudadano para el Cambio, MCC)
- Revolutionary Liberation Movement Túpac Katari (Movimiento Revolucionario Túpac Katari de Liberación, MRTKL)
- Communist Party of Bolivia (Partido Comunista de Bolivia, PCB)
- Young Force Party (Partido Fuerza Joven, PFJ)
- Socialist Party-1 (Partido Socialista-1, PS)
- Revolutionary Vanguard 9th April (Vanguardia Revolucionaria 9 de Abril, VR-9)

== See also ==
- Lists of political parties
- Liberalism in Bolivia
- Regional Federation of Mining Cooperatives of Huanuni
