= UDB =

UDB may refer to:

== Computing ==
- Universal Data Bank, the original name of UDB CORPORATION
- Universal Database, the original name of the IBM Db2 database
- Universal Desktop Box, a line of desktop computers originally named DEC Multia
- User database, for T9 predictive text
- Ultimate Doom Builder, the level/script editor for the first-person shooter Doom and its derivatives.
- Undo debugger, a form of Time travel debugging

== Politics ==
- Bolivian Democratic Union (Spanish: Unión Democrática Boliviana), a former right-wing political party in Bolivia
- Breton Democratic Union (Union Démocratique Bretonne), the main Breton autonomist political party
- Belgian Democratic Union (Union Démocratique Belge), a short-lived Belgian political party after the Second World War
- Unión del Barrio (Union of Neighbors)

== Other uses ==
- Dakar Bourguiba University (French: Université Dakar Bourguiba) in Dakar, Senegal
- Universidad Don Bosco, a university in El Salvador
- Urbancorp Development Bank, a subsidiary of Urban Bank, Philippines
- UDBapp, Ultimate Drill Book's mobile app designed for reading marching drill

== See also ==
- Uganda Development Bank Limited (UDBL), a development financial institution, owned by the Government of Uganda
- Uprava državne bezbednosti (UDBA), the secret police organization of the Socialist Federal Republic of Yugoslavia
