= Alioune =

Alioune is a masculine given name. Notable people with the surname include:

- Alioune Ba (footballer) (born 1989), French footballer
- Alioune Bâ (born 1959), Malian photographer
- Alioune Badará (born 1989), Senegalese footballer
- Alioune Badara Bèye (1945-2024), Senegalese civil servant, novelist, playwright, poet and publisher
- Alioune Diakhate (born 1994), Senegalese footballer
- Alioune Diouf (born 1966), Senegalese wrestler
- Alioune Diop (1910–1980), Senegalese writer and editor
- Alioune Dramé (c. 1921–1977), Guinean economist and politician
- Alioune Fall (born 1994), Senegalese footballer
- Alioune Gueye (born, 1987), Senegalese footballer
- Alioune Kébé (born 1984), Senegalese footballer
- Alioune Mbaye Nder (born 1969), Senegalese singer
- Alioune Ndour (born 1997), Senegalese footballer
- Alioune Sarr (1908–2001), Senegalese historian, author and politician
- Alioune Sene (born 1996), Senegalese-born French pole vaulters
- Alioune Sow (born 1936), Senegalese sprinter
- Alioune Touré (born 1978), French footballer
- Papa Alioune Diouf (born 1989), Senegalese footballer
- Papa Alioune Ndiaye (born 1990), Senegalese footballer

== See also ==
- Alioune Diop University of Bambey, University in the Diourbel region of west-central Senegal
