= List of universities in Senegal =

This is a list of universities in Senegal.

== Public universities ==
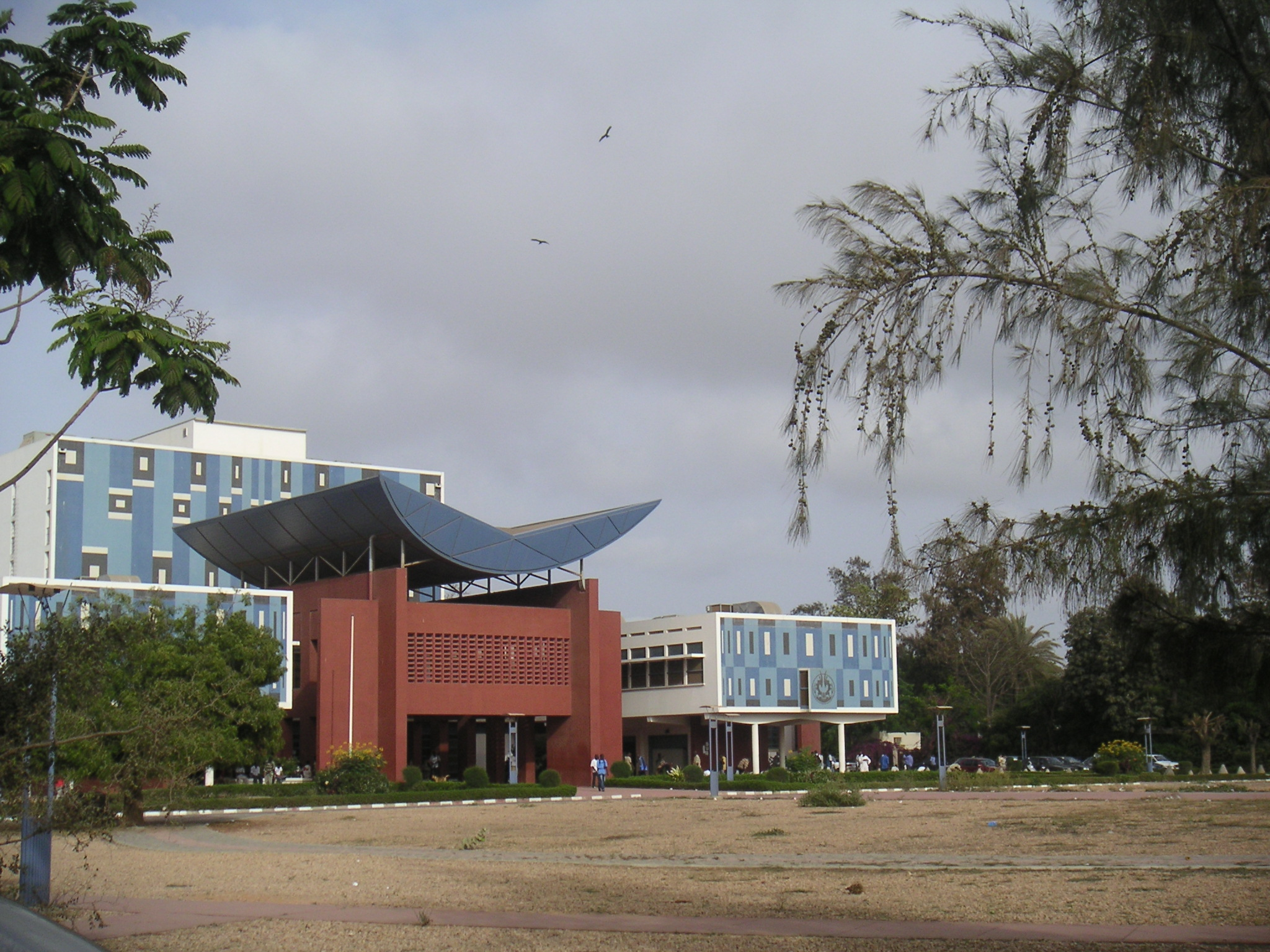
Founded before Senegal's independence, the Cheikh Anta Diop University at Dakar is the oldest in the country.

University	City	Founded
Alioune Diop University of Bambey	Bambey	2004 (opened 2007)
Cheikh Anta Diop University	Dakar	24 February 1957
Gaston Berger University	Saint-Louis	17 December 1990
Thies University	Thies	2007
Ziguinchor University	Ziguinchor	February 2007

== Private universities ==
- Amadou Hampaté Bâ University, Dakar
- Dakar Bourguiba University, Dakar
- Euromed Université, Dakar
- Suffolk University Dakar Campus, Dakar
- L'Université de l'Entreprise, Dakar
- Université du Sahel, Dakar
- Université Euro-Afrique, Dakar
- African Institute for Mathematical Sciences, Mbour
- Dakar American University of Science & Technology, Someone
