= Fama Diagne Sène =

Senegalese writer (born 1969)

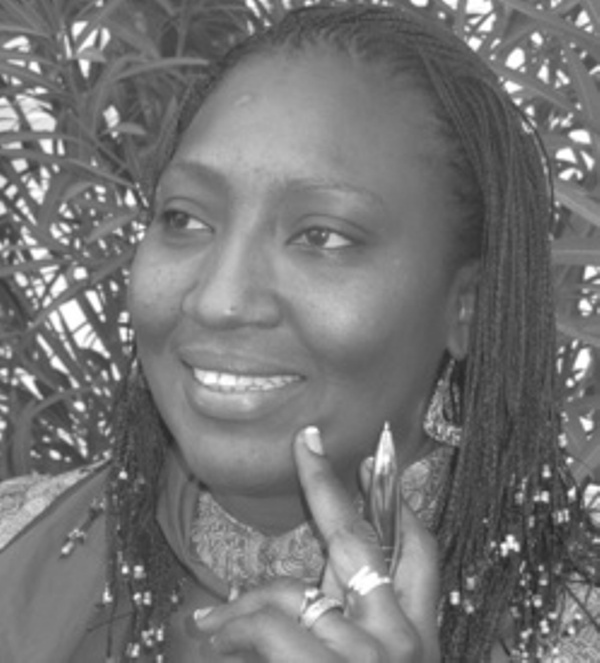
- Born: 1969
- Awards: National Order of the Lion
- Academic career
- Institutions: Alioune Diop University of Bambey

Fama Diagne Sène (born 1969, Thiès) is a Senegalese writer.

== Biography ==
Educated in Thiès, she became a teacher there. Ken Bugul listed her among "illustrious women" in Senegalese literature. In 1997, she won the presidential award for art and literature with Chant des ténèbres. Born to a Serer family, Fama's controversial play Mbilem ou le baobab du lion denounces Serer tradition and received great criticism from the Serer traditionalists of Senegal. The Mbilim (variation : Bilim) is a religious festival in the Serer calendar, celebrated once a year and is equivalent to the new year. In pre-colonial times, right until recently, some Serer griots were buried in the trunks of a baobab tree rather than buried in a pyramid tomb with all the regalia dictated by Serer religion. Tomb burial and mummification were always given to the Serer nobility, but some Serer griots were not buried this way. In this play, she criticises this tradition and came head on with the Serer priestly class.

== Works ==
- Le chant des ténèbres [The Song of Darkness]. Dakar: Les Nouvelles Editions Africaines du Sénégal, 1997 (154p.). ISBN 2-7236-1109-4. Novel.(Award-winner)
- Humanité. Editions Maguilen et Editions Damel, Dakar et Genève, n.d. [2002] (30p.). Poetry.
- La momie d'Almamya [The mummy of Almamya]. Dakar: Les Nouvelles Editions Africaines du Sénégal, 2004. (264p.). ISBN 2-7236-1489-1. Novel.

== Honours ==
Diagne Sène has been awarded the National Order of the Lion for her services to the Nation in her role as director of the library at Alioune Diop University of Bambey.
