= Djibril Sonko =

Senegalese politician

Mayor of Ziguinchor
- Incumbent
- Assumed office 27 June 2024
- Preceded by: Ousmane Sonko

Personal details
- Born: Ziguinchor, Senegal
- Party: PASTEF (2014–present)
- Education: Cheikh Anta Diop University
- Occupation: Politician; tax official

Djibril Sonko is a Senegalese politician who has served as mayor of Ziguinchor since 2024.

== Early life and education ==
Sonko was born in Ziguinchor. He attended Cheikh Anta Diop University (UCAD) in Dakar where he was the head of the International Association of Economics Students and the Student Association of the Faculty of Economics and Management. He received a diploma from the university in international economics which he used to teach public procurement at both Ziguinchor University and UCAD itself. For 15 years he worked as a treasury inspector and municipal tax collector in Kébémer and Gossas.

== Political career ==
Sonko is a founding member of PASTEF and led the party in the Ziguinchor department. As 2nd deputy mayor of Ziguinchor, he was one of four candidates seeking to succeed outgoing mayor Ousmane Sonko following his appointment as prime minister of Senegal and resignation as mayor on 6 May 2024. The other three candidates being 1st deputy and interim mayor Aïda Bodian, 4th deputy mayor, Alassane Diédhiou, and 6th deputy mayor, Bassirou Coly. Sonko was elected as mayor unanimously by the 77 members of the city council present in the town hall on 27 June 2024. According to the APS, this was a symbolic vote. Mouhamed Lamine Dia, the former chief of staff of Abdoulaye Baldé, filed a complaint calling for Sonko's dismissal as mayor stating that he was ineligible according to him as three months had not passed between Sonko's resignation as a municipal tax collector and his election as mayor. In a September 2025 interview, Sonko denied any involvement in the alleged mismanagement of 27 to 33 million CFA francs at the town hall and accused activists, such as Amadou Tom Mbodj, of exaggerating the controversy.
