= EVO Pueblo =

Unregistered political party in Bolivia

We Are Returning to Obeying the People Estamos Volviendo Obedeciendo al Pueblo
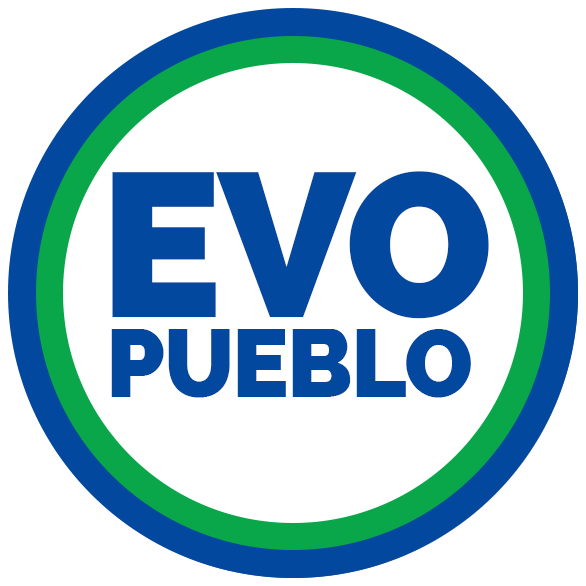
- Abbreviation: EVO Pueblo
- Leader: Evo Morales
- Founder: Evo Morales
- Founded: 31 March 2025; 15 months ago
- Split from: Movement for Socialism
- Ideology: Evoism; Left-wing populism Plurinationalism
- Political position: Left-wing to far-left
- International affiliation: Sovintern
- Colors: White; Green; Blue
- Senate: 0 / 36
- Deputies: 0 / 130
- Governorships: 0 / 9
- Mayors: 0 / 337
- Andean Parliament: 0 / 5

Party flag

Website
- evopueblo.org

We Are Returning to Obeying the People (Spanish: Estamos Volviendo Obedeciendo al Pueblo), abbreviated and commonly known as EVO Pueblo, is an unregistered Bolivian political party. It was established in March 2025 by former Bolivian president Evo Morales.

== History ==
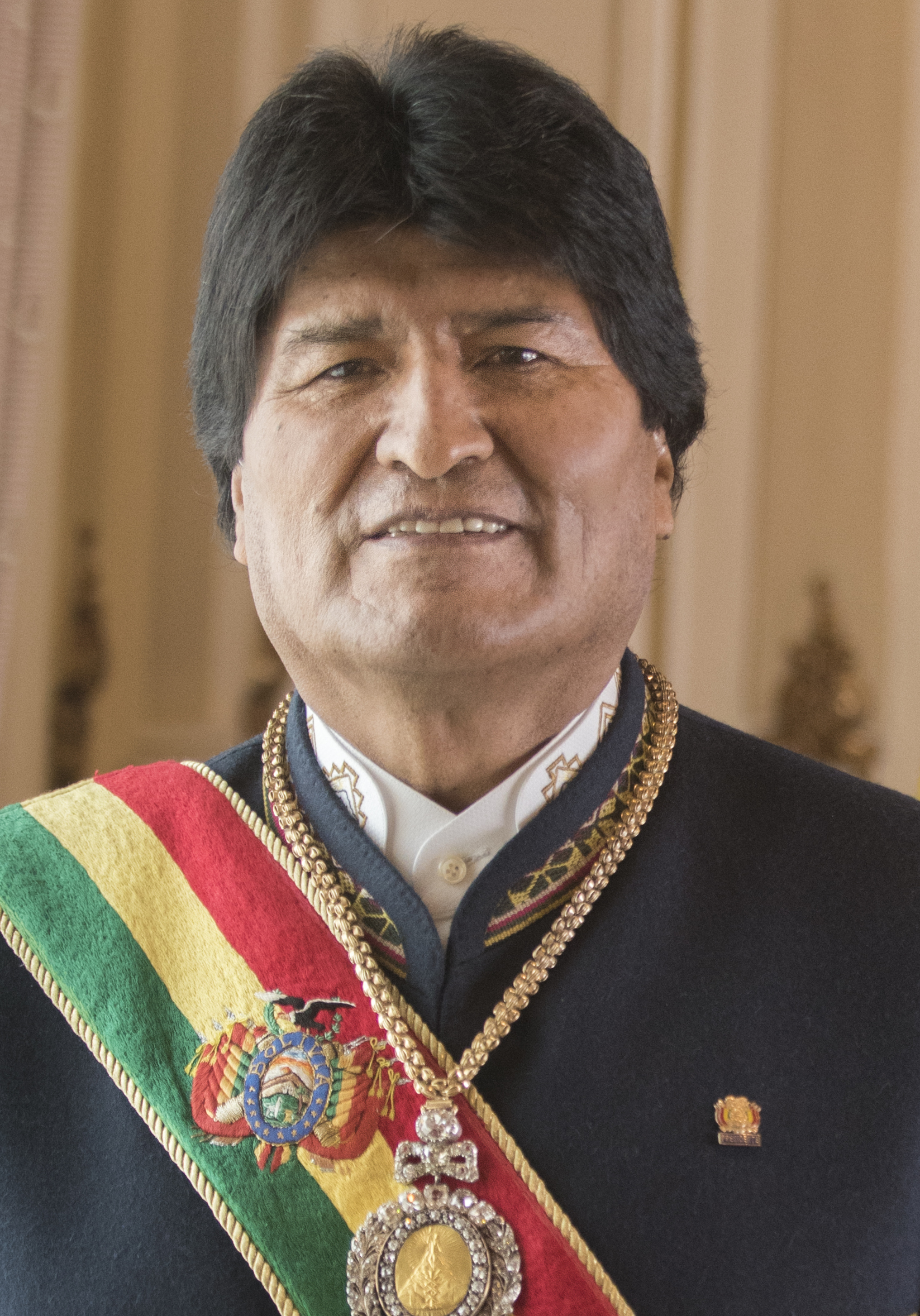
Evo Morales in 2018

Ahead of the 2025 Bolivian general election, former president Evo Morales (in office from 2006 to 2019) expressed interest in being re-elected to the presidency. On 8 November 2024, the Plurinational Constitutional Tribunal banned Morales from running for president, ruling that he could not exceed the constitutional two-term limit for the presidency. Despite the ban, on 20 February 2025, Morales announced that he would run for president in the August 2025 general election. He left the Movement for Socialism (MAS) political party that he had led for 30 years and stated that he would run for president with the Front for Victory (FPV). He justified his bid by arguing that a loophole in the constitution of Bolivia allowed him to run for a fourth presidential term. (Note: Morales had previously been elected to a fourth term in the 2019 Bolivian general election but before he began the term; he resigned shortly after the election amidst national protests.)

In December 2024, Morales stated that he would establish a political party to contest the 2025 general election. On 31 March 2025, Morales and hundreds of his supporters announced the establishment of a new political party: We Are Returning to Obeying the People (Estamos Volviendo Obedeciendo al Pueblo, abbreviated EVO Pueblo). Morales stated that the party would immediately seek registration with the Plurinational Electoral Organ to be eligible to participate in the 2025 general election. According to the Law of Political Organizations, EVO Pueblo needs to have at least 109,500 members to be registered to participate in elections; at the time of EVO Pueblo's establishment, it had two weeks after to meet the 120 day deadline to register a political party ahead of the August 2025 election. Due to this time restriction, Morales intended to run for president with the FPV.

Morales led EVO Pueblo's first rally on 6 April 2025 in Lauca Ñ to establish how the party would select candidates for the Plurinational Legislative Assembly. He stated that EVO Pueblo would register its presidential and legislative candidates on 16 May 2025. The party declared Morales to be its "only candidate to the Presidency" ("único candidato a la Presidencia"). Morales offered former Bolivian president Eduardo Rodríguez Veltzé to be his vice presidential candidate, but Rodríguez declined the following day. On 9 April 2025, after the FPV announced that Morales would not be its candidate, EVO Pueblo stated that it would seek "other options" ("otras opciones") to get Morales registered as a presidential candidate.

== Symbology ==
At the announcement of the party's establishment, Morales stated that the party had "an acronym, colors of our flag, statutes, and a vision of the country" ("sigla, colores de nuestra bandera, estatutos y visión de país"). A party organizer explained the symbolism of the colors on the party's flag: white stands for "the fight for peace" ("la lucha por la paz"), green stands for "Mother Earth and nature ("la madre tierra y la naturaleza"), and blue stands for "the water, the sky, and the air we breath" ("el cielo y el aire que respiramos"). Members of the party are known as evistas.

=== Name controversy ===
The party's name, "EVO Pueblo", received criticism as it shares Morales' name. Left- and right-wing politicians criticized the party's name as being indications of a "cult of personality" ("culto a la personalidad") and "anti-democratic personalism" ("personalismo antidemocrático"). Former Bolivian president Jorge Quiroga critiqued the party as an "egocentric project" ("proyecto ególatra"). Morales clarified in a press conference that "EVO Pueblo" was an acronym for "We Are Returning to Obeying the People".

== See also ==
- List of political parties in Bolivia
