= Ahmadou Lamine Ndiaye =

Senegalese academic

Rector of the Gaston Berger University
- In office January 1990 – November 1999

Personal details
- Born: 20 May 1937 (age 89) Saint-Louis, Senegal
- Website: membres.multimania.fr/ahmadoulamine/

Ahmadou Lamine Ndiaye (born 20 May 1937) is a former professor of Veterinary Sciences from Senegal who has held many senior administrative positions in African educational institutions and organizations.

== Birth and education ==
Ahmadou Lamine Ndiaye was born on 20 May 1937 in Saint-Louis, Senegal. He attended the Lycée Faidherbe in Saint-Louis for his secondary education between 1950 and 1957. He studied at the Lycée Marcelin Berthelot de Saint-Maur-des-Fossés, France for a year, and then was admitted to the National Veterinary School of Lyon (Ecole Nationale Vétérinaire de Lyon), where he studied from 1958 to 1962. In 1963 he gained diplomas from the Faculty of Medicine of Lyon, the National Agronomic Institute of Paris and the Institute of Animal Husbandry and Veterinary Medicine in tropical countries.

== Teaching career ==
Ndiaye worked at the Animal Science Research Center at Dahra, Senegal from 1963 to 1967, while completing an internship at the National Center for Agricultural Research Jouy-en-Josas, France in the Genetics Section. In 1967 he became an assistant lecturer at the University of Dakar. In 1971 he became a trainee lecturer in food nutrition at the National Veterinary School of Alfort in France. In 1974 he became a fellow of this institute and a lecturer at the Inter-State School of Veterinary Sciences and Medicine of Dakar. From 1976 to 1986 he was the first African director of the school, part of Dakar's Cheikh Anta Diop University. In 1977 he was appointed a professor of animal nutrition, a position he held until 1988.

== Other appointments ==
Ndiaye was a staff adviser to the President of the Republic of Senegal from 1988 to 1990. In January 1990 he was appointed Rector of the Gaston Berger University of Saint-Louis, the second university in Senegal, holding this position until November 1999. He was then Minister and special adviser to the President of the Republic for a few months.

Ndiaye was a member of the Executive Council of the Association of African Universities from 1997 to 2005, and for a period served as President of this association. He was the first president of the African Regional Committee for monitoring the World Conference on Higher Education (2000–2001). In 2002 he became a member of the World Bank's Scientific Council for the reform of external training courses for higher education, and also Chairman of the Working Group for revitalization of the Institute of Natural Resources in Africa. Other positions held included member of the Academy of Sciences for the Developing World and founding member of the National Academy of Science and Technology of Senegal (ANSTS). In February 2011 Ndiaye was elected president of the ANSTS, replacing Professor Souleymane Niang who had recently died.

Ndiaye was appointed Chairman of the High Level Panel created in 2009 by the African Union to establish the Pan African University (PAU). The PAU is a network of universities across Africa that promotes post-graduate scientific education and research, mobility of students and teachers between institutions and standardization of qualifications, with five regional centers of excellence each focusing on a different area of science. On 28 February 2011 Ndiaye was appointed President of the African Academy of Sciences (AAS) based in Nairobi, Kenya, for a three-year term. He was the first francophone to hold this position since the AAS was founded in 1985. Ndiaye said he wanted to rejuvenate the AAS, and felt that conditions were favorable. He aimed to open up centers of excellence on the continent where French and English speakers could work on joint research programs.

== Work and recognition ==
Ndiaye has written over a hundred scientific articles, papers and reports, particularly in the areas of nutrition and higher education. He is also the author of more than thirty reports, such as one that UNESCO commissioned in 2009 on the Pan African University project. He is an Officer in the Order of Agricultural Merit of France, Officer of the National Order of Ivory Coast, Chevalier of the National Order of the Lion of Senegal and Grand Officer of the Order of Merit Senegal.
