= Ziguinchor =

City in Ziguinchor Region, Senegal

Ziguinchor Siggcoor زيغينكور
- City and commune
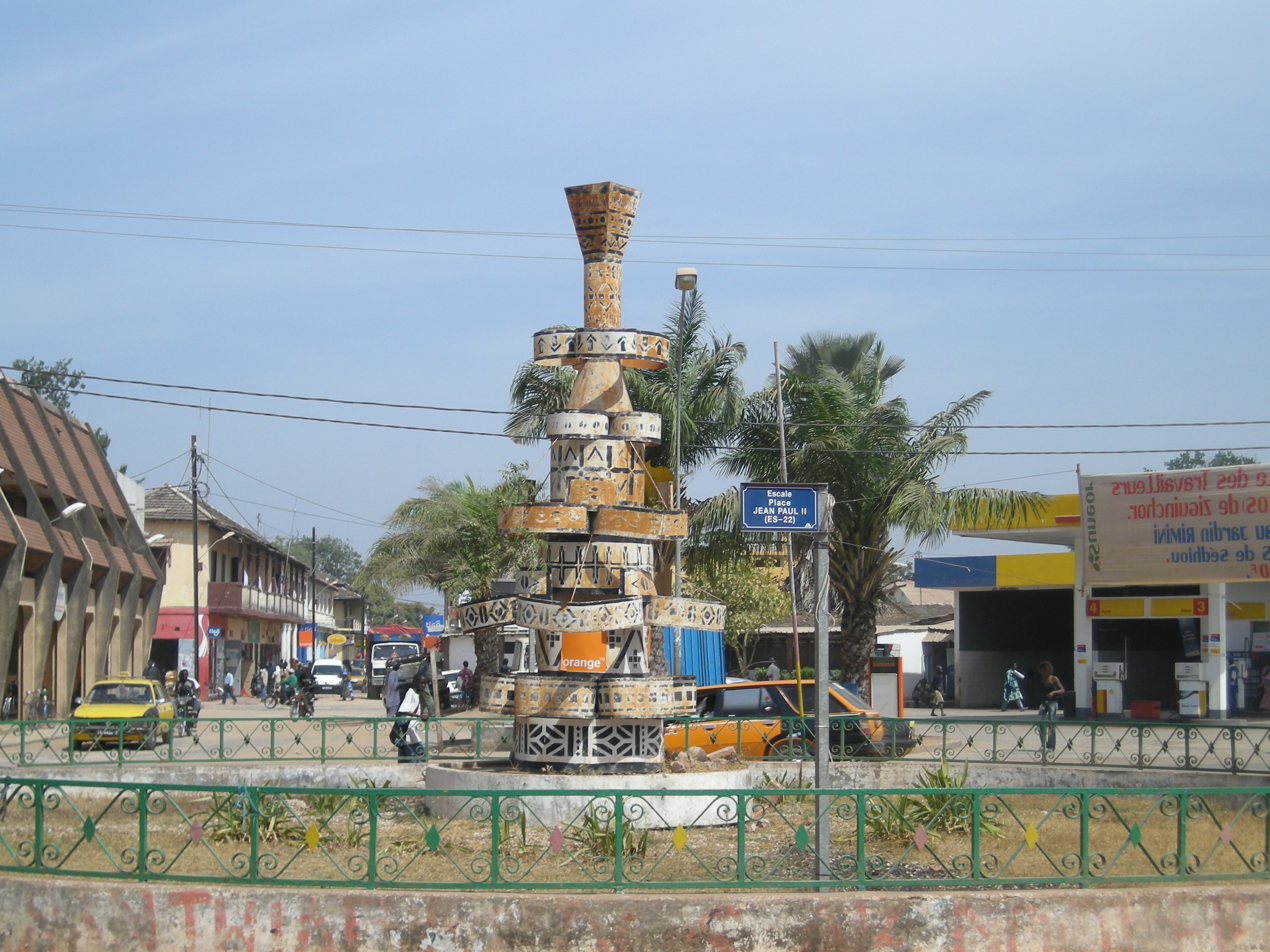
- Downtown of Ziguinchor

- Location within Senegal
- Coordinates (region:SN_type:city): 12°33′43″N 16°17′2″W
- Country: Senegal
- Region: Ziguinchor Region
- Departement: Ziguinchor

Government
  - Mayor: Djibril Sonko

Area
  - City and commune: 32.8 km^{2} (12.7 sq mi)
- Elevation: 12 m (39 ft)

Population (2023 census)
  - City and commune: 215,998
  - Density: 6,590/km^{2} (17,100/sq mi)
  - Metro: 274,563
- Time zone: UTC+0 (GMT)

Ziguinchor (French: [ziɡɛ̃ʃɔʁ]; Wolof: Siggcoor [siɡˑcɔːɾ]; Arabic: زيغينكور) is the capital of the Ziguinchor Region, and the chief town of the Casamance area of Senegal, lying at the mouth of the Casamance River. It has a population of 214,874 (2023 census). It is the eighth largest city of Senegal, but is nearly separated from the north of the country by the nation of The Gambia.

Unlike the semi-arid to arid north of Senegal, Ziguinchor has a tropical savanna climate, as it is under the influence of the West African Monsoon. It has an average annual accumulated rainfall of approximately 1,547 millimetres or 61 inches.

== Etymology ==
There are several competing etymologies for Ziguinchor's name. The best known comes from the time when Portuguese traders and explorers came to the region to form a trading post. It is derived from a Portuguese phrase, Cheguei e choram, "I came and they cry". The local people, seeing the Europeans, began crying, thinking they were about to be enslaved. Other scholars believe that the name likely predates the Portuguese arrival.

The earliest sources mention the Bainuk of Ezigichor. The term may come from the Bainuk language words "asi nin core," meaning "places to go are finished," relating to the end of the Bainuk migrations in their traditional history. It could also come from "ji gi cor," meaning "place of several fields."

== History ==
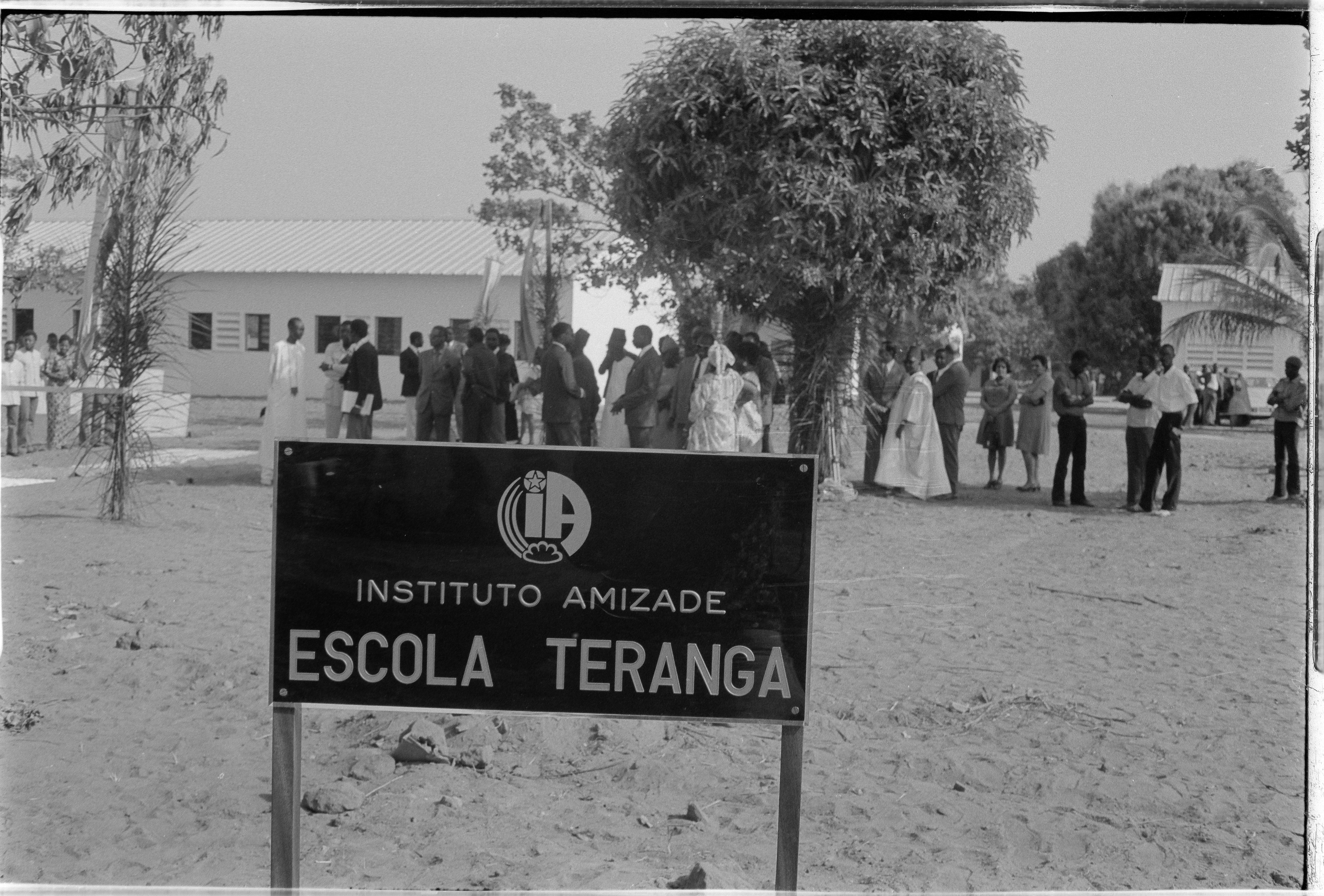
PAIGC Secondary School official opening in Ziguinchor, Senegal – 1974

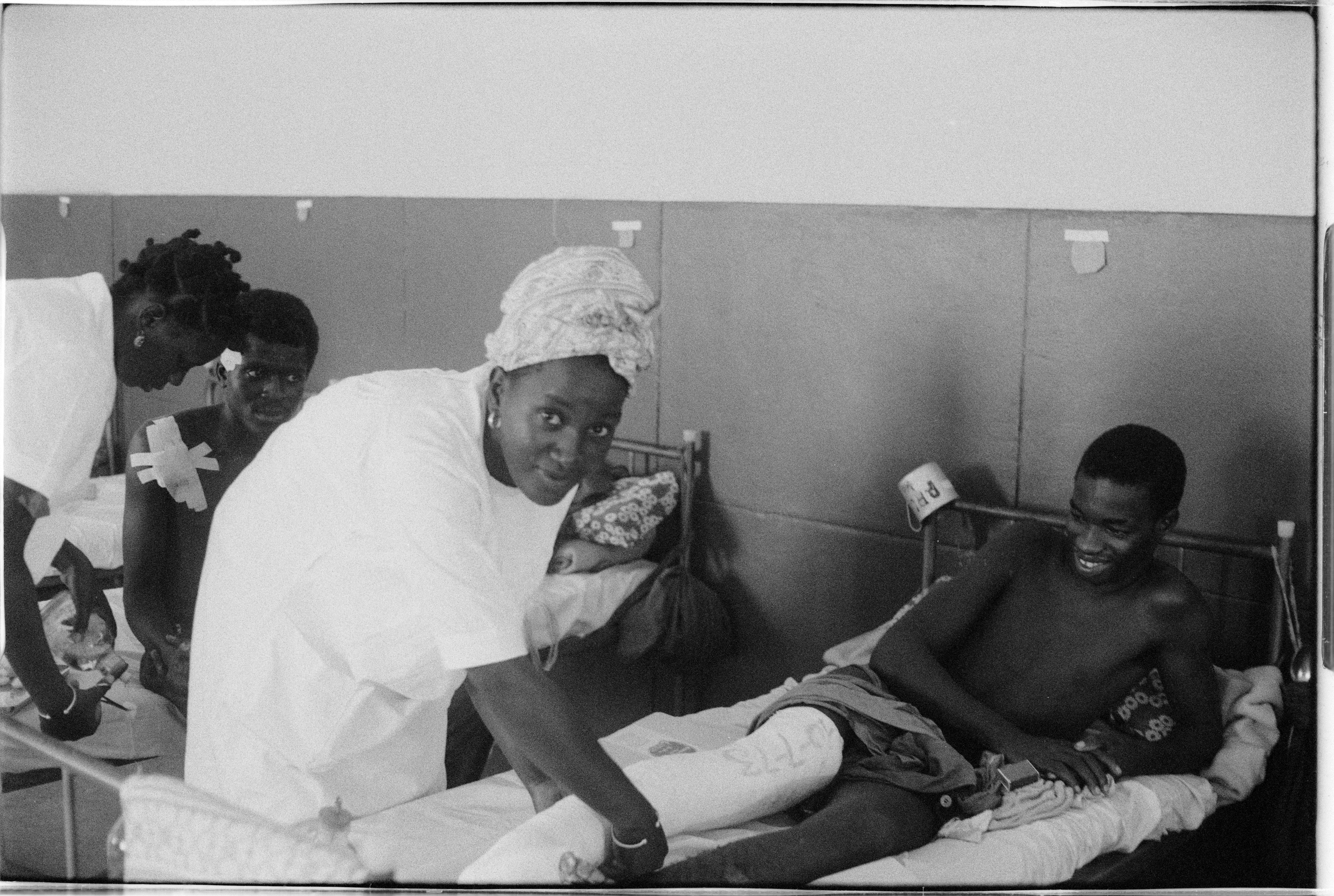
PAIGC Ziguinchor hospital, 1973

Ziguinchor sits at the narrowest part of the lower Casamance river and one end of a portage route to Buguendo on the Cacheu River, and has likely been an important trading post for many centuries. Historically it was a part of the Bainuk kingdom of Bichangor, and hosted a massive regional trade fair.

After a series of conflicts over trade opposing Lancados, the Bainuk, and the Kasa kingdom, relations between the former two improved as the latter's power declined in the 1580s and 90s. The Bainuk allowed the lancados to settle on the Casamance for the first time, likely in Ziguinchor. By 1609 there was a resident priest, and by 1621 the small community of Portuguese merchants had built a church and converted some locals.

The first official European settlement in the area was founded by the Portuguese in 1645 as a dependency of Cacheu populated by settlers from Cape Verde, and lancados and other Afro-Europeans.

The Portuguese objective was to found a trading post and establish an alliance with the local mansa or king of the Kasa kingdom. Chroniclers described him as the ruler most friendly to the Portuguese along the Guinean coast. The king started to live in a European manner, with table, chairs and western clothing. His court included several Portuguese merchants. One of the commodities for trade was enslaved Africans, and Ziguinchor became a slave port during much of the Portuguese rule.

The post boasted a fort with a few pieces of artillery by 1700, but was never an important economic center. The French occupied Carabane island downstream in 1836, forcing Portuguese ships to pay duties there. Despite frantic diplomatic efforts by governor Honório Barreto, Portugal never really tried to defend its claim to the region. Ziguinchor was eventually transferred to France on 22 April 1888, fulfilling a deal brokered at the Berlin Conference of 1886.

Under the French, Ziguinchor became a major trade port, mostly due to the intensive groundnut cultivation which the colonial government encouraged in the interior. By 1900, the area was largely converted to Christianity, although significant Syncretist and Muslim communities flourish.

Rice growing, the traditional crop of the region, was hurt by the government's push to cultivate groundnuts. They forced the clearing of extensive forest areas. The French government also imported rice from the intensive farming they encouraged in French Indochina, shrinking the market for Casamance's traditional main produce.

After independence, the city's economic growth slowed, in part due to the War of Independence in neighboring Guinea-Bissau. The Portuguese military crossed into the area at least once, pursuing PAIGC rebels. Cannon fire could be heard in the city for much of the war. During this period Ziguinchor became a main post for both the Senegalese Army and French forces, guarding the frontier that cut Jola families and communities in two.

As the capital of Casamance, Ziguinchor has been at the center of a three-decade-long conflict with Dakar that has flared into open civil war on more than one occasion. With a population with a majority of Diola and Christian, the effects of a large migration of Wolof Muslims fleeing drought in the north during the 1970s caused tensions to flare. A 1983 demonstration against price rises in Ziguinchor Market was put down violently by Senegalese forces, and an insurgency by the Movement of Democratic Forces of Casamance (MFDC) followed, effectively wrecking the economy of the region. The 2004 peace accords, signed in Ziguinchor, were hoped to be the end of the violence, but in 2006, sporadic fighting by an MFDC split and laying of land mines again erupted in rural areas nearby.

Ousmane Sonko, a prominent opposition leader, was elected mayor of Ziguinchor in 2022. The city was the scene of large protests in June 2023 after his conviction on charges that many Senegalese, especially youth, view as a political ploy by President Macky Sall to discredit a rival.

== Economy ==
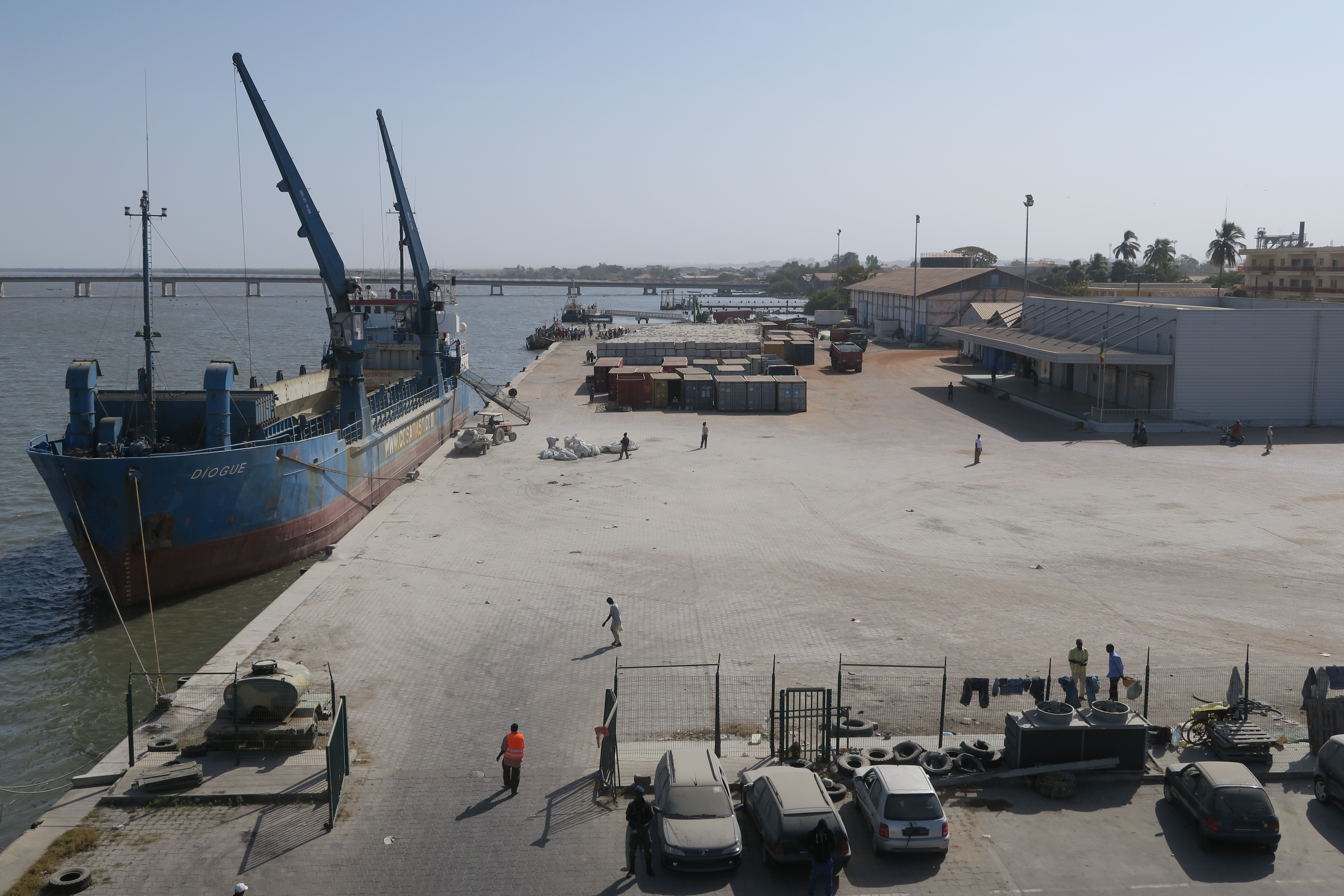
Port of Ziguinchor

Ziguinchor remains economically dependent on its role as a cargo port, transport hub and ferry terminal. The "Nationale 4" highway crosses the Casamance River just east of the city, linking the region with Bignona about 25 km to the north, and (via The Gambia), the rest of Senegal.

A vibrant tourist destination, the beaches of nearby Cap Skirring were discovered by foreign tourists in the 1960s, and the location was built up to become one of the first Club Med resorts. Ziguinchor region is also known for growing great quantities of rice, oranges, mangoes, bananas, cashews, tropical fruits and vegetables, fish, and prawns, much of which are processed locally and exported from the city, its port, and its airport. It is also home to a large peanut oil factory.

== Transport ==
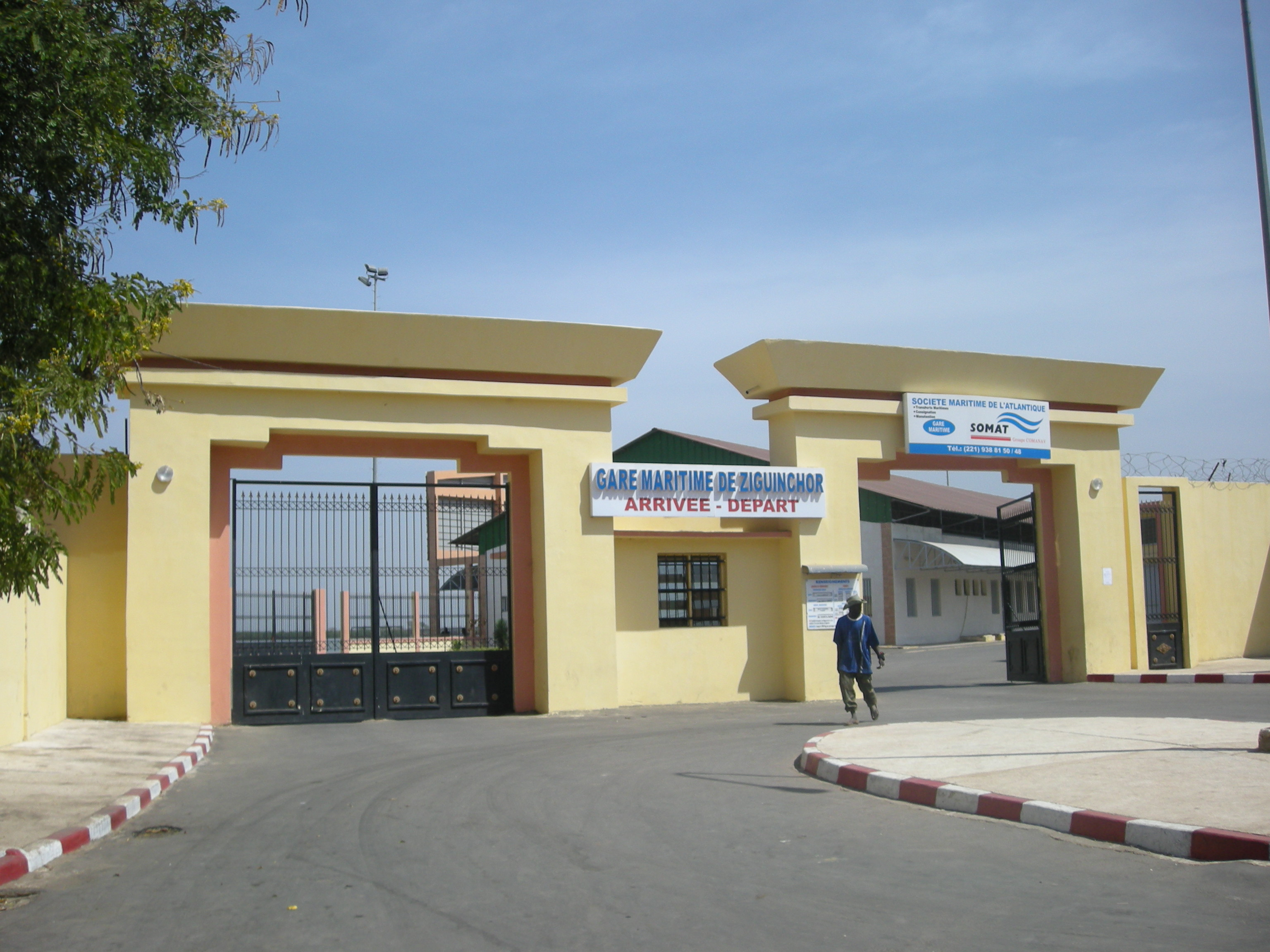
The ferry terminal

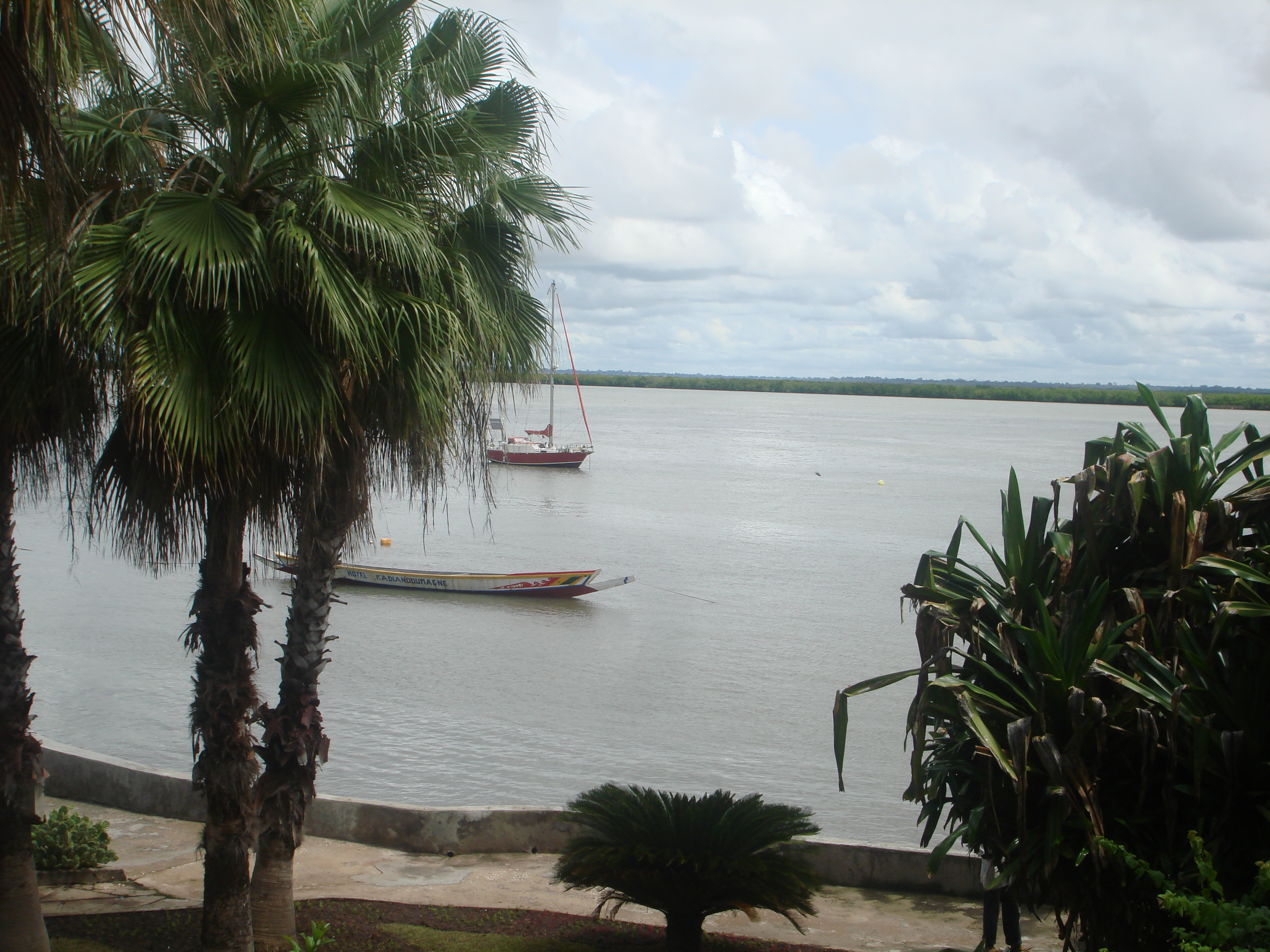
View on Casamance River

The MV Joola, which sank in 2002, was sailing from Ziguinchor to Dakar. The loss of the ferry, which was not replaced until 2005, cut the main link between Casamance and the rest of the country. The new ferry, which began regular runs in 2007, is named for local anti-colonial martyr Aline Sitoe Diatta, and promises a boost to the local economy.

The city has an airport, Ziguinchor Airport.

== Architecture ==
A number of buildings in the town have been classified by government decree as historic, the cemetery and several government buildings, like the Ziguinchor Regional Council.

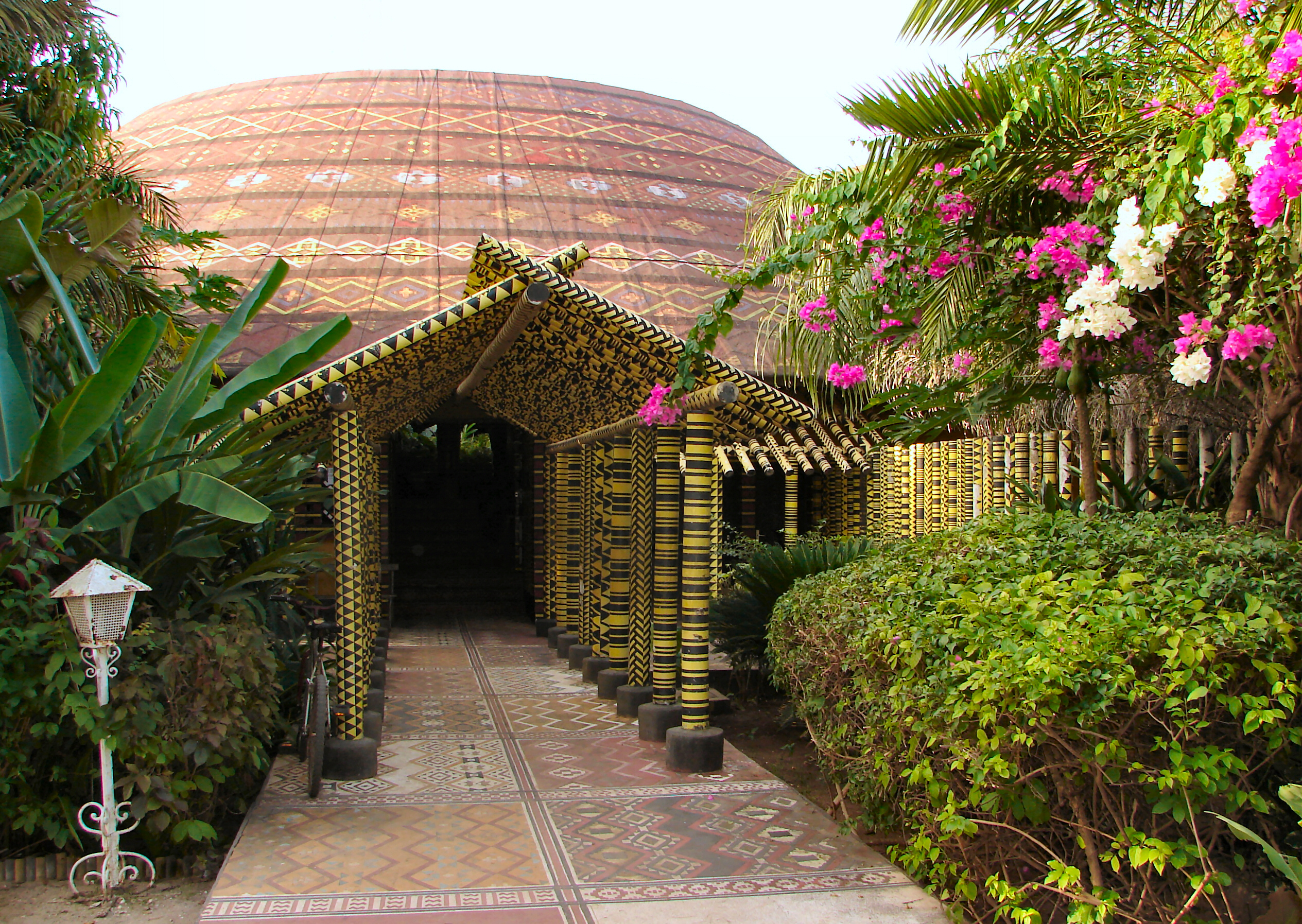
The Franco-Senegalese Alliance

== Places of worship ==
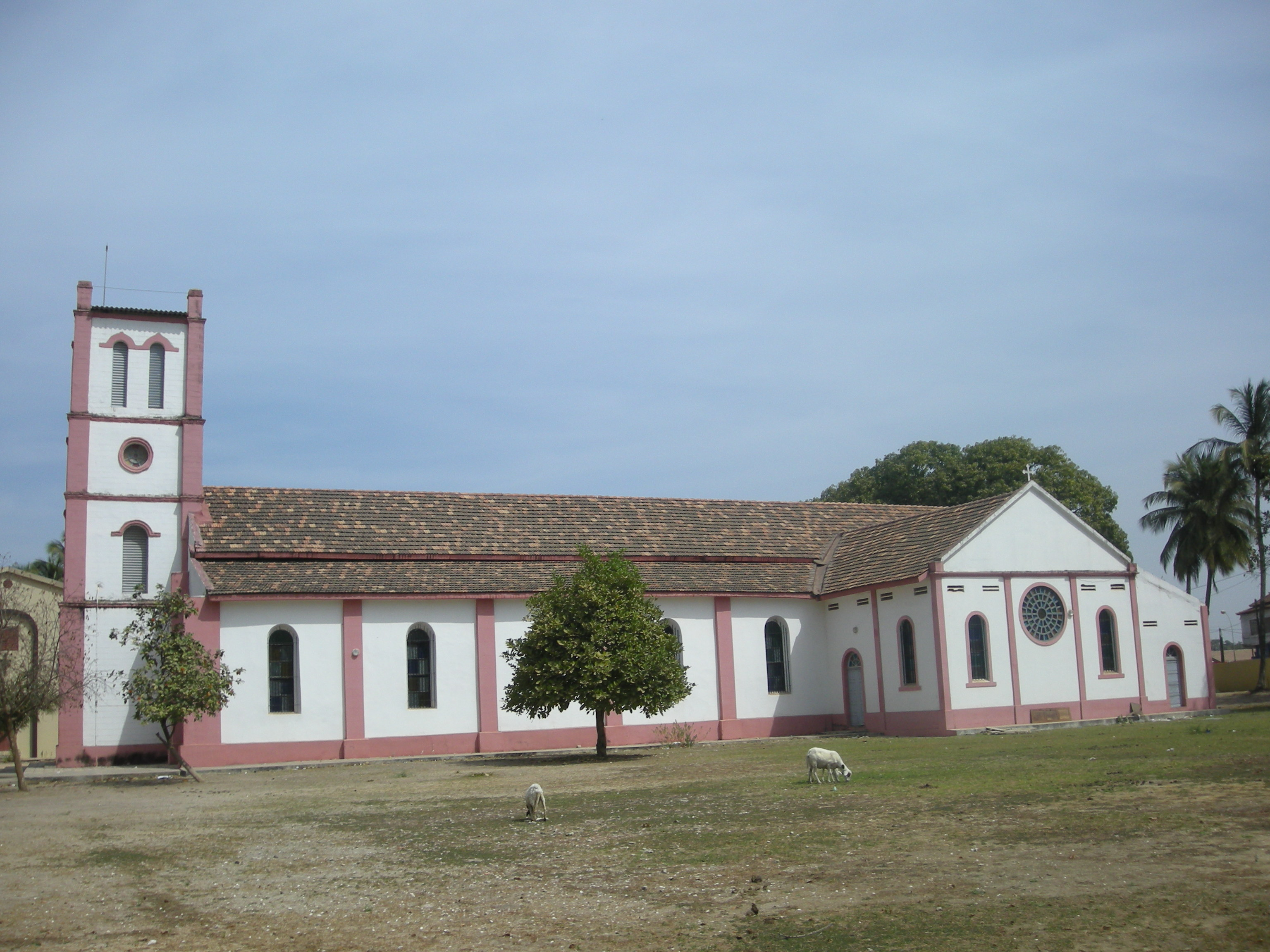
Saint-Antoine de Padoue Cathedral

Among the places of worship, they are predominantly Christian churches and temples: Roman Catholic Diocese of Ziguinchor (Catholic Church), Assemblies of God, Universal Church of the Kingdom of God. There are also Muslim mosques.

== Demography ==
Ziguinchor is a melting pot of all the ethnic groups co-existing in Senegal: Mandinka, Jola, Wolof, Fula/Halpulaar, Mancagne, Manjack, Soninke, Serer, Bainouk, Balanta and Creole. Jola have been the majority of the population in the region since at least 1500, and culturally share much with the people of Guinea-Bissau. One of three dialects of Guinea-Bissau Creole, Cacheu–Ziguinchor, is centered around the city. Resistant to first Islam and later Christianity, many Jola retain a degree of animist practices, while Basse Casamance is the only majority Catholic area in Senegal.

== Notable natives and residents ==
Ziguinchor is the birthplace of some famous Senegalese people.

=== Writers and filmmakers ===
- Sembene Ousmane

=== Artists ===
- The Tourekunda brothers

=== Politicians ===
- Djibril Sonko

=== Sportsmen ===
- Jules Francois Bocande, footballer
- Bassirou N'Diaye
- Lansana Coly, judoka
- Basile de Carvalho, footballer
- Aliou Cissé, footballer and coach
- Nicolas Jackson, footballer
- Sadio Mané, footballer

== Climate ==
Ziguinchor has a tropical savanna climate (Köppen Aw). It has hot, rainless winters and warm, very wet summers. The average annual rainfall is approximately 1,550 millimetres or 61 inches, which is more than three times that of Dakar, although less than half that of Conakry.

Climate data for Ziguinchor (1991–2020)
Month	Jan	Feb	Mar	Apr	May	Jun	Jul	Aug	Sep	Oct	Nov	Dec	Year
Mean daily maximum °C (°F)	34.1 (93.4)	36.7 (98.1)	38.4 (101.1)	38.4 (101.1)	37.2 (99.0)	35.5 (95.9)	33.1 (91.6)	32.3 (90.1)	33.0 (91.4)	34.4 (93.9)	34.6 (94.3)	33.7 (92.7)	35.1 (95.2)
Mean daily minimum °C (°F)	17.8 (64.0)	18.7 (65.7)	19.7 (67.5)	20.4 (68.7)	22.1 (71.8)	24.1 (75.4)	23.9 (75.0)	23.7 (74.7)	23.5 (74.3)	23.7 (74.7)	21.7 (71.1)	18.7 (65.7)	21.5 (70.7)
Record low °C (°F)	12.4 (54.3)	13.5 (56.3)	13.9 (57.0)	15.2 (59.4)	18.2 (64.8)	20.4 (68.7)	18.4 (65.1)	20.0 (68.0)	20.5 (68.9)	20.0 (68.0)	14.7 (58.5)	13.1 (55.6)	12.4 (54.3)
Average precipitation mm (inches)	4.9 (0.19)	0.2 (0.01)	0.0 (0.0)	0.0 (0.0)	2.9 (0.11)	93.1 (3.67)	341.1 (13.43)	480.7 (18.93)	358.6 (14.12)	113.5 (4.47)	6.1 (0.24)	0.1 (0.00)	1,401.2 (55.17)
Average precipitation days (≥ 1.0 mm)	1.2	0.1	0.0	0.0	0.7	6.6	17.5	21.4	18.4	7.9	0.3	0.0	74.1
Mean monthly sunshine hours	251.1	249.2	291.4	282.0	285.2	240.0	182.9	170.5	195.0	241.8	261.0	257.3	2,907.4
Mean daily sunshine hours	8.1	8.9	9.4	9.4	9.2	8.0	5.9	5.5	6.5	7.8	8.7	8.3	8.0
Source: NOAA (sun 1961-1990)

== Administration ==
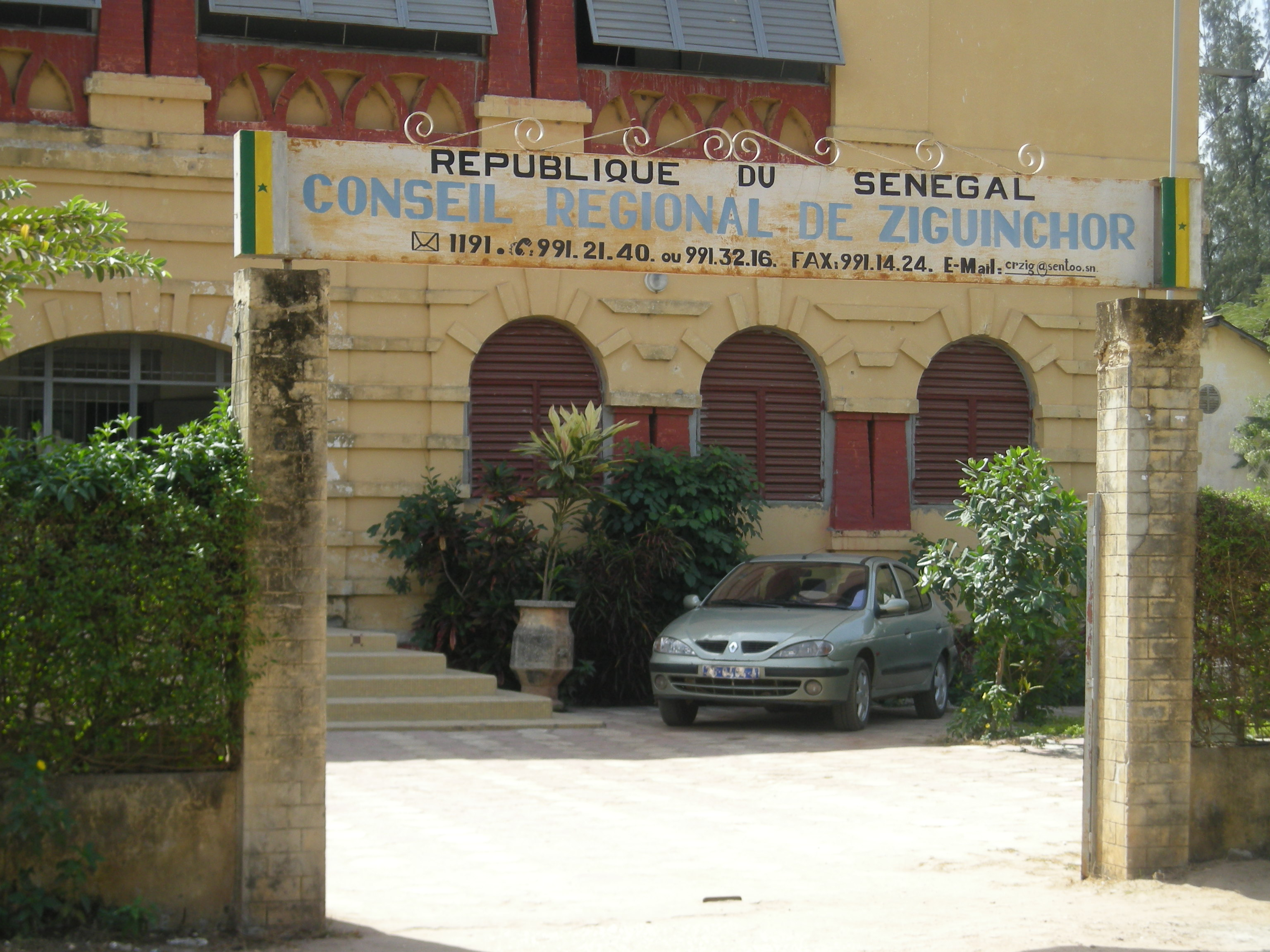
Ziguinchor Regional Council

In the decades following independence, Ziguinchor was a stronghold of the Socialist Party of Senegal (PS). Robert Sagna, a long-time minister in Socialist Party governments, was also Mayor of Ziguinchor from 1984 to 2009. In the beginning of 2007 Sagna left the PS and led the Taku Défaraat Sénégal coalition in a failed presidential bid. In 2001's legislative elections, a big push by President Abdoulaye Wade's ruling PDS party, spearheading the Sopi coalition (joined in 2008 by And-Jëf/Pads), was led by Ziguinchor politician Abdoulaye Baldé, a former General Secretary to the President. In the 2001 elections, the a Ziguinchor National Assembly seat was gained by the PDS, and held again in 2007, prompting speculation that Sagna and his party's days of dominating local politics were numbered. Sagna, though, won a legislative seat on proportional representation in 2007, and continued in both offices until 2009. The Sopi Coalition won the March 2009 local election in Ziguinchor, and Baldé was elected Mayor. He served until 2022, when he was defeated by Ousmane Sonko, a nationally prominent leader of the Yewwi Askan Wi coalition.

== Africa Cup of Nations ==
Ziguinchor was one of the venues for the 1992 Africa Cup of Nations football championship. The city Sports and Arts Associations conceived for the first time the concept of having specific suburbs barracking for each national team in order to give a vibrant and joyful atmosphere to the Football tournament that saw Algeria, Côte d'Ivoire, Ghana, Zambia, Egypt, Congo play the first half of the Championship in that city. This successful and original experience inspired other tournament organisers from then on. Mali hosting the 2002 Africa Cup of Nations used the same concept through the famous Ndiatiguiya, (having specific suburbs barracking for a specific team throughout the tournament), and then Korea/Japan during the 2002 World Cup used the same concept as well.

== Education ==
École française François-Rabelais, a French international school serving maternelle (preschool) through collège, is in Ziguinchor.

The Catholic University of West Africa opened a campus in Ziguinchor in 2006. Ziguinchor University was founded in 2007.

== Twin towns – sister cities ==
Ziguinchor is twinned with:

- Compiègne, France
- Rimini, Italy
- Saint-Maur-des-Fossés, France
- São Filipe, Cape Verde
- Viana do Castelo, Portugal
