= Liberalism in Bolivia =

This article gives an overview of liberal parties in Bolivia. It is limited to liberal parties with substantial support, mainly proved by having had a representation in parliament. The sign ⇒ means a reference to another party in that scheme. For inclusion in this scheme it is not necessary that a party label itself as liberal.

== Introduction ==
Liberalism was organized as a part of the oligarchy as the opposition to conservatism. It did not survive the 1952 revolution.

== The timeline ==
=== Liberal Party ===
- 1883: Liberals formed the Liberal Party (Partido Liberal)
- 1913: A dissident faction of the Liberal Party formed Radical Party (Partido Radical)
- 1943: After the revolution of 1943 the Partido Radical disappeared.
- 1952: After the revolution of 1952 the Partido Liberal de facto disappeared as a political party

== Liberal leader ==
- Hernán Siles Zuazo

== See also ==
- History of Bolivia
- Politics of Bolivia
- List of political parties in Bolivia
