= Gaston Berger University =

Public university in Senegal

- Université Gaston Berger
- Established: December 17, 1990; 35 years ago
- Location: Saint-Louis, Senegal; 16°03′45″N 16°25′33″W
- Website: www.ugb.sn

Gaston Berger University (GBU), or L'Université Gaston Berger (UGB), located some 12 km (7.5 mi) outside Saint-Louis, was the second university established in Senegal (the first being Cheikh Anta Diop University). Originally the University of Saint-Louis, it was renamed for Gaston Berger, an important French-Senegalese philosopher, on December 4, 1996.

== History ==
The first stone was laid by Senegalese President Léopold Sédar Senghor on January 14, 1975.

Established officially by law no. 90-03 of January 2, 1990, GBU welcomed its first class of six hundred students on December 17, 1990. The first rector was Ahmadou Lamine Ndiaye, who held office from January 1990 until November 1999.

The university is funded by a grant from the government of Senegal, established by law No. 96-597 of July 10, 1996.

The university was named in honor of French-Senegalese philosopher Gaston Berger, who was born in Saint-Louis and was the father of Maurice Béjart. Nonetheless, the university is often referred to as the University of Saint-Louis, just as UCAD is often referred to as the University of Dakar.

== Surroundings ==
Gaston Berger University is 12 km from the town of Saint-Louis. The school's primary architectural fixture is the central library's tower, which is visible from national road N2, stretching from Richard-Toll to the Mauritanian border.

The university is situated in two towns, Sanar Peulh and Sanar Wolof, which are inhabited respectively by ethnic Fulas and Wolofs. Many refer to the university by the name "Sanar" due to its location. Alumni are sometimes referred to as "Sunusanars."

== Research and teaching divisions ==
The University of Gaston Berger is composed of four teaching and research colleges:

- Liberal Arts and Social Sciences
- Applied Science and Technology
- Judicial and Political Science
- Economics and Business Management

A medical college was scheduled to open October 2008, in cooperation with Temple University in Pennsylvania (United States).

The academic year spans a ten-month period between October and July, but the start and end of classes varies by department.

=== Liberal Arts and Social Sciences ===
The College of Liberal Arts and Social Sciences is composed of five departments: English Language Studies, French Language Studies, Applied Foreign Languages (LEA), Geography, and Sociology. Admission is granted uniformly is made up by section.

==== Admissions ====
Students are admitted to the first year of the first degree if they have earned Baccalaureates in levels L or S and if they satisfy these secondary school accomplishments:

- High grades earned on the Baccalaureate
- Admission to the first tier of the Baccalaureate
- Mention obtained in the Baccalaureate
- High grades in subjects related to department of admission
- Being less than 23 years of age

=== Applied Sciences and Technology ===
The College of Applied Science and Technology is composed of four departments: Applied Mathematics, Computer Sciences, Applied Physics, and Professional Studies.

Applied Sciences and Technologies has grown significantly since 2000. New graduate degrees are being offered in:

- MASS (Applied Mathematics and Social Sciences)
- MPI (Mathematics, Physics, and Computer Sciences)

In 2002, new studies were established:

- DIETEL (Diploma in Electronic and Telecommunications Engineering)
- MIAGE (Diploma in Computer Methods for Business Management)
- DESS (Diploma in Computer Science and Communications Technology)
- MAIF (Diploma in Mathematics and Financial Computing, offered as Bachelors and a Master's degrees)

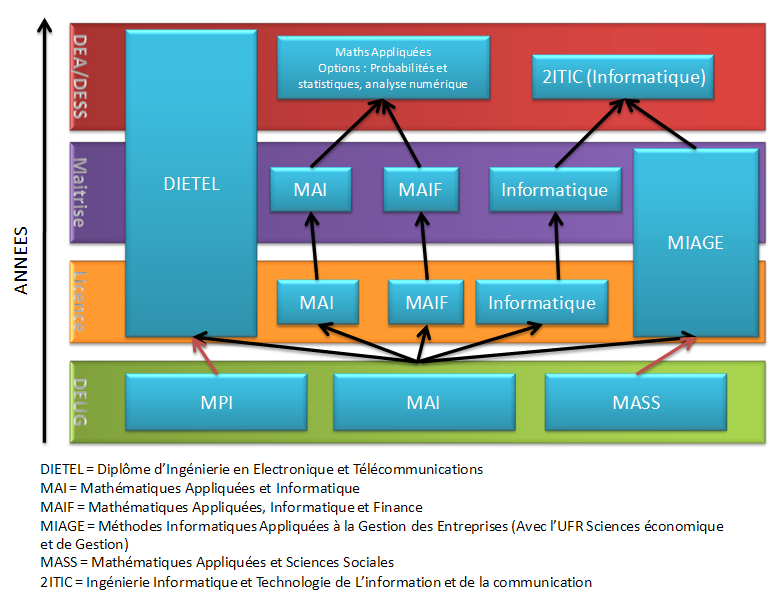
Possible degree courses in Applied Sciences and Technology

==== Admission ====
Admission to the College of Applied Sciences and Technology depends on an applicant's qualifications related to their department of admission.

===== Department of Applied Mathematics =====
The Department of Applied Mathematics offers three comprehensive degrees:

- The first cycle concerns basic mathematics with some emphasis on computing.
- The second cycle represents a Bachelor's degree in Applied Mathematics, five units, and a Masters in Basic Mathematics, three units plus two units of personal direction in either:
  - Numerical Analysis
  - Probability and Statistics

The third cycle involves participation in the department's research teams in either Numerical Analysis or Probability and Statistics. The third cycle comprises one year of research to obtain the Certificate of Advanced Studies (AEA) in applied mathematics and a second year pursuing a Diploma of Advanced Studies (DEA).

== Student life ==
=== Housing ===
Student housing is provided on campus and is organized in collegiate villages. Villages A through G and Village K were built before 2000 and are referred to as Campus One. Campus One houses undergraduate students. Rooms are shared between two students, who often divide their room using a curtain. Students often refer to their compartments as pockets.

Villages H through L provide non-shared rooms and are reserved for students pursuing graduate degrees.

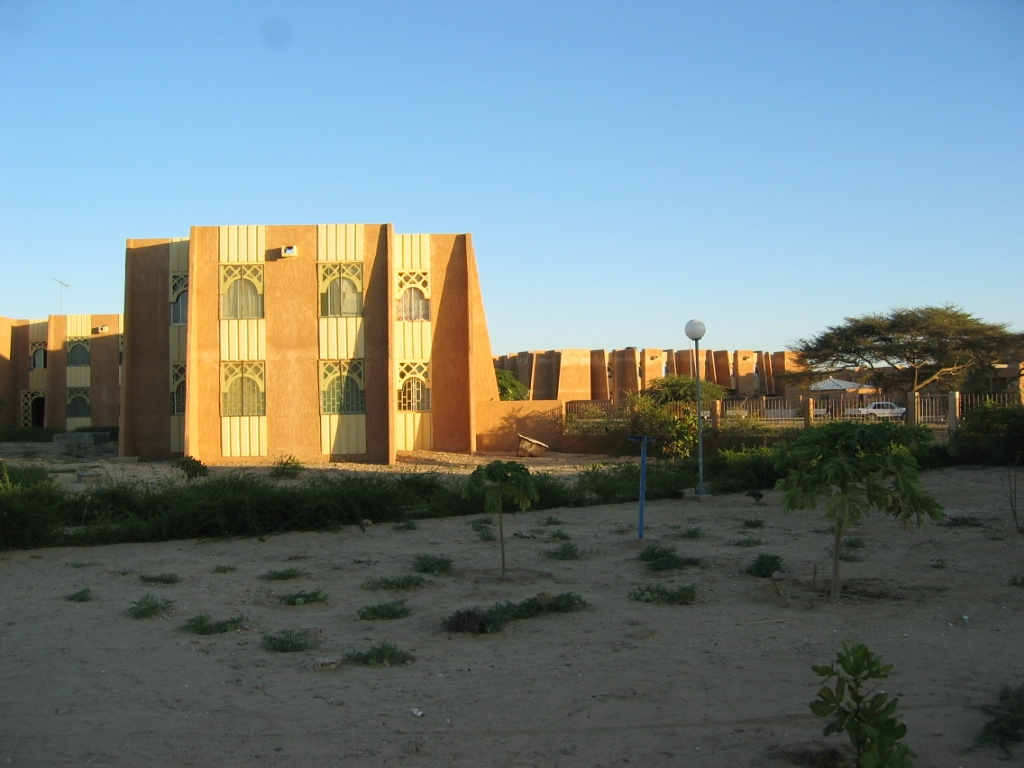
Campus 2

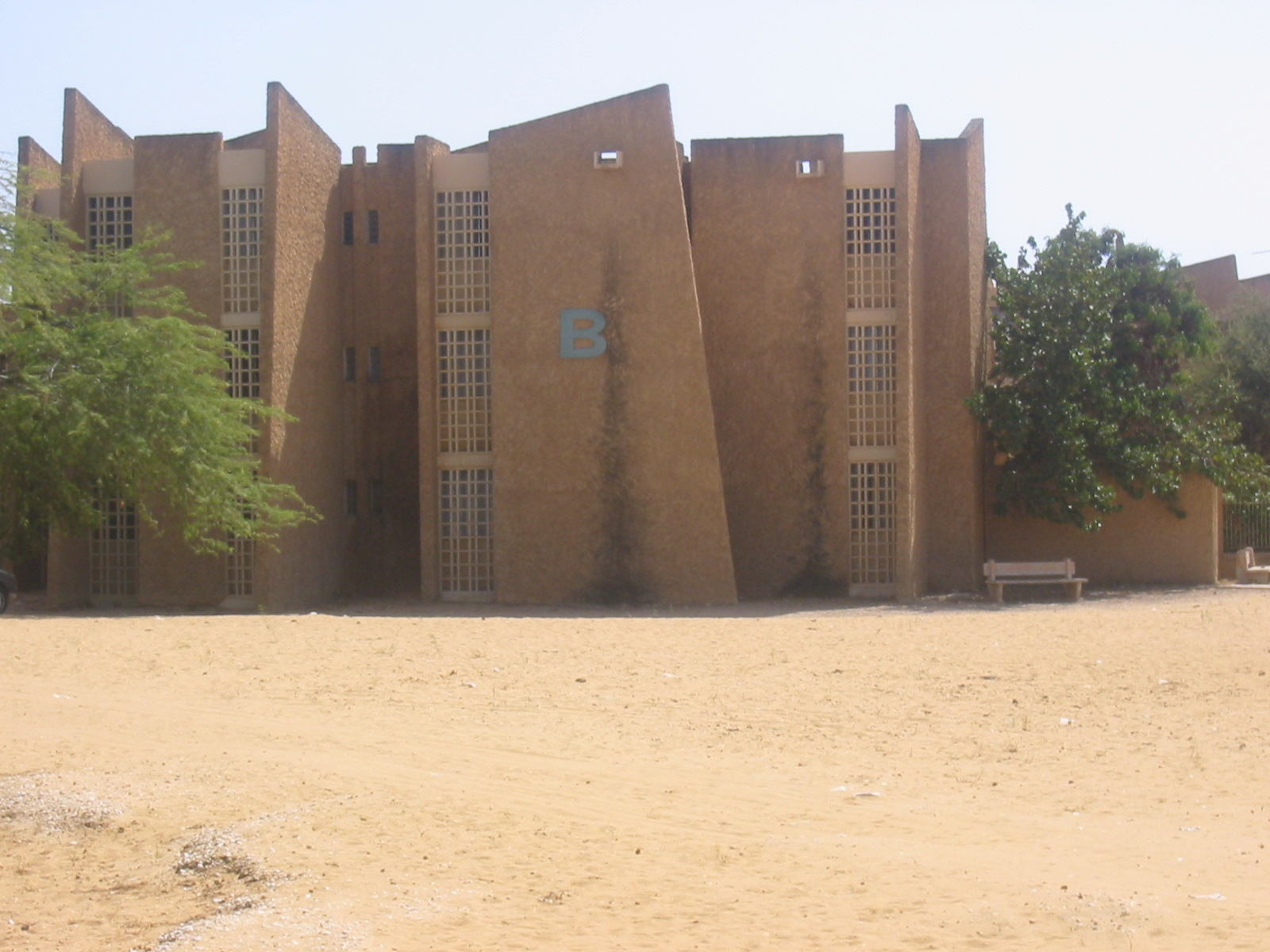
Village B

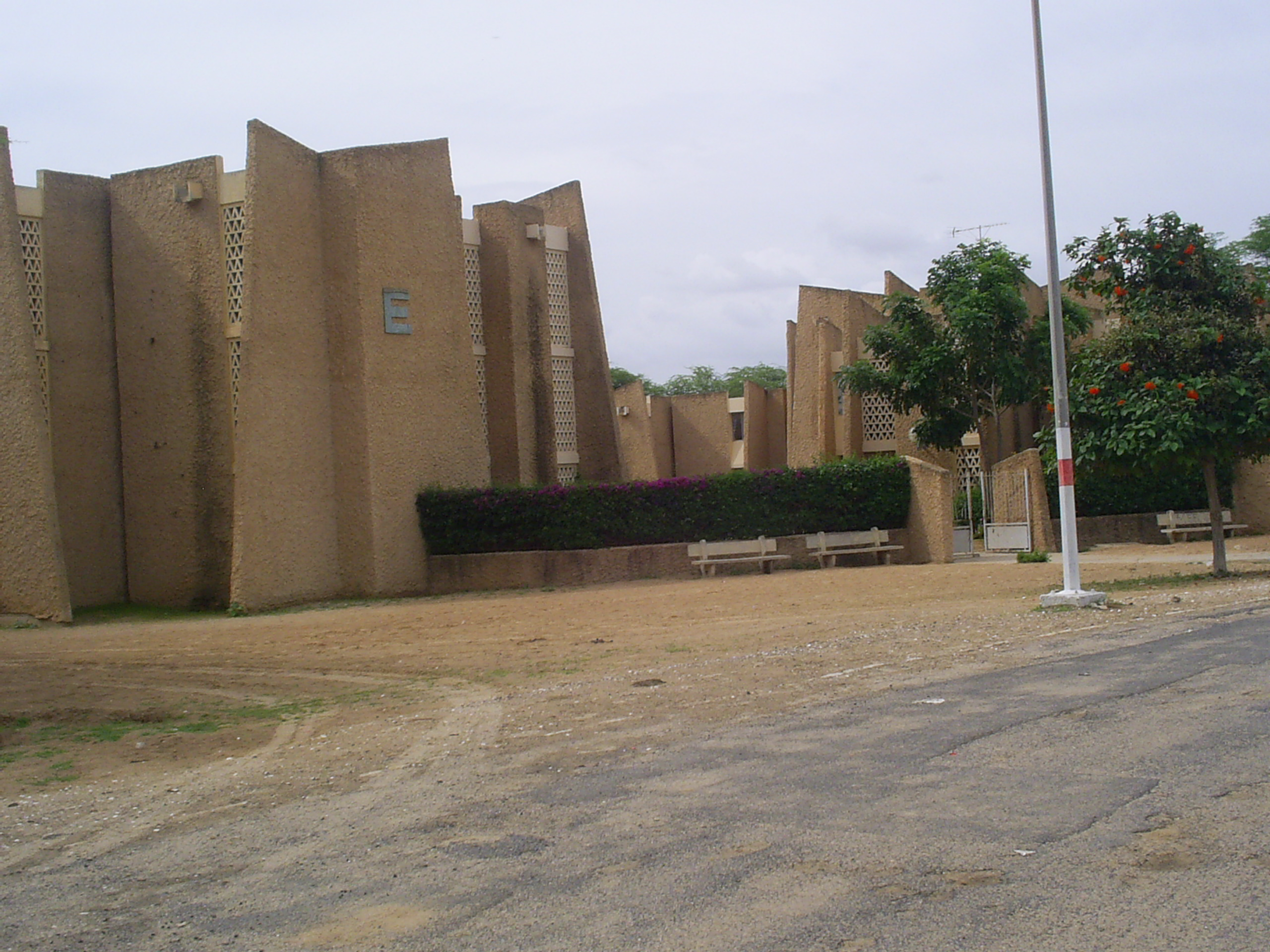
Village E

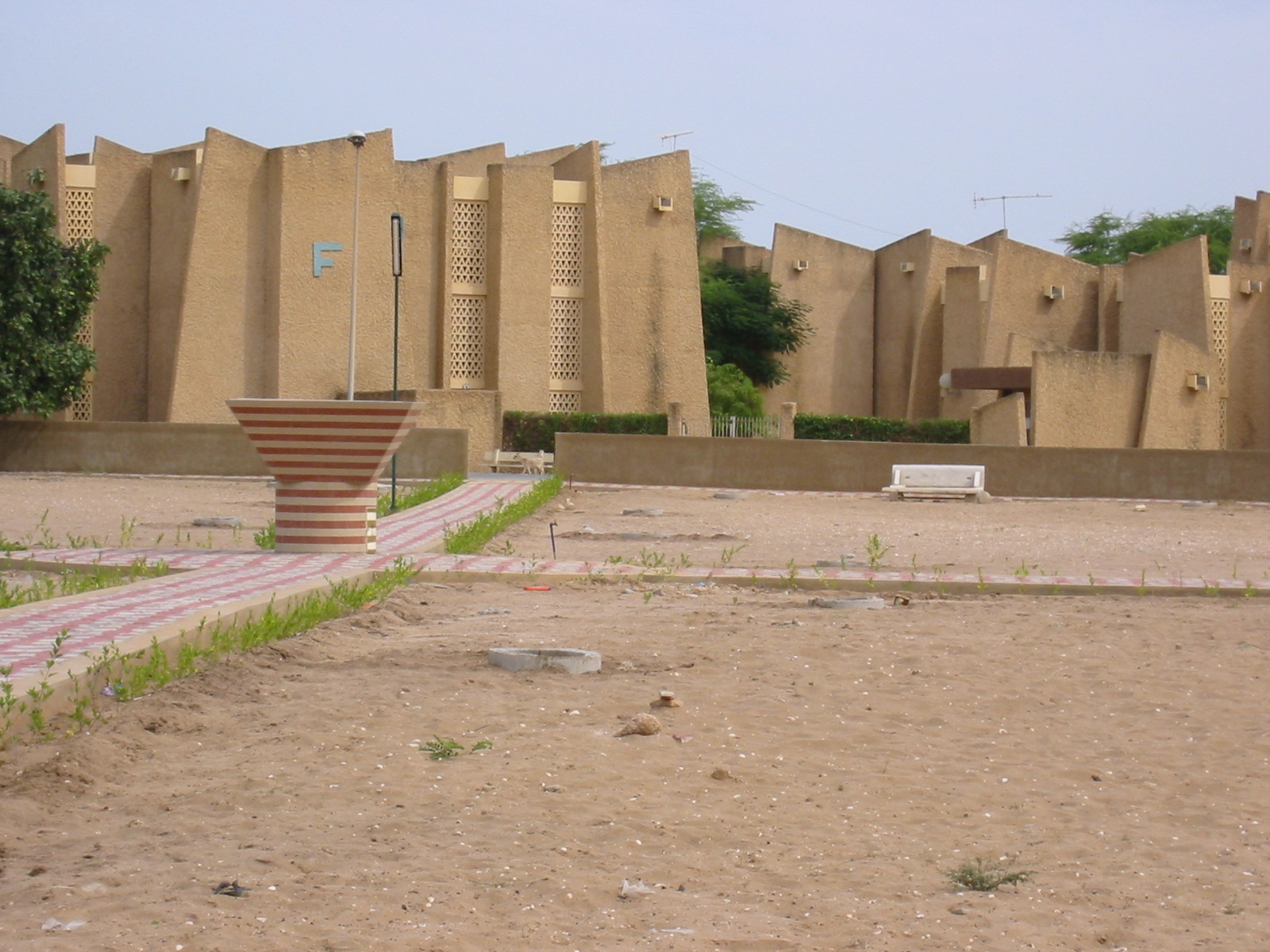
Village F

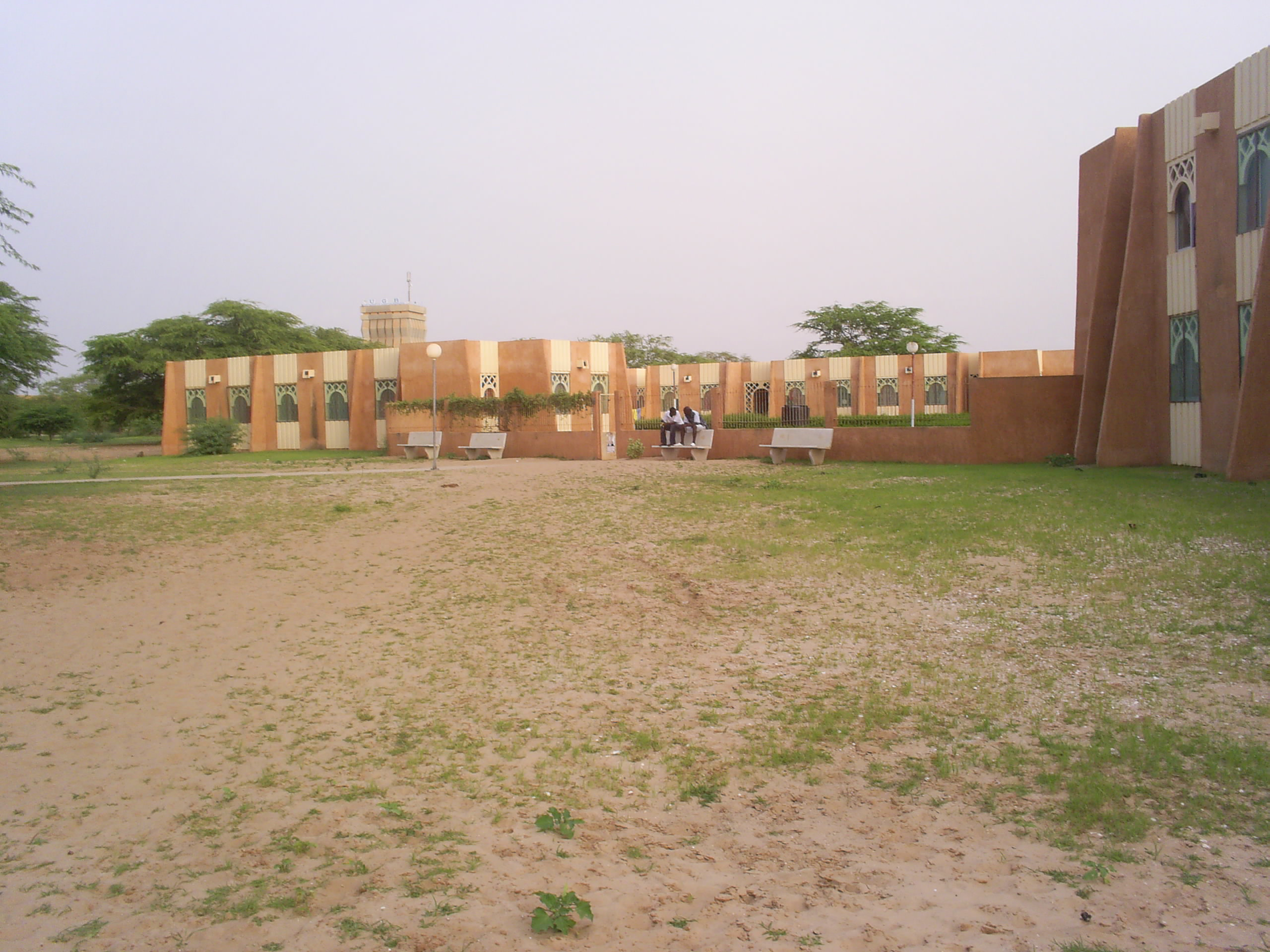
Village H

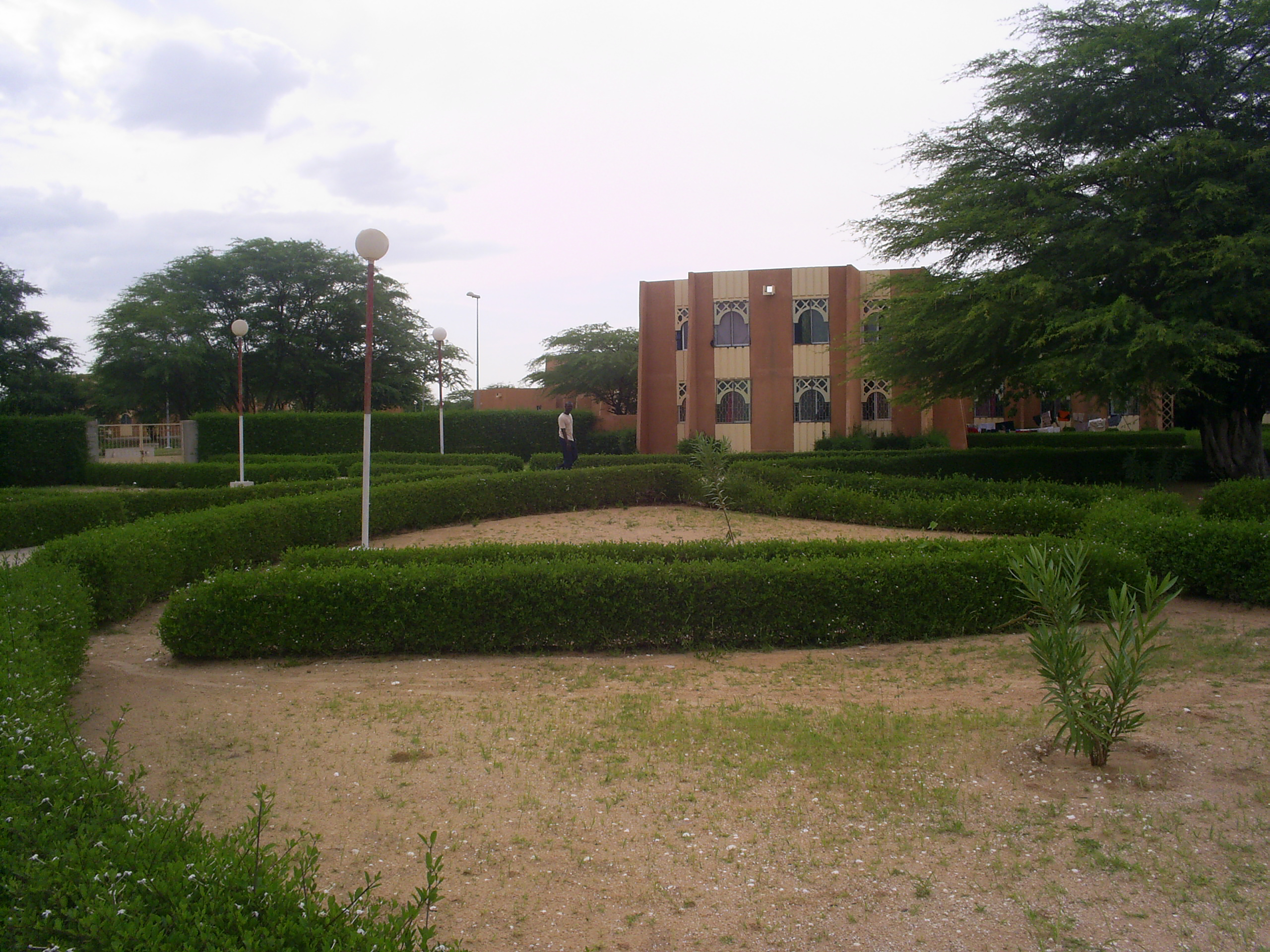
Village H

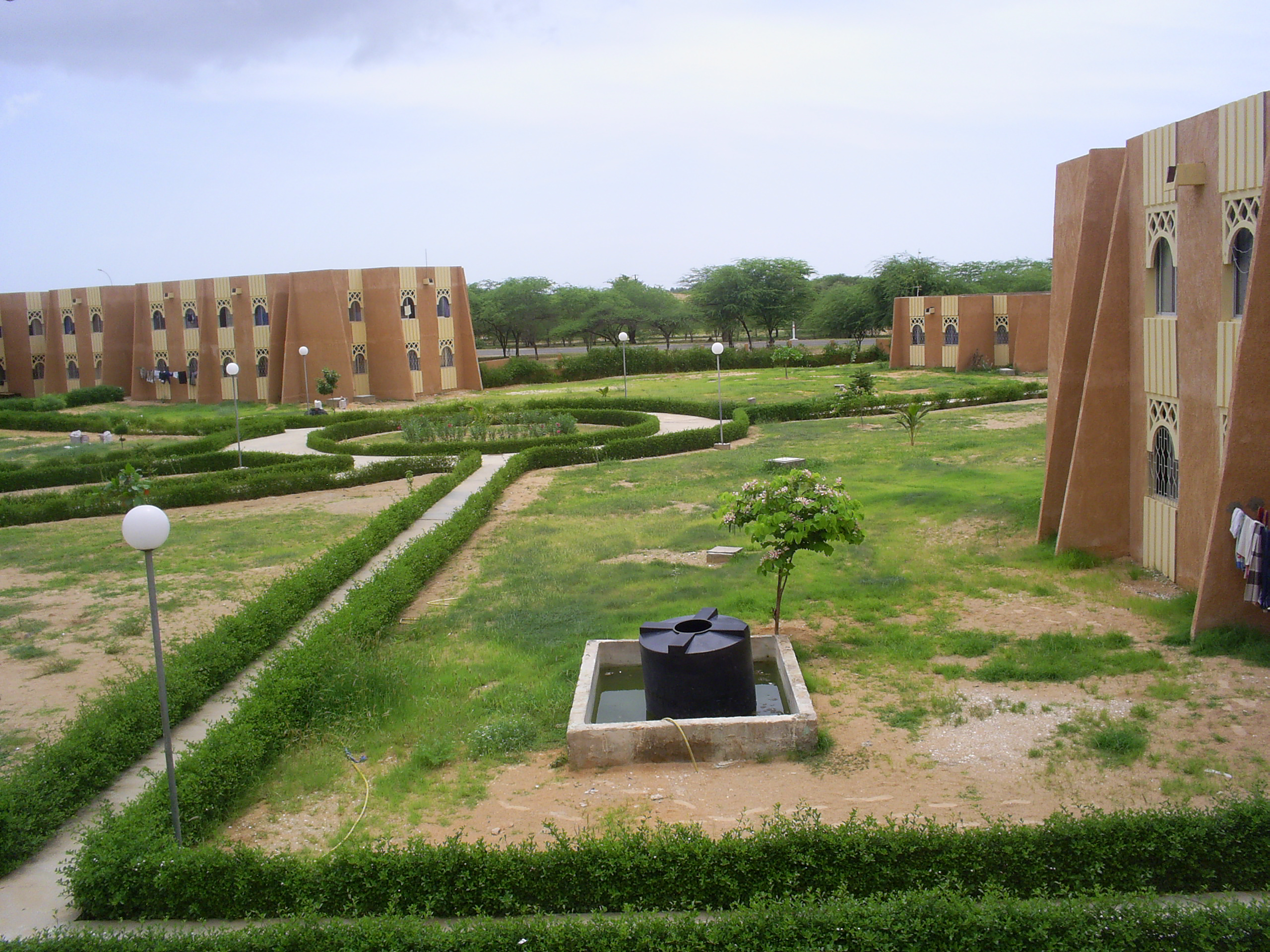
Village L

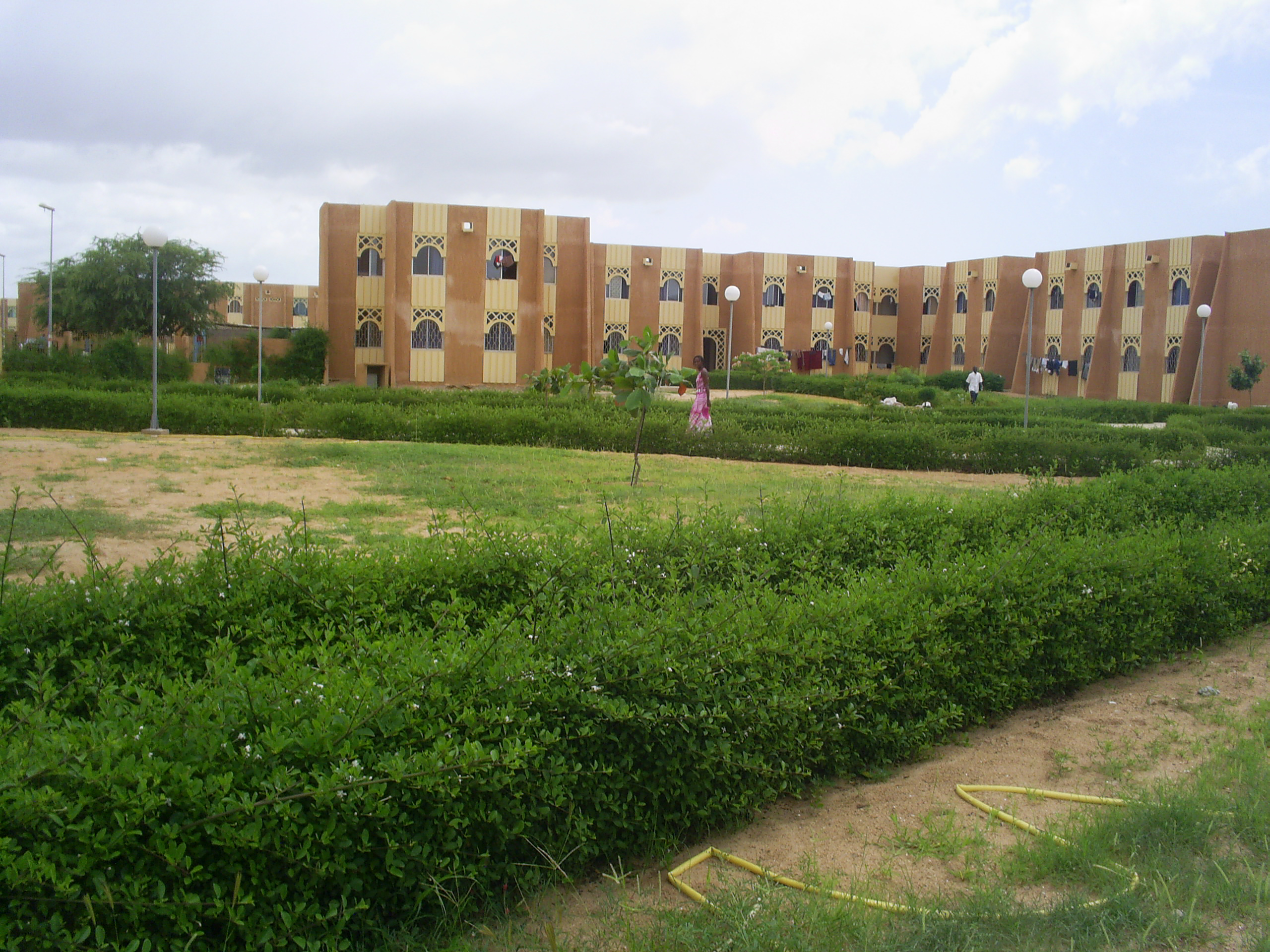
Village L

Housing costs have been rising modestly but are supplemented by financial aid from the government and, typically, by funds provided by students' parents.

University housing costs
	Cost to Senegalese students	Cost to non-Senegalese citizens
Villages A,B,C,D,E,F,K (M?)	3000 (4,57euros)	???
Villages H,I,J,L	4000 (6,09euros)	???

== See also ==
=== Related articles ===
- List of Islamic educational institutions
- Cheikh Anta Diop University
- Education in Senegal
- List of universities in Senegal

=== Bibliography ===
- Pamphlet on GBU in a news publication on higher education in Senegal, Le Soleil, January 2008, p. 5–6
