= Pan-African University =

African post-graduate research network

Pan African University (PAU)
- Formation: 2008
- Purpose: Post-graduate education
- Region served: Africa
- Council President: Tolly Mbwette
- Council Vice President: Paulo de Carvalho
- Interim Deputy Rector: Belay Kassa
- Parent organization: African Union

The Pan-African University (or Pan African University) (PAU) is a post-graduate training and research network of university nodes in five regions, supported by the African Union and the Association of African Universities.

== History ==
The first African Ministerial Conference on Science and Technology was held in 2003 in Johannesburg, South Africa with the aim of improving the quality of science and technology education and thereby the productivity of African economies. These ideas were elaborated in a "concept note" that outlined the objectives of the PAU. In 2008 the African Union agreed that the PAU should be established.A panel was appointed in 2009 to oversee the PAU, and the PAU was launched on 14 December 2011. A panel including figures such as Njabulo Ndebele and Ahmadou Lamine Ndiaye, oversaw its creation. The university's statute was adopted in 2013.

The initial PAU panel included Njabulo Ndebele, author and former vice-chancellor of the University of Cape Town in South Africa, and Ahmadou Lamine Ndiaye, president of the Senegal Academy of Science and Technology. An interim Rectorate took over the high-level panel, headed by Deputy Rector Professor Kassa Belay of Ethiopia. A steering committee including representatives of the African Union Commission, African academics, Africans in the Diaspora, partners, and the public and private sector performed the role of a Council until the establishment of the official PAU Council in June 2015.

The January 2015 Summit of Heads of State and Government appointed Tolly Mbwette (Tanzania) as the President and Paulo Horácio de Sequeira e Carvalho (Angola) as the Vice President of the PAU Council for a three-year term, based on regional nominations. The PAU Council met in June and October of 2015, discussing the project's progress and development, and the possibility of amending the PAU Statute to confer greater autonomy upon the university. A roadmap was adopted to relocate the Rectorate to Yaoundé by the end of March 2016.

== Regional institutes ==
UN subregions of Africa

The Pan African University addresses five thematic areas, through a network of five flagship institutes: Basic Sciences, Technology, and Innovation; Life and Earth Scienecs (including Health and Agriculture), Governance, Humanities, and Social Sciences; Water and Energy Sciences (including Climate Change); and Space Sciences.

== Implementation status ==
PAU Institutes are operational in four of Africa's five regions: Western, Eastern, Central, and Northern. Negotiations are ongoing to establish the fifth PAU Institute in Southern Africa. The first batch of students graduated in 2014.

== PAU scholarship grants ==
PAU provides full scholarships to students selected through a competitive admissions process. The scholarship covers tuition fees, stipends for living expenses, travel allowances, and medical insurance. Students commit to serving an African Union Member State for a period equal to the scholarship duration after completing their studies.

== Pan African University Alumni Association ==
A cross-section of PAU graduates (5 from each Institute) was invited by The African Union Commission (AUC) and PAU to participate in the establishment of and attend the first General Assembly of the PAUAA from 12 – 13 December 2017.
