= Université du Sahel =

- Type: Private
- Established: 1998; 28 years ago
- Location: Dakar, Senegal; 14.7115°N 17.4782°W
- Website: https://sahel.education/

Université du Sahel (UNIS) is located in Dakar, Senegal. It was founded in 1998.
