= Eje Comunero =

Eje Comunero was a political party in Bolivia. It was formed in the 1980s, as the indigenous sector of the Axis of Patriotic Convergence broke away and formed their own party (citing that the White leadership of the party failed to understand indigenous demands). Eje Comunero was one of the first political parties in the country to take up the cause of coca growers.
