= Ziguinchor University =

Higher education institution in Senegal

- Université de Ziguinchor
- Motto: L'excellence mon choix
- Type: Public
- Established: 2007; 19 years ago
- Location: Ziguinchor, Casamance, Senegal; 12.5482°N 16.2868°W
- Website: http://www.univ-zig.sn/

Ziguinchor University or (French: Université de Ziguinchor or UDZ) is located in Ziguinchor, Casamance, Senegal. It was founded in 2007.

== See also ==
- List of universities in Senegal
- Education in Senegal
