= Alioune Badara Bèye =

Senegalese writer (1945–2024)

Alioune Badara Bèye (28 September 1945 – 1 December 2024) was a Senegalese civil servant, novelist, playwright, poet and publisher.

In relation to his role as President of L'Association des écrivains du Sénégal (The Senegal Writers' Association), Bèye was the general coordinator of the Festival Mondial des Arts Nègres (Black Arts World Festival) in Dakar on 14 December 2009.

Bèye was born in Saint-Louis, Senegal on 28 September 1945, and died on 1 December 2024, at the age of 79.

== Works ==
- Dialawali, terre de feu ("Dialawali, Land of Fire"), 1980 (theatre)
- Le sacre du cedo ("Cedo Coronation") 1982 (theatre)
- Maba, laisse le Sine ("Maba, leaves the Sine"), 1987 (theatre)
- Nder en flammes ("Nder in Flames"), 1988 (theatre)
- Demain, la fin du monde: un avertissement à tous les dictateurs du monde ("Tomorrow, the End of the World: a Warning of all the World's Dictators"), 1993 (theatre)
- Les larmes de la patrie ("Tears from Homeland"), 2003 (theatre)
- Raki : fille lumière ("Raki: Light Daughter"), 2004 (novel)
- Les bourgeons de l'espoir ("Buds of Hope"), 2005 (poetry)
- De l'uniforme à la plume ("From Uniform to Pen"), 2008

=== Bibliography ===
- (in English) Peter France, The new Oxford companion to literature in French, Clarendon Press, 1995, p. 90
- (in French) Babacar Sall, Poésie du Sénégal, Silex/Agence de coopération culturelle et technique, 1988, p. 5
