= Bolivian Democratic Union =

The Bolivian Democratic Union (Spanish: Unión Democrática Boliviana, UDB) was a right-wing political party in Bolivia founded by Carlos Valdez Molina and Nidio Calavi Castellanos in 1978.

In 1979 it allied with the Bolivian Union Party and its candidate Walter Gonzáles Valda.

It disbanded following the Bolivian coup d'état on 17 July 1980.
