= Alioune Diop University of Bambey =

Public university in Bambey, Senegal

- Université Alioune Diop de Bambey
- Former names: Collège universitaire régional de Bambey
- Established: 2007; 19 years ago
- Academic affiliations: Agence universitaire de la Francophonie
- Rector: Pr Mahy DIAW
- Location: Bambey, Senegal; 14.69590990°N 16.47834970°W
- Website: www.uadb.edu.sn

Alioune Diop University of Bambey (French: Université Alioune Diop de Bambey) is a public higher education institution located in Bambey in the Diourbel region of west-central Senegal. The university is a member of the Agence universitaire de la Francophonie.

== History ==
Created in January 2007, the Regional University College of Bambey was converted into a university in November 2009 (Decree n° 2009–1221). It was part of the Senegalese government's efforts to decentralise higher-education provision, seeking to encourage youth to stay in rural areas and to provide educational programmes appropriate to these contexts.

In August 2011, the institution took the name "Alioune Diop University of Bambey", in tribute to Alioune Diop, founder of the magazine Présence africaine.

== Bambey Campus Extension ==
In 2017, Alioune Diop University added a new lecture building to its Bambey campus. A large tree on campus inspired the building's design, and like the tree, the building was intended to offer shelter, shade, and freshness for students.

Designed by architects IDOM of Bilbao, Spain the lecture building incorporates sustainable elements to cope with environmental challenges such as the rainy season and scarce resources. The structure comprises a 500-seat lecture hall, five 50-student classrooms, eight 100-student classrooms, three laboratories, ten lecturers' offices and two meeting rooms. The architects found a way to keep the temperature cool without the use of air conditioning. Even when the temperature outside reaches 40 degrees Celsius, the interior can remain a comfortable 25 degrees Celsius.

One bioclimatic strategy the architects used was a large double roof canopy which allows air to circulate. A cantilevered roof provides shade along the south side of the building. The building also incorporates locally sourced, air-permeable bricks to form a latticework, filtering sunlight while allowing airflow.

The campus experiences flooding from torrential rain during the rainy season, from December to May. To prevent the building from flooding, an infiltration reservoir on one side collects water. This enables plants to grow on rafts, including citronella, which is intended to minimize mosquito populations near the building Waste water filters through a system using activated sludge.

The Alioune Diop University Teaching and Research Unit was announced as one of the six 2019 Aga Khan Award for Architecture winners. Award jurors were impressed with how the architects coped with environmental challenges while remaining sensitive to sustainability issues.

For years we knew the Aga Khan awards and their philosophy of social commitment that we deeply admire. That is why it is an extraordinary honor and pride, a dream to receive this award, but not only for us, but also for all our colleagues, the client, the Government, and the people who worked on the work. We are tremendously grateful. (Quote from the winning team)

The building houses training and research facilities for applied sciences and information and communications technology. The amphitheatre, classrooms, technology rooms, and laboratories can accommodate up to 1,500 students.

== See also ==
- Education in Senegal
- List of universities in Senegal
