= Dakar Bourguiba University =

University in Dakar, Senegal

- Université Dakar Bourguiba
- Type: Private
- Established: 1995; 31 years ago
- Location: Dakar, Senegal; 14.7187°N 17.4495°W
- Website: http://www.udb.sn

Dakar Bourguiba University or (French: Université Dakar Bourguiba or UDB) is located in Dakar, Senegal. It was founded in 1995.
