= Mandy (given name) =

- Pronunciation: /mændi/ MAN-dee
- Gender: Unisex
- Language: English

Origin
- Languages: English, Latin
- Origin: Diminutive form of Amanda
- Meaning: Lovable (when derived from Amanda)
- Region of origin: England

Other names
- Variant forms: Mandie, Mandi
- Related names: Amanda, Amandus, Miranda, Mandel, Emmanuel, Manda, Mandana, Mansur, Manuel, Norman, Normand, Manfred, Armand, Armando, Samantha, Amandine

Mandy can be used as a given name, a diminutive, or a nickname for both female and male genders. It is often used as a diminutive (i.e., short form, see hypocorism) of the female names Amanda and Miranda, as well as being a given name in its own right. It is also used as a diminutive for the masculine names Armand, Armando, Mandel, Mansur or Emmanuel. Variants, for both male and female, include Mandi, Mandie, and Manda.

Its usage as a popular female name can be traced back to at least the beginning of the 20th century, with the song "Mandy" by Irving Berlin in 1919, and the Milly-Molly-Mandy series of children's books by Joyce Lankester Brisley in the 1920s. The pop songs "Mandy" by Barry Manilow (1974) and the Irish boyband Westlife (2003) and "I'm Mandy Fly Me" by 10cc (1976) speak to the resurgent popularity of the name in more recent times.

== Given name ==
=== Female ===
- Mandy Aftel, American perfumer
- Mandy Adamson (1972–2022), South African professional golfer
- Mandy Barker (born 1964), British photographer
- Mandy van den Berg (born 1990), Dutch footballer
- Mandy Boyd (born 1991), New Zealand lawn bowls player
- Mandy Brown-Ojugbana, Nigerian musician and radio presenter
- Mandy Bujold (born 1987), Canadian boxer
- Mandy Burrekers (born 1988), Dutch team handball goalkeeper
- Mandy Butcher (born 1986), Canadian actress
- Mandy Candy (born 1988), Brazilian YouTuber
- Mandy Capristo (born 1990), German singer
- Mandy Carter (activist) (born 1948), American activist
- Mandy Charlet (born 1986), Luxembourgish sportsperson
- Mandy Chiang (born 1982), Hong Kong pop singer and actress
- Mandy Chick (born 2001), American racing driver
- Mandy Cho (born 1982), American-born beauty contestant and actress in Hong Kong
- Mandy Clark (born 1982), American voice actress
- Mandy Cohen, American physician and Director of the U.S. Centers for Disease Control and Prevention
- Mandy Colleran (born 1962), British comedian and disability arts activist
- Mandy Coon, American fashion designer
- Mandy Cronin (born 1980), American ice hockey player and manager
- Mandy Cunningham (born 1964), Northern Ireland lawn bowler
- Mandy Davies (born 1966), British Olympic field hockey player
- Mandy Edwards (born 1982), Australian netball player
- Mandy Eißing, German politician
- Mandy Emmrich (born 1980), German rower
- Mandy Fisher (born 1962), English snooker and billiards player
- Mandie Fletcher (born 1954), English television and film director
- Mandy Foot, Australian children's writer and illustrator
- Mandy Ford (born 1961), British Anglican priest
- Mandy François-Elie (born 1989), French Paralympic athlete
- Mandy Giblin (born 1974), Australian runner
- Mandy Gieler (born 1987), German Wine Queen 2010/2011
- Mandy Ginsberg, American businesswoman and manager
- Mandie Godliman (born 1973), English Test cricketer
- Mandy Goh (born 1935), Singaporean police officer
- Mandy Gonzalez, American stage actress
- Mandy Greenfield, American artistic director
- Mandy Gull-Masty (born 1980), Canadian politician
- Mandy Gunasekara, American environmental attorney
- Mandy Haase (born 1982), German Olympic field hockey player
- Mandy Haberman (born 1956), British inventor and entrepreneur
- Mandy Haggith, English poet, author and activist
- Mandy Hering (born 1984), German handball player
- Mandy Horsepool (born 1959), British speed skater
- Mandy Horvath (born 1993), American bi-lateral above knee amputee
- Mandy Huydts (born 1969), Dutch singer and voice actress
- Mandy Ingber (born 1968), American actress
- Mandy Islacker (born 1988), German footballer
- Mandy Jacklin (born 1966), British lawn bowler
- Mandy James (born 1978), American rhythmic gymnast
- Mandy Jenkins (1980–2023), American journalist
- Mandy Jiroux (born 1987), American singer
- Mandy Jones (cyclist) (born 1962), British former racing cyclist
- Mandy Jones (politician), Welsh politician
- Mandy Keifetz (born 1966), American novelist, playwright, and poet
- Mandy Kilmartin, American politician
- Mandy Kimmons (born 1984), American politician
- Mandy Kornet (born 1985), Dutch cricketer
- Mandy Laddish (born 1992), American soccer player
- Mandy Lauderdale (born 1979), American singer
- Mandy Leach (born 1979), Zimbabwean Olympic swimmer
- Mandy Lemaire (1980–1991), American murder victim
- Mandy Leon (born 1992), American professional wrestler
- Mandy Lieu (born 1985), Malaysian-American actress
- Mandy Lindsay, American politician
- Mandy Lindsay (Scottish politician), Scottish politician
- Mandy Lowe (born 1970), English footballer
- Mandy Mango, American drag performer and registered nurse
- Mandy Mangru (born 1999), West Indian cricketer
- Mandy Marahimin, Indonesian film producer
- Mandy Marchak (born 1984), Canadian rugby union player
- Mandy Marquardt (born 1991), American track cyclist
- Mandy Martin (1952–2021), Australian artist
- Mandy Mayhem, New Zealand local politician and performer
- Mandy Maywood (born 1974), Australian Paralympic swimmer
- Mandy McCartin (born 1958), British artist
- Mandy McElhinney (born 1970), Australian actress
- Mandy McGlynn (born 1998), American soccer player
- Mandy Minella (born 1985), Luxembourgish professional tennis player
- Mandy Mohamed (born 2000), Dutch-Egyptian artistic gymnast
- Mandy Morgan (tennis) (born 1953), Australian tennis player
- Mandy Morgan (born 1955), New Zealand feminist psychology academic
- Mandy Mulder (born 1987), Dutch champion sailor
- Mandy Musgrave (born 1986), American actress and singer
- Mandy Nicholson (born 1968), British field hockey player
- Mandy Niklaus (born 1956), German fencer
- Mandy Nolan (born 1967), Australian political candidate, writer, performer, and actor
- Mandy Powers Norrell (born 1973), American politician
- Mandy O'Donnell (born 1989), Scottish lawn and indoor bowler
- Mandy Ord (born 1974), Australian comic artist
- Mandy Parnell, British audio mastering engineer
- Mandy Payne (born 1964), British painter
- Mandy Planert (born 1975), German slalom canoer
- Mandy Price, American attorney
- Mandy Quadrio, Australian artist
- Mandy Rain (born 1993), American singer-songwriter
- Mandy Rose (born 1990), American professional wrestler
- Mandy Rossouw (died 2013), South African journalist, political analyst and author
- Mandy M. Roth, American novelist
- Mandy Salomon, Australian comedian
- Mandy Sanghera, British human rights activist
- Mandy Santos, Spanish singer-songwriter
- Mandy Sayer (born 1963), Australian writer
- Mandy Sellars (born 1975), British woman possibly afflicted by Proteus syndrome
- Mandy Abou Shoak (born 1989), Swiss human rights activist, author and politician
- Mandy Simons, American linguist
- Mandy Stadtmiller (born 1975), American writer, comedienne and newspaper columnist
- Mandy Steele, American politician
- Mandy Stein (born 1975), American film producer and director
- Mandy Takhar (born 1987), British model and actress
- Mandy Tam (actress) (born 2000), Hong Kong actress and model
- Mandy Tam (politician) (born 1957), Hong Kong politician, tax advisor and newspaper columnist
- Mandy Telford (born 1976), British trade unionist
- Mandy Van Deven (born 1980), American feminist writer and activist
- Mandy Vaughn, American aeronautical engineer
- Mandy Versteegt (born 1990), Dutch footballer
- Mandy Walker (born 1963), Australian cinematographer
- Mandy Wei (born 1984), Taiwanese actress
- Mandy Wilkinson (born 1970), British painter
- Mandy Wong (born 1982), Hong Kong actress
- Mandy Wötzel (born 1973), German champion figure skater
- Mandy Wright (born 1977), American educator and politician
- Mandy Zieren (born 1978), Australian bodybuilder

=== Male ===
- Mandy Juruni (born 1982), Ugandan basketball coach
- Mandy Kane, Australian rock musician
- Mandy Sekiguchi (born 1991), American-Japanese dancer, rapper and actor
- Mandy Yachad (born 1960), South African cricketer and field hockey player

== Nickname ==
=== Female ===
- Amanda "Mandy" Barnett (born 1975), American country music singer
- Amanda "Mandy" Chessell (born c. 1965), British computer scientist
- Amanda "Mandy" Cavan (née Clemens) (born 1978), American soccer player
- Margaretha "Mandy" de Jongh (born 1961), Dutch taekwondo champion
- Miranda "Mandy" Downes (1950–1985), American screenwriter
- Amanda "Mandy" Drennan (born 1988), Australian Paralympic swimmer
- Amanda Lee Duffy (born 1992) known as Mandy Lee, the lead singer of MisterWives
- Miranda "Mandy" Freeman (born 1995), American soccer player
- Madeleine "Mandy" Grunwald (born 1958), American political strategist
- Amanda "Mandy" Hager (born 1960), New Zealand children's book author
- Amanda "Mandy" Harvey (born 1988), American deaf jazz musician
- Amanda "Mandy" Johnstone (born 1972), Australian politician
- Samantha "Mandy" Joye, American oceanographer
- Amanda "Mandy" Loots (born 1976), South African Olympic swimmer
- Carmen "Mandy" Miller (born 1944), British actress, child star of the 1952 film Mandy
- Amanda "Mandy" Moore (born 1984), American pop singer
- Samantha "Mandy" Moore (born 1976), American dancer and choreographer
- Marilyn "Mandy" Rice-Davies (1944–2014), British model
- Amanda "Mandy" Smith (born 1970), British pop singer, model and actress
- Amanda "Mandy" Barker (née Smith) (born 1972), New Zealand Olympic field hockey player
- Amanda "Mandy" Ventrice (born 1985), American recording artist

=== Male ===
- Armando "Mandy" Alvarez (born 1994), American professional baseball player and infielder
- Mandy Brooks (1897–1976), American professional baseball player
- Steve "Mandy" Hill (1940–2010), British footballer
- Peter "Mandy" Mandelson (born 1953), British Labour politician
- Armand "Mandy" Meyer (born 1960), Swiss guitarist
- Norman "Mandy" Mitchell-Innes (1914–2006), English cricketer
- Mandel "Mandy" Patinkin (born 1952), American actor
- Armando "Mandy" Romero (born 1967), American baseball player

== Fictional characters ==
- Mandy, a professional assassin in the American TV series 24
- Mandy, in the American animated TV series The Grim Adventures of Billy & Mandy
- Mandy, recurring character and villainess in the French and Canadian animated TV series Totally Spies!
- Mandy Carter, in the British TV series Ackley Bridge
- Mandy Carter, titular character in the British TV series Mandy
- Mandy Dingle, in the British TV series Emmerdale
- Mandy Hampton, in the American TV series The West Wing
- Mandy Hutchinson, in the British TV series Hollyoaks
- Mandy Salter, in the British TV series EastEnders
- Mandy, a mirror character in Phineas and Ferb.

== See also ==
- Mandy (disambiguation)
- Maddie
- Maddy (surname)
- Mady
