= Mand =

Mand may refer to:

== Places ==
- Mánd, a village in Szabolcs-Szatmár-Bereg county, Hungary
- Mand (village), a village in Madhya Pradesh, India
- Mand, Iran (disambiguation), two villages in Iran
- Mand (Kech District), a town in Balochistan, Pakistan
- Mand, West Virginia, United, States an unincorporated community
- Mand River, a river in India

== People with the surname ==
- Andreas Mand (born 1959), German writer
- Mänd, an Estonian surname

== Other uses ==
- Mand (psychology), B. F. Skinner's term for a verbal operant
- Mand (singing style), a style of folk music in Rajasthan, India

== See also ==
- Manda (disambiguation)
- Mande (disambiguation)
- Mando (disambiguation)
- Mandy (disambiguation)
- Mandi (disambiguation)
