= Mandinka =

Mandinka, Mandika, Mandinkha, or Mandinko may refer to:

- Mandinka people of West Africa
  - Mandingo people of Sierra Leone
- Mandinka language
- Samorian State, also known as the Mandinka Empire
- "Mandinka" (song), by Sinead O'Connor from her 1987 album The Lion and the Cobra

== See also ==
- Malinke (disambiguation)
- Mande (disambiguation)
- Manding (disambiguation)
- Mandingo (disambiguation)
