= Amanda (disambiguation) =

Amanda is a feminine given name.

Amanda or AMANDA may also refer to:

== Places ==
- Amanda Bay, Princess Elizabeth Land, Antarctica
- Amanda Township, Allen County, Ohio
- Amanda Township, Fairfield County, Ohio
  - Amanda, Ohio, a village in the township
- Amanda Township, Hancock County, Ohio
- Amanda (crater), a crater on Venus
- 725 Amanda, an asteroid

== Film and television ==
- Amanda (TV program), a 1940s American variety television series
- Amanda (Chilean TV series), a 2016 telenovela
- Amanda's, a short-lived 1983 situation comedy TV show based on Fawlty Towers
- The Amanda Show, a comedy/variety television program
- Amanda (2009 film), a film by Steve Marra
- Amanda (2018 film), a French drama film directed by Mikhaël Hers
- Amanda (2022 film), a film by Carolina Cavalli
- Amanda Award, a Norwegian film award

== Music ==
- Amanda (singer), Swedish pop singer
- "Amanda" (Boston song), a 1986 song by Boston
- "Amanda" (Don Williams song), a 1979 hit for Waylon Jennings and also popularized by Don Williams
- "Amanda" (Craig McLachlan song), a 1990 song by Craig McLachlan and Check 1-2
- "Amanda" (Jimmy Jansson song), from Melodifestivalen 2007
- Amanda (album), a 1985 album by Brazilian jazz artist Eliane Elias and trumpeter Randy Brecker
- "Amanda", a 2012 song by Green Day from ¡Tre!
- "Amanda", a 1971 song by Steve Peregrin Took, recorded by his band Shagrat and released as a posthumous single in 1990

== AMANDA ==
- Antarctic Muon And Neutrino Detector Array
- Amanda (software), Unix-based backup utility

== Other uses ==
- Amanda (novel), a 1984 novel by Candice F. Ransom
- Amanda (gastropod), a member of the nudibranch family
- Amanda (orchid), a subgenus of Masdevallia orchids
- List of storms named Amanda, tropical cyclones
- Operation Amanda, a 1994 United Nations Protection Force mission in Bosnia and Herzegovina
- USS Amanda, a bark in the Union Navy during the American Civil War

== See also ==
- Ananda (disambiguation) – similar spelling
- Manda (disambiguation)
- Mandy (disambiguation)
