= Sabzi =

Sabzi (Persian: سبزی, literally "greenness; greens") may refer to:

== People ==
- Sabzi (musician), American hip-hop musician
- Sabzi (artist), Iranian abstract impressionist painter

== Places ==
- Sabz Burj, Nizamuddin, a monument in New Delhi, India
- Sabzi, Bagh-e Malek, a village in Khuzestan Province, Iran
- Sabzi, Izeh, a village in Khuzestan Province, Iran
- Sabzi, Shushtar, a village in Khuzestan Province, Iran
- Sabzi, West Azerbaijan, a village in West Azerbaijan Province, Iran

== Culinary uses ==
- In Indian cuisine, a vegetable cooked in gravy, also spelled sabji
- Sabzi khordan, in Iranian cuisine, referring to vegetable greens as well as herbs and other vegetables
- Ghormeh sabzi, a popular Iranian dish considered the national dish of Iran

== See also ==
- Sabz (disambiguation)
- Sabzi Mandi (disambiguation)
