= Mandaic =

Mandaic may refer to:

- Mandaic language
- Mandaic alphabet
  - Mandaic (Unicode block)

== See also ==
- Mandean (disambiguation)
