= Manda =

Manda may refer to:

== Places ==
- Kafr Manda, Arab town in the Lower Galilee
- Manda Upazila, an upazila in the Division of Rajshahi, Bangladesh
- Manda, a former union council incorporated into Dhaka South City Corporation in Dhaka, Bangladesh
- Manda, Kale, a village in Burma
- Manda, Guinea, a town in the Labé Region
- Manda, Jammu, India, a village
- Manda (zamindari), an erstwhile feudal estate in India, near Allahabad
- Manda (Tanzanian ward), an administrative ward in Dodoma Region, Tanzania
- Manda, Missouri, a ghost town in the United States
- Manda National Park, Chad
- Manda Island, Lamu Archipelago, Kenya
- Manda, a village in Tillabéri Region, Niger, site of the 2025 Manda massacre

== People ==
- Manda people, an ethnic and linguistic group in southern Tanzania
- Manda (name), a list of people with the given name or surname

== Fictional characters ==
- Manda Best, in the soap opera EastEnders
- Manda (kaiju), a dragon-based kaiju that appears in Japanese monster films
- Manda, a giant snake in the Naruto manga series

== Other uses ==
- Manda (beetle), a genus of insects in the family Staphylinidae
- Beth manda, a place of worship for followers of Mandaeism
- Manda (Mandaeism), the concept of gnosis or spiritual knowledge in Mandaeism
- Manda language (disambiguation), multiple languages
- Manda (goddess), a Hindu deity

== See also ==
- Mandar (disambiguation)
- Ibn Manda (died 1004/5), Isfahani Sunni Hadith scholar
- Kafr Manda, an Israeli-Arab town in the Lower Galilee, near Nazareth
- Manda Formation, a geologic formation in Tanzania
- Amanda (disambiguation)
- Mandau (disambiguation)
- Mande (disambiguation)
