= Sanghera =

Sanghera may refer to:

== Places ==
- Sanghera (village), a village in Punjab, India

== People ==
- Jasvinder Sanghera (born 1965), British activist
- Mandy Sanghera, British human rights activist
- Sathnam Sanghera (born 1976), British journalist
- Sukh Sanghera, Canadian film and music video director
