= Mando =

Mando refers to:

- Mandø, one of the Danish Wadden Sea islands
- Mando (singer), a Greek singer
- Mando (music), a Goan (Indian) musical form
- Mando Diao, Swedish garage rock band.
- Mando Corporation, a Korean automotive parts manufacturer
- Mando Fresko, American radio personality (Power 106 FM), TV host, actor and club DJ
- Mandolin, in colloquial English
- Mandopop, popular music in Mandarin Chinese
- Mandarin Chinese, the official language of China, Taiwan and Singapore; or all people who speak Mandarin as a group
- The Mandalorian (character), eponymous character from the Star Wars series

== People ==
- Abdullah Mando, Syrian footballer
- Fawaz Mando, Syrian footballer
- Iyad Mando, Syrian footballer
- Michael Mando, Canadian film and television actor

== See also ==
- Mand (disambiguation)
