= Malinke =

Malinke or Malinké may refer to:

- Kassonke language
- Kita Maninka language, also known as Central Malinke
- Mali Empire
- Mandinka people
  - Mandingo people of Sierra Leone
- Maninka language

== See also ==
- Mandingo (disambiguation)
- Mandinka (disambiguation)
- Manding (disambiguation)
- Mande (disambiguation)
