= Quadrio =

Quadrio may refer to:

== People ==
- Alberto Quadrio Curzio (born 1937), Italian economist
- Carolyn Quadrio, Australian psychiatrist
- Francesco Saverio Quadrio (1695 – 1756), Italian scholar
- Mandy Quadrio, Australian artist

== Other uses ==
- Quadrio (Prague), complex in Prague
