= Brisley (surname) =

Brisley is a surname. Notable people with the surname include:

- Holly Brisley, Australian actor and television personality
- Joyce Lankester Brisley, English writer
- Richard Brisley
- Shaun Brisley, English footballer
- Stuart Brisley (born 1933), British artist
- Terry Brisley (born 1950), English footballer
