= Manda language =

Manda may be:

- Manda language (Australia), an Aboriginal language of Australia
- Manda language (India), a Dravidian language spoken in the state of Odisha, India
- Manda language (Tanzania), a Bantu language of Tanzania
- the Manda dialect of the Venda language, a Bantu language of South Africa and Zimbabwe

== See also ==
- Manda (disambiguation)
