= Sabz =

Sabz or Sabez (Persian: سبز) may refer to:

- Sabz, East Azerbaijan, Iran
- Sabz, Sistan and Baluchestan, Iran

== See also ==
- Sabzi (disambiguation)
