= Tazlina, Alaska =

Tazlina Tezdlen Na’
- CDP
- Location within the state of Alaska
- Coordinates: 62°2′57″N 145°24′55″W
- Country: United States
- State: Alaska
- Census Area: Copper River

Government
  - State senator: Mike Cronk (R)
  - State rep.: Rebecca Schwanke (R)

Area
  - Total: 9.07 sq mi (23.50 km^{2})
  - Land: 8.22 sq mi (21.29 km^{2})
  - Water: 0.85 sq mi (2.21 km^{2})
- Elevation: 2,418 ft (737 m)

Population (2020)
  - Total: 244
  - Density: 29.7/sq mi (11.46/km^{2})
- Time zone: UTC-9 (Alaska (AKST))
  - Summer (DST): UTC-8 (AKDT)
- ZIP code: 99588
- Area code: 907
- FIPS code: 02-75480
- GNIS feature ID: 1410694

Tazlina /tæzˈliːnə/ (Tezdlen Na’ in Ahtna Athabascan) is a census-designated place (CDP) in the Copper River Census Area, Alaska, United States. At the 2020 census the population was 244, down from 297 in 2010.

== Geography ==
Tazlina is located at 62°2′57″N 145°24′55″W (62.049082, -145.415224).

According to the United States Census Bureau, the CDP has a total area of 9.07 square miles (23.5 km^{2}), of which, 8.22 square miles (21.3 km^{2}) of it is land and 0.85 square miles (2.2 km^{2}) of it (9.37%) is water.

== Demographics ==
Historical population
Census	Pop.	Note	%±
1980	31		—
1990	247		696.8%
2000	149		−39.7%
2010	297		99.3%
2020	244		−17.8%
U.S. Decennial Census

Tazlina first appeared on the 1980 U.S. Census as a census-designated place (CDP). In 1990, it lost that designation and was reclassified as an unincorporated Alaskan Native Village Statistical Area (ANVSA). In 2000, it regained its status as a census-designated place (CDP). The former CDP of Copperville was consolidated into Tazlina effective as of the 2010 census.

As of the census of 2000, there were 149 people, 59 households, and 37 families residing in the CDP. The population density was 22.7 inhabitants per square mile (8.8/km^{2}). There were 87 housing units at an average density of 13.2 per square mile (5.1/km^{2}). The racial makeup of the CDP was 69.13% White, 24.83% Native American, and 6.04% from two or more races. 2.68% of the population were Hispanic or Latino of any race.

There were 59 households, out of which 32.2% had children under the age of 18 living with them, 47.5% were married couples living together, 8.5% had a female householder with no husband present, and 35.6% were non-families. 28.8% of all households were made up of individuals, and 3.4% had someone living alone who was 65 years of age or older. The average household size was 2.53 and the average family size was 3.18.

In the CDP, the age distribution of the population shows 30.2% under the age of 18, 5.4% from 18 to 24, 33.6% from 25 to 44, 24.2% from 45 to 64, and 6.7% who were 65 years of age or older. The median age was 34 years. For every 100 females, there were 122.4 males. For every 100 females age 18 and over, there were 136.4 males.

The median income for a household in the CDP was $56,000, and the median income for a family was $57,917. Males had a median income of $42,500 versus $25,625 for females. The per capita income for the CDP was $23,992. There were 7.3% of families and 8.1% of the population living below the poverty line, including 14.9% of under eighteens and none of those over 64.

== History ==
=== Murder of Mandy Lemaire ===
On August 22, 1991, 11-year-old Tazlina resident Mandy Lemaire was reported missing by her parents, triggering a massive search by law enforcement and townspeople. Ten days later, a volunteer searcher found Lemaire's body in a wooded area. Authorities suspected 61-year-old retiree Charles Smithart of the murder when another local man, Dave DeForest, told police he had observed Smithart driving near Mandy's house on the day she went missing. Police and forensic investigators found considerable trace evidence in Smithart's truck that suggested Mandy's presence in the vehicle, and learned from Smithart's eldest daughter that he had raped her and her sisters when they were Lemaire's age.

In 1993, Smithart was tried for and convicted of first-degree kidnapping, first-degree sexual battery on a minor, and first-degree murder. He was sentenced to serve 114 years in prison. In 1999, the Alaska Supreme Court overturned Smithart's conviction, ruling that the lower court improperly denied his defense counsel the right to assert that prosecution witness Dave DeForest had committed the crime. All charges were automatically dismissed in 2000, after Smithart died of lung cancer in prison, awaiting a retrial.

Tazlina and the Lemaire murder were featured on the true-crime television series Forensic Files, in the season 8 episode "Sphere of Influence". The television network Investigation Discovery aired two shows about the murder; the series Ice Cold Killers, episode titled "Fear Thy Neighbor" aired in 2014; and the special "Vanished in Alaska" in 2018.
