= Mand, Iran =

Mand (Persian: مند) in Iran may refer to:

- Mand-e Bala
- Mand-e Sofla
