= Mandean =

Mandean or Mandaean may refer to:

- Mandaeism, a Gnostic religion
- Mandaeans, the ethnoreligious group who follow the Gnostic religion
- Mandean, the language family in West Africa known as the Mande languages

== See also ==
- Mandaic (disambiguation), the variety of Aramaic and its alphabet used by the Mandaeans
- Mande (disambiguation)
