= Mandie (disambiguation) =

Mandie is a series of children's books.

Mandie may also refer to:

- Philip Mandie (born 1942), judge of the Supreme Court of Victoria
- Mandie Fletcher (born 1954), British television and film director
- Mandie Godliman (born 1973), English former cricketer
- Mandie Landry, American politician
- A nickname for the recreational drug Methaqualone

== See also ==
- Mandle, surname
- Mandy (disambiguation)
