= Manding language =

Manding may be:

- One of the Manding languages
- Specifically the Mandinka language

== See also ==
- Manding (disambiguation)
