= Subzi Mandi =

Subzi Mandi (vegetable market in Hindi) may refer to:

- Subzi Mandi railway station, in Delhi, India
- Subzi Mandi metro station, near the railway station in Delhi, India
- Sabzi Mandi (Karachi), a bazaar

== See also ==
- Sabzi (disambiguation)
- Mandi (disambiguation)
