= Mandy =

Mandy or Mandie may refer to:

== People ==
- Mandy (given name), a female given name and nickname
- Alexandru Mandy (1914–2005), Romanian composer
- Iván Mándy (1918–1995), Hungarian writer
- Mark Mandy (born 1972), Irish retired high jumper
- Philip Mandie (born 1942), a former judge on the Supreme Court of Victoria, Australia

== Books ==
- Mandy, the title character of Handy Mandy in Oz (1937), in the "Oz Books" series by Frank Baum and his successors
- Mandy (comics), a British girls' comic published 1967–1991
- Mandie, a series of children's books written by Lois Gladys Leppard
- Mandy, a four-part children's book written by Julie Andrews, originally published in 1971 under the pen name Kim Edwards

== Music ==
- Mandy (album), British singer Mandy Smith's 1988 debut album
- "Mandy" (Irving Berlin song), a 1919 song written by Irving Berlin
- "Mandy" (Barry Manilow song), a 1974 version of "Brandy" by Scott English
- "Mandy" (Jonas Brothers song), a 2005 song by the American boy band Jonas Brothers

== TV and film ==
- Mandy (1952 film), a British drama about a deaf child
- Mandy (2018 film), an action/horror film starring Nicolas Cage
- Mandy (TV series), British comedy starring Diane Morgan
- "Mandy" (This Country), a 2017 television episode

== Other uses ==
- "Mandy", a street name for the drug MDMA, better known as ecstasy
- "Randy Mandy", nickname for the 2010 Red Bull RB6 Formula One racing car, given to it by driver, Sebastian Vettel

== See also ==
- Milly-Molly-Mandy, a series of children's books by Joyce Lankester Brisley
- Mandi (disambiguation)
