= Manda National Park =

National park in Chad

- IUCN category II (national park)
- Location within Chad
- Location: Chad
- Coordinates: 9°17′39″N 17°56′25″E
- Area: 1,140 km^{2} (440 mi^{2})
- Established: 1969

Manda National Park is a national park in Chad. It is located in southern Chad near the town of Sarh and borders Chari River on the east and the Sarh-Ndjamena road on the south=west. The park occupies more than 113,000 ha and was established in 1965, having been a faunal reserve since 1953.

== Wildlife ==
Mammals in the park include lions and other large animals that can only be seen during the dry season. African wild dogs are present. The park was initially created for the protection of the giant eland but, as with the African elephant, this species disappeared from the park by the end of the 1980s.

The park has been designated an Important Bird Area (IBA) by BirdLife International. Some of the birds found in the park are yellow penduline tit, Senegal eremomela, blackcap babbler, white-collared starling, bush petronia, rufous cisticola, Gambaga flycatcher and red-faced pytilia, among many others.
