= Sanghera (village) =

- village
- Location in Punjab, India Sanghera (India)
- Coordinates: 30.3986°N 75.5614°E
- Country: India
- State: Punjab
- District: Barnala

Population (2011)
  - Total: 17,890

Languages
  - Official: Punjabi
- Time zone: UTC+5:30 (IST)
- Vehicle registration: PB-19
- Nearest city: Barnala
- Lok Sabha constituency: Barnala
- Avg. summer temperature: 30–45 °C (86–113 °F)
- Avg. winter temperature: 00–20 °C (32–68 °F)

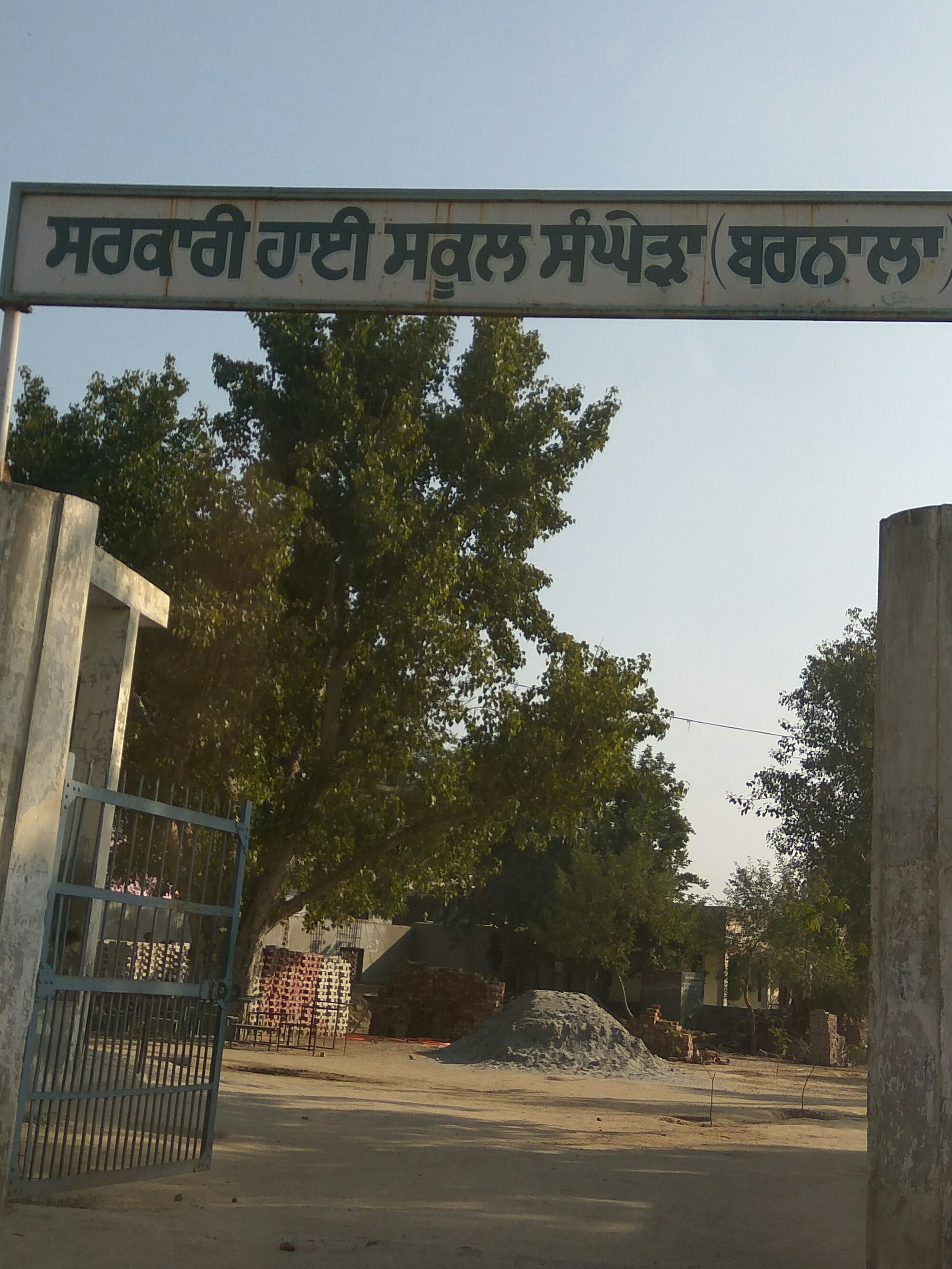

Sanghera is a village in Barnala district in the Indian state of Punjab. It is situated in Barnala Block of the district 5 km away from Barnala, which is both district & sub-district headquarter of Sanghera village. Sanghera is widely known for its water irrigation system and It's Mandir (Mai Rani) And Gurdwara which are situated at same site there is an Art's and commerce College outside the village Guru Gobind Singh College Sanghera

== Demographics ==
According to Census 2011, Sanghera 's population is 992. Out of this, 550 are males whereas the females count 442 here. This village has 94 children in the age group of 0–6 years. Out of this 55 are boys and 39 are girls.
