= Sabzi, Shoushtar =

Sabzi سبزي
- Village
- Location within Iran
- Coordinates: 31°50′08″N 48°59′26″E
- Country: Iran
- Province: Khuzestan
- County: Shushtar
- Bakhsh: Central
- Rural District: Miyan Ab

Population (2006)
  - Total: 126
- Time zone: UTC+3:30 (IRST)
  - Summer (DST): UTC+4:30 (IRDT)

Sabzi (Persian: سبزي, also Romanized as Sabzī; also known as Sūzī) is a village in Miyan Ab Rural District, in the Central District of Shushtar County, Khuzestan Province, Iran. At the 2006 census, its population was 126, in 24 families.
