= Mandi =

Mandi may refer to:

== Places ==
=== India ===
- Mandi River, a tributary of the Poonch River in Jammu and Kashmir
  - Mandi, Jammu and Kashmir, a town on the Mandi River in the Poonch district of Jammu and Kashmir
- Mandi, Himachal Pradesh, a city in Himachal Pradesh
  - Mandi State, former princely state
  - Mandi (Lok Sabha constituency)
  - Mandi (Vidhan Sabha constituency)
  - Mandi district, a district in Himachal Pradesh
- Mandi, Jalandhar, a village in Punjab
- Mandi, Uttar Pradesh, a village in Uttar Pradesh
- Mandi Dabwali, a city in Sirsa district, Haryana
- Mandi Gobindgarh, a town in Punjab
- Mandi, Phagi, village in Jaipur district, Rajasthan
- Mandi House, locality of Delhi, India; former residence of the Raja of Mandi State (Himachal Pradesh)
  - Mandi House metro station, on the Delhi Metro

=== Pakistan ===
- Mandi, Mirpur, a village in Azad Kashmir
- Mandi Bahauddin, a town in Punjab
- Mandi Bahauddin District, a district in Punjab
- Heera Mandi, ('diamond market') a neighborhood of Lahore

== People ==
=== Given name ===
- Mandi Lampi (1988–2008), Finnish actress and singer
- Mandi Perkins, Canadian rock musician
- Armando Sosa Peña (born 1989), known as Mandi, Spanish football player
- Mandi Schwartz (1988–2011), Canadian ice hockey player
- Mandi Urbas (born 1982), German football player
- Mandi Gosling, sister of Ryan Gosling

=== Surname ===
- Aïssa Mandi (born 1991), Algerian football player
- Gyula Mándi (1899–1969), Hungarian football player and manager
- Imre Mándi (1916–1943), Hungarian boxer
- Nazanin Mandi (born 1986), American model, actress, and singer

== Other uses ==
- Mandi (bath), a method of bathing in Indonesia and Malaysia
- Mandi (1956 film), a Pakistani film
- Mandi (1983 film), a Hindi film by Shyam Benegal
- Mandi (food), a Yemeni meal popular in Arabia
- Mandi (legendary creature), a short-lived race from medieval bestiaries
- Mandi (Mandaeism), a place of worship for followers of Mandaeism
- Mandi tribe, an indigenous people of Western Australia
- Sabzi Mandi (disambiguation), a wholesale food market in South Asia

== See also ==
- Mand (disambiguation)
- Mande (disambiguation)
- Mandy (disambiguation)
- Mandeali, a Western Pahari (Indo-Aryan) language spoken in Mandi, Himachal Pradesh, India
