= Mandy Morgan =

New Zealand feminist psychology academic

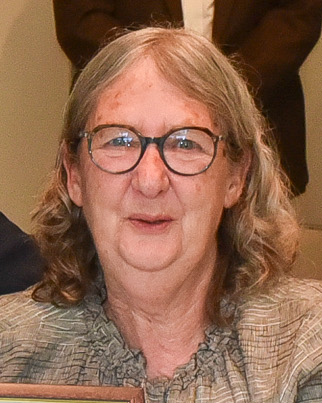
- Morgan in 2025
- Born: Catherine Amanda Morgan; 1955 (age 70–71)
- Education: Murdoch University
- Scientific career
- Workplaces: Massey University
- Thesis: Strange attractions : discourse, narrative and subjectivity in social psychology (1992)

Catherine Amanda Morgan (born 1955) is a New Zealand feminist psychology academic. As of 2019, she is a full professor at Massey University.

== Academic career ==
After a 1992 PhD titled 'Strange attractions : discourse, narrative and subjectivity in social psychology' at Murdoch University, Morgan moved to the Massey University, rising to full professor in 2013.

Morgan was an adviser to the Glenn Inquiry, but resigned from the troubled group in 2013.

== Selected works ==
- Kahu, Ella, and Mandy Morgan. "A critical discourse analysis of New Zealand government policy: Women as mothers and workers." In Women's Studies International Forum, vol. 30, no. 2, pp. 134–146. Pergamon, 2007.
- Bürgelt, Petra T., Mandy Morgan, and Regina Pernice. "Staying or returning: Pre‐migration influences on the migration process of German migrants to New Zealand." Journal of Community & Applied Social Psychology 18, no. 4 (2008): 282–298.
- Kahu, Ella, and Mandy Morgan. "Weaving cohesive identities: New Zealand women talk as mothers and workers." Kōtuitui: New Zealand Journal of Social Sciences Online 2, no. 2 (2007): 55–73.
- Morgan, Mandy, and Leigh Coombes. "Subjectivities and silences, mother and woman: Theorizing an experience of silence as a speaking subject." Feminism & Psychology 11, no. 3 (2001): 361–375.
- O'Neill, Damian, and Mandy Morgan. "Pragmatic post‐structuralism (I): participant observation and discourse in evaluating violence intervention." Journal of Community & Applied Social Psychology 11, no. 4 (2001): 263–275.
