= Manda, Missouri =

Extinct town in the US state of Missouri

Coordinates: 38.3942135°N 91.5121052°W

Manda is an extinct town in Gasconade County, in the U.S. state of Missouri.

An early variant name was "Zoar". A post office called Zoar was established in 1898, the name was changed to Manda in 1901 and the post office closed in 1908. An early postmaster gave the community the first name of his daughter, Manda Tschappler.
