= List of storms named Amanda =

The name Amanda has been used for three tropical cyclones in the Eastern Pacific Ocean and two in the Southern Hemisphere.

Eastern Pacific Ocean:

- Hurricane Amanda (2014), a Category 4 hurricane that became the strongest Eastern Pacific hurricane in the month of May.
- Tropical Storm Amanda (2020), a short-lived tropical storm that made landfall in southeastern Guatemala. Its remnants spawned Tropical Storm Cristobal in the Gulf of Mexico.
- Tropical Storm Amanda (2026), weak tropical storm that stayed at sea

South-West Indian Ocean:

- Cyclone Amanda (1963), stayed well out to sea to the east of Madagascar.

Australian region:

- Cyclone Amanda (1965), formed in the Arafura Sea and drifted across the Northern Territory and Western Australia.

== See also ==
- Hurricane Amanda, an 1863 Atlantic storm which was retroactively given the same name.
