= Sabzi, Izeh =

Sabzi سبزي
- Village
- Location within Iran
- Coordinates: 31°47′58″N 50°10′21″E
- Country: Iran
- Province: Khuzestan
- County: Izeh
- Bakhsh: Dehdez
- Rural District: Donbaleh Rud-e Shomali

Population (2006)
  - Total: 109
- Time zone: UTC+3:30 (IRST)
  - Summer (DST): UTC+4:30 (IRDT)

Sabzi (Persian: سبزي, also Romanized as Sabzī) is a village in Donbaleh Rud-e Shomali Rural District, Dehdez District, Izeh County, Khuzestan Province, Iran. At the 2006 census, its population was 109, in 19 families.
