= Mand (Madhya Pradesh) =

Village in Madhya Pradesh, India

Coordinates: 32°55′N 75°00′E

Mand is a small village of Mandla district, Madhya Pradesh, India. This village is about 30 km from main city Mandla and in National Highway 30(Old 12A).

== Demographics ==
As of 2011 India census Mand has a population of 2029. Males constitute 52.36% of the population.

== Educational institutes ==
- Govt. High School Mand.
- Govt. Middle School Mand.
- Saraswati Shishu Mandir Mand.
- Govt. Boys' Primary School Mand.
- Govt. Girls' Primary School Mand.

== Temples ==
- Shri Shitala Mata Mandir,
- Shri Sankatmochan Hanumaan Mandir,
- Shri Sai Baba Mandir,
- Shri Mahadev Mandir.
- Shri Shani Dev Mandir,
- Shri Siddh Baba Mandir
- Shri Siddh Tekri

== Climate ==
Mand Village

Climate chart (precipitation, max. and min. temperature)
J	F	M	A	M	J	J	A	S	O	N	D
41 25 18	32 24 17	31 30 25	40 35 30	46 47 38	66 45 38	73 42 35	57 38 32	54 42 32	39 41 31	50 33 28	50 28 21
- █ Average max. and min. temperatures in °C
- █ Precipitation totals in mm
Imperial conversion
J	F	M	A	M	J	J	A	S	O	N	D
1.6 77 64	1.3 75 63	1.2 86 77	1.6 95 86	1.8 117 100	2.6 113 100	2.9 108 95	2.2 100 90	2.1 108 90	1.5 106 88	2 91 82	2 82 70
- █ Average max. and min. temperatures in °F
- █ Precipitation totals in inches
