= Amanda (crater) =

Crater on Venus

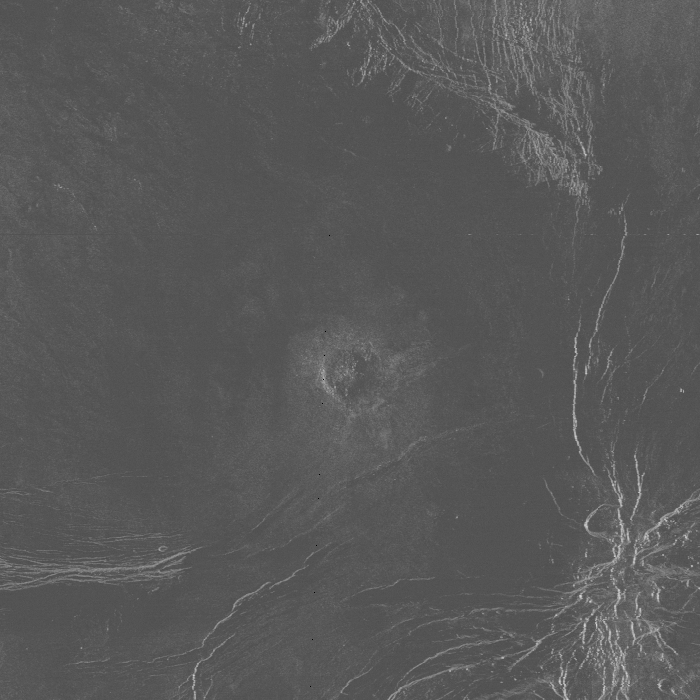
- Location: Venus
- Coordinates: 29.2° S 94.5° E
- Diameter: 12.5 km
- Eponym: Latin first name

Amanda is an impact crater on the surface of Venus, with a diameter of 12.5 km. It has a continuous ejecta radius of 20.6 km.

== Naming ==
Craters on Venus are named after deceased women who made fundamental contributions to their field. Craters under 20 km are named after common female names.

Its name derives from Latin first name of Amanda. It was accepted and adopted by the International Astronomical Union in the year of 1997.

Amanda was originally named as Lida. The name Lida is a first name from Greek.
