= Mando Fresko =

- Mando Fresko featured in Forbes
- Born: Armando Ponce Montes; February 25, 1987 (age 39); Los Angeles, California, U.S.
- Occupations: Television Host, Radio Personality, Actor, DJ and Entrepreneur
- Years active: 2006 — present

Mando Fresko (born Armando Ponce Montes; February 25, 1987) born in Los Angeles raised in South Gate, California to a Mexican family is an American Radio Host, DJ, Actor, Television Host and Entrepreneur. At the early age of 14, he began to deejay his high school's talent shows and dances. He graduated from South Gate High School in South Gate, California.

In college, he had his first radio show where he attracted listeners from Australia, Puerto Rico, Japan; he crashed the station's server many times because so many people would log on at the same time. At the age of 18, his next move was to Los Angeles hip hop radio station Power 106 (KPWR FM), where he began in the promotions department and later made his way into becoming the youngest on-air radio personality in the station's history. Mando hosted every time slot from mornings to nights and has interviewed everyone from Kanye West to Will Ferrell. Mando's hit concert stages, entertaining crowds of over 20,000 people and DJs at popular night-clubs from Los Angeles to Paris to Tokyo. In 2019, he left Power 106 after a 15-year run with the hip hop station, bringing in over 2 million listeners daily. He continues as voice-over and endorser for radio commercials on the station.

In early 2007, Mando hit national television airwaves as host for "LATV LIVE" where he also attained the position of music coordinator for the LATV Networks, reaching over 86 million homes.

In 2008, he took the role of fashion designer. Mando Fresko collaborated with Internationally renowned clothing brand, Orisue and moved to athletic sportswear, collaborating with Nike in 2013. In 2009 Mando started DJing for the Grammy nominated, LMFAO (band). In late 2011, Mando joined MTV as a host and producer for Tr3s and MTV2.

Fall of 2019, Fresko kicked off the first Cali 93.9 (KLLI FM) morning show, as he became the host for "Cali Mornings." In 2020, he made the move to focus on his media and production company full-time. Hubwav Media currently creates content for brands like Nike, Facebook, Grammys, Pepsi and LVMH.

In December 2019, he was awarded the Key to The City in his hometown of Los Angeles and was honored as the grand marshal of the city's yearly holiday parade.

He attended Cerritos College's Television & Radio Program (WPMD). He currently resides in Los Angeles, California.
