= Mand-e Sofla =

Mand-e Sofla مندسفلي
- Village
- Location within Iran
- Coordinates: 27°10′00″N 59°36′00″E
- Country: Iran
- Province: Sistan and Baluchestan
- County: Dalgan
- Bakhsh: Jolgeh-ye Chah Hashem
- Rural District: Jolgeh-ye Chah Hashem

Population (2006)
  - Total: 598
- Time zone: UTC+3:30 (IRST)
  - Summer (DST): UTC+4:30 (IRDT)

Mand-e Sofla (Persian: مندسفلي, also Romanized as Mand-e Soflá; also known as Kontekī and Mand-e Pā’īn) is a village in Jolgeh-ye Chah Hashem Rural District, Jolgeh-ye Chah Hashem District, Dalgan County, Sistan and Baluchestan Province, Iran. At the 2006 census, its population was 598, in 125 families.
