= Mandaic (Unicode block) =

- Range: U+0840..U+085F (32 code points)
- Plane: BMP
- Scripts: Mandaic
- Major alphabets: Eastern Aramaic; Modern Mandaic
- Assigned: 29 code points
- Unused: 3 reserved code points

Unicode version history
- 6.0 (2010): 29 (+29)

Unicode documentation
- Code chart ∣ Web page

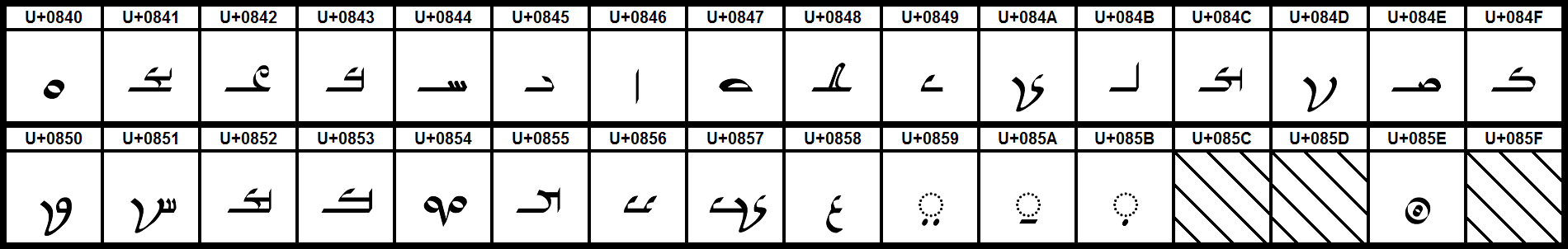
Graphical representation of the Mandaic Unicode block

Mandaic is a Unicode block containing characters of the Mandaic script used for writing the historic Eastern Aramaic, also called Classical Mandaic, and the modern Neo-Mandaic language.

== Block ==
Mandaic^{[1]}^{[2]} Official Unicode Consortium code chart (PDF)
	0	1	2	3	4	5	6	7	8	9	A	B	C	D	E	F
U+084x	ࡀ	ࡁ	ࡂ	ࡃ	ࡄ	ࡅ	ࡆ	ࡇ	ࡈ	ࡉ	ࡊ	ࡋ	ࡌ	ࡍ	ࡎ	ࡏ
U+085x	ࡐ	ࡑ	ࡒ	ࡓ	ࡔ	ࡕ	ࡖ	ࡗ	ࡘ	࡙	࡚	࡛			࡞	
Notes 1.As of Unicode version 17.0 2.Grey areas indicate non-assigned code points

== History ==
The following Unicode-related documents record the purpose and process of defining specific characters in the Mandaic block:

Version	Final code points (Note: Proposed code points and characters names may differ from final code points and names)	Count	L2 ID	WG2 ID	Document
6.0	U+0840..085B, 085E	29	L2/07-412	N3373	Everson, Michael (2008-01-18), Preliminary proposal to encode the Mandaic script in the BMP of the UCS
6.0	U+0840..085B, 085E	29	L2/08-270R	N3485R	Everson, Michael; Richmond, Bob (2008-08-04), Proposal for encoding the Mandaic script in the BMP of the UCS
6.0	U+0840..085B, 085E	29	L2/08-253R2		Moore, Lisa (2008-08-19), "Mandaic (B.15.1, C.11)", UTC #116 Minutes
6.0	U+0840..085B, 085E	29	L2/08-412	N3553 (pdf, doc)	Umamaheswaran, V. S. (2008-11-05), "M53.20", Unconfirmed minutes of WG 2 meeting 53
6.0	U+0840..085B, 085E	29	L2/10-413		Pournader, Roozbeh (2010-10-15), Joining types for Mandaic
6.0	U+0840..085B, 085E	29	L2/10-427		McGowan, Rick (2010-10-27), "ScriptExtensions.txt to mention Mandaic for U+0640 ARABIC TATWEEL", Comments on Public Review Issues (August 3, 2010 - October 27, 2010)
6.0	U+0840..085B, 085E	29	L2/10-416R		Moore, Lisa (2010-11-09), "Properties — Joining types for Mandaic", UTC #125 / L2 #222 Minutes
6.0	U+0840..085B, 085E	29	L2/14-194		Anderson, Deborah (2014-08-04), Feedback on Mandaic Shaping
6.0	U+0840..085B, 085E	29	L2/14-177		Moore, Lisa (2014-10-17), "Feedback on Mandaic Shaping (B.14.3)", UTC #140 Minutes
6.0	U+0840..085B, 085E	29	L2/20-044		Al-Sabti, Ardwan (2019-12-25), The Non-Joining U+0858 in the Mandaic Unicode Standard
6.0	U+0840..085B, 085E	29	L2/20-043		Al-Sabti, Ardwan (2020-01-03), The Non-Joining U+0856 in the Mandaic Unicode Standard
6.0	U+0840..085B, 085E	29	L2/20-046		Anderson, Deborah; Whistler, Ken; Pournader, Roozbeh; Moore, Lisa; Liang, Hai (2020-01-10), "5. Mandaic", Recommendations to UTC #162 January 2020 on Script Proposals
6.0	U+0840..085B, 085E	29	L2/20-049		Al-Sabti, Ardwan (2020-01-10), Mandaic KAD
6.0	U+0840..085B, 085E	29	L2/20-015R		Moore, Lisa (2020-05-14), "C.11.1, C.11.2, and C.11.3", Draft Minutes of UTC Meeting 162

== Mandaic typefaces ==
Mandaic typefaces have been developed by Ardwan Al-Sabti. Typefaces developed by Ardwan Al-Sabti include:

- Ardwan Mono (2010) is one of the first Mandaic typefaces. Designed for code editors and developers.
- Mandaicana (2011)
- Ardwan Brush (Bahram) (2015) is a cursive font based on the manuscripts of Ganzibra Bahram.
- Ardwan Script (2018), formerly called Ardwan Lidzbarski, is based on the Mandaic handwriting of Mark Lidzbarski. It was used in a critical edition of the Mandaean Book of John by Häberl & McGrath (2020).
- Ardwan Punch (Euting) (2019) is based on technical aspects of Julius Euting's 19th-century punch letters.
- Ardwan Deco (2020) is based on handwritten elements in Julius Euting's 19th-century punch letters.
- Ardwan Round (Drower) (2021) is based on the Mandaic handwriting of E. S. Drower.
- Ardwan Reed (RRC) (2022), based on the oldest Mandaic manuscripts in the RRC (the Rbai Rafid Collection of Mandaic manuscripts) and the most recent studies related to Mandaic typography by Ardwan Al-Sabti.
- Ardwan Sans Pro (2023) is designed to be a primary system font.
