= Murder of Mandy Lemaire =

1991 child murder in Alaska, United States

Mandy LeMaire
- Born: July 19, 1980; Anchorage, Alaska
- Disappeared: August 22, 1991
- Died: August 22, 1991 (aged 11); Tazlina, Alaska
- Cause of death: Homicide
- Body discovered: September 1, 1991

Amanda Lynn LeMaire (July 19, 1980 – August 22, 1991) was an 11-year-old girl from Tazlina, Alaska, who was murdered in 1991. She was last seen walking along a rural road near her home to meet a friend. Her body was discovered 10 days later, showing signs of sexual assault and fatal gunshot wounds. Charlie Smithart, a local man, was arrested and convicted of her murder, receiving a 114-year sentence. However, In 1999 the Alaska Supreme Court reversed the conviction. In December 2000, Charlie Smithart died in prison from lung cancer, having never faced his second trial.

== Disappearance ==
On Friday, August 22, 1991, 11-year-old Mandy left her home in Tazlina, Alaska, to meet a friend along a stretch of road between their houses. They had planned to walk back to Mandy’s house together to play.

When Mandy's friend arrived at the meeting spot, she found no sign of Mandy. After waiting for a while, the friend walked toward Mandy's house, hoping to meet her along the way, but there was still no trace of her. Concerned, Mandy's family began searching the surrounding area, including nearby trails and paths leading to the main road. When their efforts yielded no results, they contacted the police to report Mandy as missing.

== Investigation ==
As law enforcement conducted their search for Mandy, her family and the local community assisted, directing their focus on the nearby forest. They speculated that Mandy may have been startled by a moose and fled into the wilderness.

A sniffer dog was enlisted to assist in the search and tracked Mandy’s scent along the road to the point where she was supposed to meet her friend. However, the trail abruptly ended there.

On September 1, a group of searchers found Mandy’s body. She had been shot twice, once in the face and once in the head. Her arms showed signs of bruising, and there was a cut near her lip. It was later confirmed that Mandy had been sodomized by an inanimate object before being shot. Evidence also indicated that she had been bound with rope.

In November, authorities arrested 61-year-old Charlie Smithart, a retired pipeline worker, at his home in Copper Center. Smithart had participated in the community search for Mandy after her disappearance and was unusually interested in the search. He was charged with first-degree kidnapping, first-degree sexual assault and first-degree murder, He was booked into the Mat-Su Pre-Trial Facility in Palmer and held on $450,000 bail.

During the investigation, a local resident who knew Smithart, Dave DeForest told detectives that he had seen Smithart’s tan pickup truck minutes before Mandy's disappearance and near the area where Mandy had gone missing, raising suspicions about him. Later, one of Smithart’s cousins came forward, stating she had seen his truck about two hours after Mandy disappeared, near the location where her body was found. While she couldn’t confirm who was driving, she was certain it was Smithart’s vehicle. While she was testifying her sighting of the truck during the trial, Smithart said sarcastically as she left the witness stand, “Thanks, Cuz.”

A search warrant was obtained for Smithart’s truck, and investigators discovered evidence linking him to the crime, including two blonde hairs and traces from the truck’s mats that matched fibers found on Mandy’s clothing.

When confronted with the evidence, Smithart acted oddly, repeatedly asking investigators whether they had found any of Mandy’s hair, jewelry, or blood in his truck. He also made remarks about his attraction to girls as young as 11 or 12.

Further investigation revealed traces of iron flecks on Mandy’s clothing, believed to be from welding. Smithart, who was known to be a welder with a workshop at his home, was likely the source of those traces.

In addition, investigators spoke with one of Smithart’s adult daughters in California, who disclosed that her father had molested her as a child. She also revealed that her two sisters had been victims of his abuse.

Dave DeForest, the man who said he saw Smithart‘s truck near the crime scene, was a convicted felon who had moved to Alaska while on probation for attempted burglary in New York. DeForest had given a time card that suggested he was away from his workplace for a short errand around the same time he saw Smithart’s truck. But upon further investigation, it was found that he had submitted a different time card to his employer, stating he had been present at work the entire day on August 22.

A fellow prisoner testified that Smithart had confessed to him while both were awaiting trials. During the trial Smithart said Mandy never had been in his truck and that the blond hair found there likely was that of a friend’s son. He said that if he had killed the girl, he would have dumped the body in the fast-flowing Copper River, not in the woods near her home.

Ultimately, the jury convicted Smithart of Mandy Lemaire's murder. Smithart showed his outrage and was taken from the courtroom by guards and placed in an enclosed media booth while the jury was polled on its decision. Smithart was sentenced to 114 years in prison. However, in 1999, the Alaska Supreme Court overturned the conviction, ruling that the defense should have had more opportunity to challenge DeForest’s testimony and suggest that he might have been the actual killer.

Charlie Smithart died in December 2000 from lung cancer while still in prison, having never undergone a second trial.

== In popular culture ==
Mandy was featured on the true-crime television series Forensic Files, in the season 8 episode "Sphere of Influence". The television network Investigation Discovery aired two shows about the murder; the series Ice Cold Killers, episode titled "Fear Thy Neighbor" aired in 2014; and the special Vanished in Alaska in 2018.
