= Mandingo =

Mandingo may refer to:

== People ==
- Mandingo, a stereotype of African American men
- Mandinka people of West Africa, also known as Mandingo people
  - Mandingo people of Sierra Leone
- Manding languages
  - Mandinka language, a Manding language of West Africa, belonging to the Mande subgroup of the Niger-Congo language family
- Samorian State, also known as the Mandinka or Mandingo Empire
  - Mandingo Wars (1883–1898), between France and the Samorian State
- Mali Empire, also known as the Mandingo Empire

== Media ==
- Mandingo (novel), a bestselling novel published in 1957
- Mandingo (film), a 1975 film based on the eponymous 1957 novel
- Mandingo (play), a play by Jack Kirkland
- "Mandingo", a song by Wu-Tang Clan from their 2025 album Black Samson, the Bastard Swordsman

== Other use ==
- Mandingo Central Mosque

== See also ==
- Mandinka (disambiguation)
- Malinke (disambiguation)
- Manding (disambiguation)
- Mande (disambiguation)
- Django Unchained, a 2012 Quentin Tarantino film that depicts so-called "Mandingo fights"
