= Mandau (disambiguation) =

Mandau may refer to:

- Mandau River (Central Europe), a river in central Europe
- Mandau River (Indonesia), a river in northern Sumatra, Indonesia
- Mandau, a district of Bengkalis Regency, Riau province, Indonesia
- Mandau-class fast attack craft, a class of fast attack craft operated by the Indonesian Navy
- Mandau (knife), the traditional weapon of the Dayak people of Borneo

== See also ==
- Mandaue, a highly-urbanized city in Cebu, Philippines
