= Mandy Sanghera =

British human rights activist

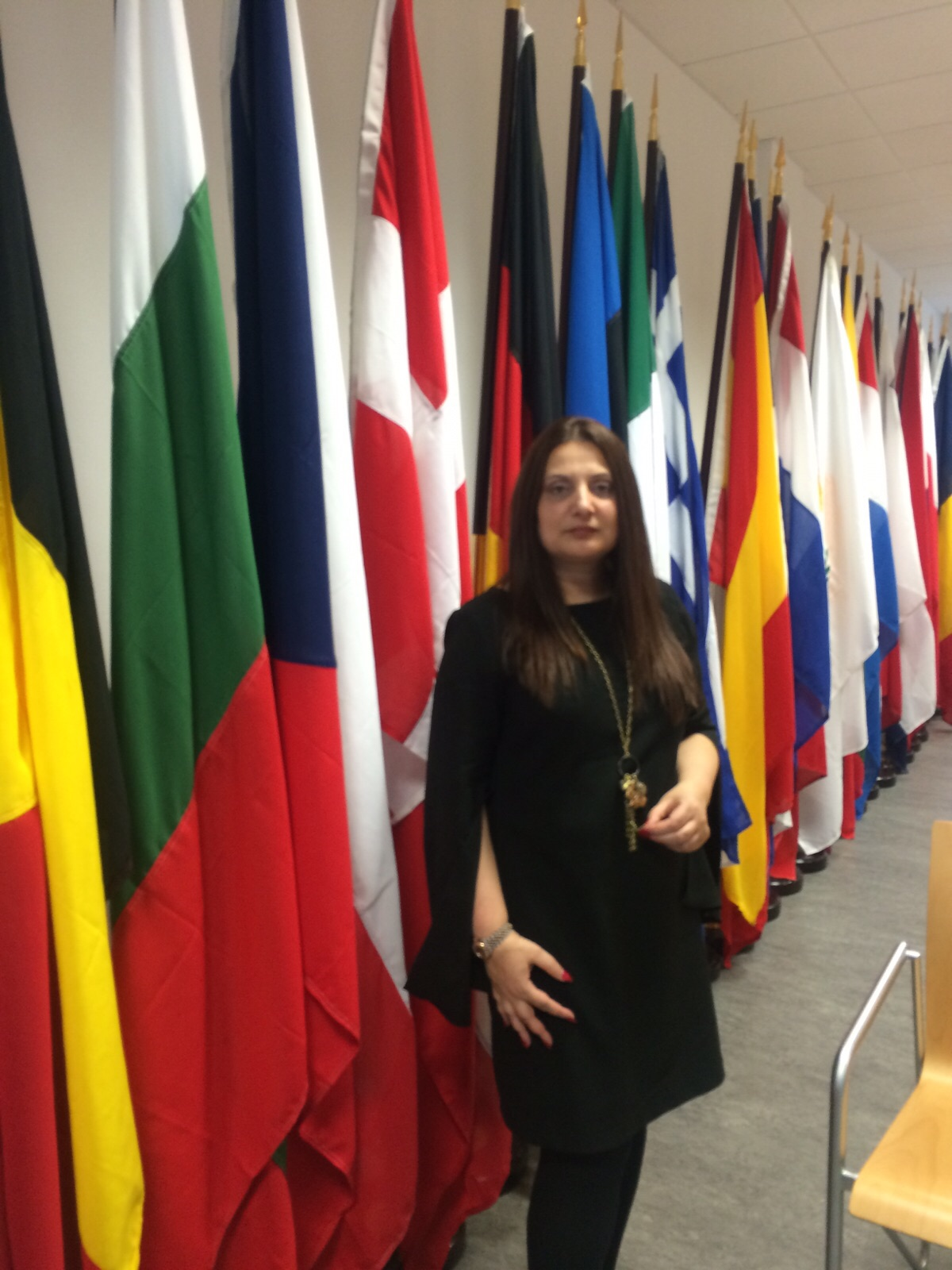
- Occupation: Human rights activist

Mandy Sanghera is an international human rights activist. Since 1990, she has been supporting victims and survivors of honour-based violence and cultural abuse such as female genital mutilation, forced marriages, faith-based abuse, and witchcraft.

== Activism and humanitarian work ==
As a human rights activist, Sanghera has worked in various areas focusing on cultural abuse and crimes. She has been involved in documentaries on themes such as witchcraft, forced marriages, incest, female genital mutilation, and “honour” killings.

Sanghera was involved in writing the guidelines on disability and HBV for the Forced Marriages Unit. Until 2018, she worked with the European Parliament on forced marriages, preparing a report based on the information from the 28 European Union Member States and the selected associated countries, and will be involved in the Goddard Child Abuse Inquiry. Sanghera is an ambassador and adviser for several charities and social groups such as Psychreg, and has supported over 200 disabled adults who have been forced into marriage. She was one of a panel of speakers at the United States House of Representatives and spoke about honour-based violence and cultural abuse. Sanghera was on the team that worked on the "My Marriage My Choice" project at the University of Nottingham.
