= Mande =

Mande may refer to:

- Mandé peoples of western Africa
- Mande languages, their Niger-Congo languages
- Manding, a term covering a subgroup of Mande peoples, and sometimes used for one of them, Mandinka
- Garo people of northeastern India and northern Bangladesh
- Mande River in Bosnia and Herzegovina
- Mandé, Mali

== Surname ==
- Hendrik Mande (d. 1431), Dutch mystical writer
- Jerold Mande (b. 1954), American nutritionist and civil servant

== See also ==
- Mand (disambiguation)
- Manda (disambiguation)
- Mandean (disambiguation)
- Mandi (disambiguation)
- Manding (disambiguation)
- Mandinka (disambiguation)
