= Milly-Molly-Mandy =

Children's book series

Milly-Molly-Mandy is a set of six children's books written and illustrated by English writer Joyce Lankester Brisley published over the period 1928 to 1967. The books follow a little girl, Milly-Molly-Mandy, who wears a pink-and-white striped dress. The illustrations show the character growing from about age four through to age eight. Translations have been published in at least nine languages, including Finnish, Polish and Icelandic.

Milly-Molly-Mandy's real name is Millicent Margaret Amanda, but she was given the nickname because of the length of her full name. Her adventures are the everyday events of village life: running errands, going to school, making presents, fishing, picnicking, and so on. She lives in "the nice white cottage with the thatched roof" on the edge of a small village. Her parents, grandparents, aunt and uncle also live in the cottage. Her friends are Billy Blunt, a slightly older boy whose parents run a corn shop and Little-Friend-Susan, who lives in the cottage down the road. Occasionally, the stories include other friends such as Miss Muggin's niece Jilly; Bunchy, a slightly younger girl who first appears in the story Milly-Molly-Mandy gets a New Dress, and Jessamine, a wealthy girl whose family often holidays at The House with the Iron Railings.

== Origin ==
The stories were originally published in the Christian Science Monitor, beginning in 1925. They were first published as a collection, Milly-Molly-Mandy Stories, in 1928.

== Setting ==
The stories take place in south east England, and because of the proximity to the sea and the downs, and the chalk roads in the village, they would appear to take place near to the south coast. There are map illustrations inside the front covers of each book. Each differs slightly to indicate the different events in the stories. When they take a trip to the seaside by train, another illustration has white cliffs which would suggest Kent or Sussex, and is visually rather akin to Eastbourne. The author was born in Bexhill-on-Sea, East Sussex, which is the next town east of Eastbourne. Both Bexhill and Eastbourne have railway stations. Milly-Molly-Mandy's village (possibly based on picturesque Alfriston or similar in East Sussex) does not have a railway station but she goes to a nearby town via pony and trap to take the train, these could be akin to Polegate, Berwick or Glynde which are close to Alfriston (if the author did base the stories on her own nearby area). They are set in the late 1920s, given the state of inventions; cars are just spreading into general use but there are no telephones, household electricity or aeroplanes as a rule.

== Characters ==
=== Family ===
Milly-Molly-Mandy's real name is Millicent Margaret Amanda, but her family thought it too long a name to call every time they wanted her. She always wears a pink and white striped frock and sometimes a yellow hat. Milly-Molly-Mandy helps by running errands for the family. Milly-Molly-Mandy lives in a nice white cottage with a thatched roof with her large extended family.

Father's first name is John. Father does all the gardening and grows vegetables for the whole family to eat and sell. It is implied in the story that he married into Grandpa and Grandma's family by marrying Mother.

Mother's first name is Mary but she is called Polly in everyday use. Mother makes all the meals for the family and does all the washing. Polly is Grandpa and Grandma's daughter.

Grandpa takes the vegetables to market using his pony (Twinkletoes) and cart. He is Milly Molly Mandy's mother's father.

Grandma knits socks, mittens and nice warm woolies for them all. In Milly-Molly-Mandy Spends A Penny, Grandma teaches her to knit a tea cosy. Grandma is Mother (Polly)'s mother.

Uncle's first name is Joe. Uncle keeps cows (to give them all milk) and chickens (to give them all eggs). Joe is Mother (Polly)'s brother and Grandpa and Grandma's son.

Aunty sews frocks and shirts for them all and does the sweeping and dusting. Aunty's first name is Alice. Alice is married to Uncle (Joe), therefore is Milly Molly Mandy's aunt by marriage.

Great Aunt Margaret is Grandma's sister and came to stay for a few days. She is Mother's and Uncle's aunt and Father's and Aunty's aunt-in-law.

Topsy is Milly-Molly-Mandy's black and white cat.

Toby is Milly-Molly-Mandy's small black and white terrier.

Duckling: In the story Milly-Molly-Mandy spends a penny she saves up three pennies and buys a duckling.

=== Friends ===
Little Friend Susan (Susan Moggs) is Milly-Molly-Mandy's best friend. She lives with her mother and father and little sister Doris in a cottage near Milly-Molly-Mandy's.

Billy Blunt is another friend of Milly-Molly-Mandy's. Milly-Molly-Mandy, Susan and Billy often go around playing together. He lives with his mother and father, who own a corn shop in the village.

Jessamine is a little girl whose wealthy family often vacations at The House with the Iron Railings. In one story, she and her mother take Milly-Molly-Mandy, Billy and Susan on a drive to the Downs.

Jilly Muggins is another friend to Milly-Molly-Mandy. She lives with her Aunty, Miss Muggins, who owns a shop that sells sweets, material and other useful things that everybody in the village needs.

=== Adults in the village ===
Mr Rudge is a blacksmith who Milly-Molly-Mandy invited to their party. He plays cricket. In the last book he gets married and Milly-Molly-Mandy and Little Friend Susan are the bridesmaids.

Miss Edwards is a teacher at Milly-Molly-Mandy's school. In one of the stories, Miss Sheppard the headmistress went away and Miss Edwards became the headteacher. She moves into the school cottage. Because she was moving from the town into the cottage, Miss Edwards writes to Milly-Molly-Mandy's mother to ask if she might stay for a few days while she gets the cottage sorted out. Mother agrees to this so Milly-Molly-Mandy is worried that she will have to be on her best behavior. In fact, teacher turns out to be a completely different person away from school; Billy Blunt and Little Friend Susan wish that she had come to their houses.

=== Other Children ===
Doris Moggs is Little Friend Susan's baby sister. Milly-Molly-Mandy helps look for a name for her and decides on Primrose but Mrs Moggs had already named her Doris. When she gets locked in her own bedroom by accident, Milly-Molly-Mandy crochets Doris a bonnet.

Bunchy's name is Violet Rosemary May, called "Bunchy for short" by her Granny who makes her dresses from floral fabric. In the story Milly-Molly-Mandy has a New Dress, Bunchy and Milly-Molly-Mandy engage over buying dress fabric. Though both girls like the floral fabric, Milly-Molly-Mandy decides Bunchy should have it because of her name and the two become friends. Brisley went on to write two spin-off books about Bunchy.

== Book series, stories and editions ==
=== Original six books ===
- Milly-Molly-Mandy Stories (1928)
- More of Milly-Molly-Mandy (1929)
- Further Doings of Milly-Molly-Mandy (1932)
- Milly-Molly-Mandy Again (1948)
- Milly-Molly-Mandy & Co (1955)
- Milly-Molly-Mandy and Billy Blunt (1967)

Many printings of the original Milly-Molly-Mandy books have been made available over the decades by various publishers.

=== Stories ===
The original six books include 64 stories.

1. Milly-Molly-Mandy Stories (1928)
  - Milly-Molly-Mandy Goes Errands
  - Milly-Molly-Mandy Spends a Penny
  - Milly-Molly-Mandy Meets Her Great-Aunt
  - Milly-Molly-Mandy Goes Blackberrying
  - Milly-Molly-Mandy Goes to a Party
  - Milly-Molly-Mandy Enjoys a Visit
  - Milly-Molly-Mandy Goes Gardening
  - Milly-Molly-Mandy Makes a Cosy
  - Milly-Molly-Mandy Keeps Shop
  - Milly-Molly-Mandy Gives a Party
  - Milly-Molly-Mandy Goes Visiting
  - Milly-Molly-Mandy Gets to Know Teacher
  - Milly-Molly-Mandy Goes to a Fête
2. More of Milly-Molly-Mandy (1929)
  - Milly-Molly-Mandy Gets Up Early
  - Milly-Molly-Mandy Has a Surprise
  - Milly-Molly-Mandy Gets Up a Tree
  - Milly-Molly-Mandy Goes to a Concert
  - Milly-Molly-Mandy Has her Photo Taken
  - Milly-Molly-Mandy Goes to the Pictures
  - Milly-Molly-Mandy Goes for a Picnic
  - Milly-Molly-Mandy Looks for a Name
  - Milly-Molly-Mandy Gets Locked In
  - Milly-Molly-Mandy's Mother Goes Away
  - Milly-Molly-Mandy Goes to the Sea
  - Milly-Molly-Mandy Finds a Nest
  - Milly-Molly-Mandy Has Friends
3. Further Doings of Milly-Molly-Mandy (1932)
  - Milly-Molly-Mandy Has a Tea-Party
  - Milly-Molly-Mandy Minds a Baby
  - Milly-Molly-Mandy Goes Motoring
  - Milly-Molly-Mandy Gets a Surprise
  - Milly-Molly-Mandy Goes on an Expedition
  - Milly-Molly-Mandy Helps to Thatch a Roof
  - Milly-Molly-Mandy Writes Letters
  - Milly-Molly-Mandy Learns to Ride
  - Milly-Molly-Mandy Makes a Garden
  - Milly-Molly-Mandy Camps Out
  - Milly-Molly-Mandy Goes Carol-Singing
4. Milly-Molly-Mandy Again (1948)
  - Milly-Molly-Mandy has a New Dress
  - Milly-Molly-Mandy finds a Train
  - Milly-Molly-Mandy and the Surprise Plant
  - Milly-Molly-Mandy and the Blacksmith's Wedding
  - Milly-Molly-Mandy and Dum-dum 66
  - Milly-Molly-Mandy and the Gang 8
  - Milly-Molly-Mandy goes Sledging
5. Milly-Molly-Mandy & Co (1955)
  - Milly-Molly-Mandy Dresses Up
  - Milly-Molly-Mandy Goes for a Picnic
  - Milly-Molly-Mandy Has a Clean Frock
  - Milly-Molly-Mandy and the Golden Wedding
  - Milly-Molly-Mandy Cooks a Dinner
  - Milly-Molly-Mandy Acts for the Pictures
  - Milly-Molly-Mandy and Guy Fawkes Day
6. Milly-Molly-Mandy and Billy Blunt (1967)
  - Milly-Molly-Mandy rides a Horse
  - Milly-Molly-Mandy does an Errand
  - Milly-Molly-Mandy finds a Parcel
  - Milly-Molly-Mandy goes Excavating
  - Milly-Molly-Mandy has an Adventure
  - Milly-Molly-Mandy on Bank Holiday
  - Milly-Molly-Mandy has American Visitors
  - Milly-Molly-Mandy and a Wet Day
  - Milly-Molly-Mandy makes some Toffee

In subsequent years these stories were released in varying formats by several publishers.

=== Collections ===
Numerous variations of the original Milly-Molly-Mandy books have been issued by different publishers. Most include Joyce Lankester Brisley's original line drawings. This is an overview of pertinent editions:

==== Complete collections ====
Individual volumes:

- Milly-Molly-Mandy (6 books) Pan Macmillan U.K publishes the original six books; 2018 formatting.

Omnibus editions:

- The Adventures of Milly-Molly-Mandy, Omnibus, (1972) publisher: George G Harrap & Co, London. Includes books: #1, #2, #3.
- The Milly-Molly-Mandy, Second Omnibus (1976) publisher: George G Harrap & Co, London. Includes books: #4, #5, #6.

==== Partial collections ====
Kingfisher Publishers released The Milly-Molly-Mandy Collection (1996), a two volume slipcase set. These books are currently sold separately by Kingfisher-Macmillian:

- The Milly-Molly-Mandy Storybook (2001) 21 stories from books #1-4
- More Milly-Molly-Mandy (1999) 20 stories from books #2-6

75th Anniversary Edition:

- The Big Milly-Molly-Mandy Storybook (2000); 8 stories; Clara Vulliamy illustrations, cover and throughout; 2 pg introduction by Vulliamy; 11.125 x 8.75 in; Kingfisher Publishers.

Puffin Books has published the first four books individually and in one volume. The publications are limited to the first four books, including those mistitled as "complete":

- The Adventures of Milly Molly Mandy, 4 books in 1 (1992) 1 volume
- The Complete Milly-Molly-Mandy Box Set (2010) 4 book set
- Milly-Molly-Mandy the Complete Adventures (2012) 4 book set

=== Alternative titles ===
More recently, Milly-Molly-Mandy books have also been published under alternative titles, with five or six stories per book.

Gardners Books through Pan Macmillan published a boxed set of four books, The Best of Milly-Molly-Mandy (2004), which was later carried by Kingfisher and released separately the next year. These were billed as in a "dainty, accessible format" featuring Clara Vulliamy cover art with Brisley interior illustrations:

- Milly-Molly-Mandy's Family (2005)
- Milly-Molly-Mandy's Friends (2005)
- Milly-Molly-Mandy's Schooldays (2005)
- Milly-Molly-Mandy's Adventures (2005)

MacMillan Children's Books publishes the four above titles along with additional seasonal titles all featuring the Brisley illustrations. These are carried under the series name The World of Milly-Molly-Mandy:

- Milly-Molly-Mandy's Family (2011)
- Milly-Molly-Mandy's Friends (2012)
- Milly-Molly-Mandy's School Days (2012)
- Milly-Molly-Mandy's Adventures (2012)
- Milly-Molly-Mandy's Spring (2012)
- Milly-Molly-Mandy's Summer (2012)
- Milly-Molly-Mandy's Autumn (2012)
- Milly-Molly-Mandy's Winter (2012)

== Spin off - Bunchy books ==
The character Bunchy is introduced as a younger classmate in Milly-Molly-Mandy Again (1948) with the story "Milly-Molly-Mandy has a New Dress" and again in the last story of the book, "Milly-Molly-Mandy Goes Sledging." Her full name is Violet Rosemary May, and she is called "Bunchy for short" by Granny who makes her dresses from floral fabric.

Joyce Brisley wrote two books featuring Bunchy, who lives alone with her Granny on the outskirts of the village. The little girl uses her imagination to enjoy adventures such as engaging with characters from a card game, a little snow-globe man and a wooden sailor-doll.

The books are Illustrated with the author's pen and ink drawings. Early printings of both books included a Brisley watercolour frontispiece.

- Bunchy (1937); George G. Harrap & Co. London; ISBN 978-1903252222; republished by Puffin ISBN 9780141368672
  - 10 stories
  - Includes imaginary play with bread dough figures, scrapbook pictures and clothespegs
- Another Bunchy Book (1951); George G. Harrap & Co. London
  - 7 stories
  - Includes imaginary play with paper dolls, a child's Victorian paper-peepshow and a Staffordshire figure

== Adaptations and merchandising ==
There have been some Milly-Molly-Mandy adaptations and merchandising. Kingfisher released a Milly Molly Mandy doll and Pan Macmillan has published an activity book; there is also a niche market for Milly-Molly-Mandy's classic red and white striped dress with white bloomers.

- Plays: Three Little Milly-Molly-Mandy Plays (1938) adapted from Milly-Molly-Mandy Stories by Joyce Lankester Brisley; George G. Harrap & Co. LTD.
- Children's beginner readers: Milly-Molly-Mandy Infant Reader (1936-1939) by Joyce Lankester Brisely, adapted by Margaret McCrea; Four book series; George G. Harrap publishing. In the 1950s these illustrated books were reprinted by The Australasian Publishing Company, in Australia.
- Vinyl record: The Adventures of Milly-Molly-Mandy (1982); six stories narrated by Janie Rayne; UK Press LP; Copyright © The Trustees of The J.L.Brisley Charitable Trust
- Teacher's reading comprehension guide: Milly-Molly-Mandy Comprehension Guide (2002) by Deb Chapin; Veritas Press. The book implements Milly-Molly-Mandy as a second grade reader, highlighting comprehension, grammar and vocabulary; featuring paper dolls and recipes.

== Illustrations ==
Joyce Lankester Brisley illustrated her stories with pen and ink line drawings which continue to be featured in current editions. Colour frontispieces with Brisley's watercolours were featured in the six original books published by George G. Harrap & Co. Brisley's original artwork is held at the V&A Archive of Art and Design.

In 2000, Clara Vulliamy, of the Hughes - Vulliamy family, drafted illustrations which were featured throughout the 75th anniversary edition, The Big Milly-Molly-Mandy Storybook, released by Kingfisher-Macmillian. The Vulliamy watercolours were also used as cover art for both Kingfisher's Milly-Molly-Mandy Stories (2001) and The Best of Milly-Molly-Mandy (2005) series, with Brisley's original pen and ink drawings within these books.

== Reception ==
In writing for The Guardian, Lucy Mangan acknowledges that the stories have sometimes been represented as twee and sentimental, yet describes them as delightful and comforting, "Each story is a miniature masterpiece, as clear, warm and precise as the illustrations by the author that accompanied them".

Other reviewers have noted, "The simple rhythm of the writing and Milly-Molly-Mandy’s village goings-on makes me nostalgic for a life I was never a part of." And, "These stories soothe the reader as well as the listener.... Milly-Molly-Mandy books never truly grow old. They just grow dearer, like a childhood friend."

In a review for Girl Museum, Rebecca Taylor noted the "pure innocence of the tales" depicting an idealized rural England, illustrated "how country life for girls was very different from city life." She also described Milly-Molly-Mandy's character as "kind, strong, adventurous and brave" justifying her positive generational appeal.

The accuracy of the books' placement during the 1930s interwar period is noted in an article with Springer Nature within Children's Literature in Education by Kathryn M. Walls. Walls observed, "MMM’s village and style of living is very much of its time—to the extent that it stands as a close-to-perfect snapshot of that time." She went on, "its context reveals that Brisley was not so much inventing a complete toy-town as recreating the scene from local knowledge."
