= Manding =

Manding may refer to:

- Mand (psychology), a request or demand
- Manding languages, a language-dialect continuum in West Africa
- Mandinka (disambiguation)
  - Mandinka language, one of the Manding languages
  - Mandinka people, a West African ethnic group
- The Mandé peoples who speak Manding languages: Mandinka, Malinké, Bambara, and Dyula
- Manding Mountains in western Mali

== See also ==
- Mandingo (disambiguation)
- Manding language (disambiguation)
- Mandinka (disambiguation)
- Mande (disambiguation)
