= Joyce Lankester Brisley =

English writer

- Born: 1896; Bexhill-on-Sea, England, UK
- Died: 1978 (aged 82)
- Occupations: Writer, illustrator
- Writing career
- Notable work: Milly-Molly-Mandy series

Joyce Lankester Brisley (6 February 1896 – 1978) was an English writer. She wrote and illustrated the Milly-Molly-Mandy series, which were first printed in 1925 by the Christian Science Monitor.

== Early life, family and education ==
The second of three daughters of George Brisley, a pharmacist, of Bexhill-on-Sea, Sussex, Brisley's sisters - Ethel Constance, the eldest, and Nina Kennard, the youngest - were also illustrators. They studied art firstly at Hastings School of Art, then, following their parents' divorce in 1912 and the subsequent relocation of the girls and their mother to Brixton, at Lambeth School of Art.

== Career ==
All three sisters illustrated postcards for the publisher Alfred Vivian Mansell & Co., with Nina (who also illustrated Elinor Brent-Dyer's Chalet School series) and Ethel becoming quite prolific.

Brisley's books were first printed in 1925, and a collection appeared in book form in 1928. She wrote and illustrated six collections of Milly-Molly-Mandy, amongst other works.

== Death ==
Brisley died in 1978 at the age of 82. She left the J L Brisley Charitable Trust, which provides financial assistance to religious charities in London as specified in her will. The 2022 total expenditure was £5,070.

== Publications ==
Milly-Molly-Mandy

- Milly-Molly-Mandy Stories (1928)
- Milly-Molly-Mandy Again (1929)
- Milly-Molly-Mandy and Co. (1932)
- More of Milly-Molly-Mandy (1948)
- Further Doings of Milly-Molly-Mandy (1955)
- Milly-Molly-Mandy and Billy Blunt (1967)

Novels (non-series)

- Hurrah for the Trains (1919)
- Jolly Days At the Zoo (1921)
- Bunchy (1937) (also published in The Joyce Lankester Brisley Book)
- "Adventures of the Little Wooden Horse" (1938)
- The Adventures of Purl and Plain (1941)
- Another Bunchy book (1951)
- Children of Bible Days (1970)
- The New Testament Story (1973)
- Model Trains (1979)
- Marigold in Godmother's House (2001) (originally published in The Joyce Lankester Brisley Book)

Collections

- The Dawn Shops, and Other Stories (1942)
- The Joyce Lankester Brisley Book (1981)

Non-fiction

- My Bible Book (1964)
- From the Exile to Christ: A Historical Introduction to Palestinian Judaism (1964)
