= Mandy (Irving Berlin song) =

Irving Berlin song

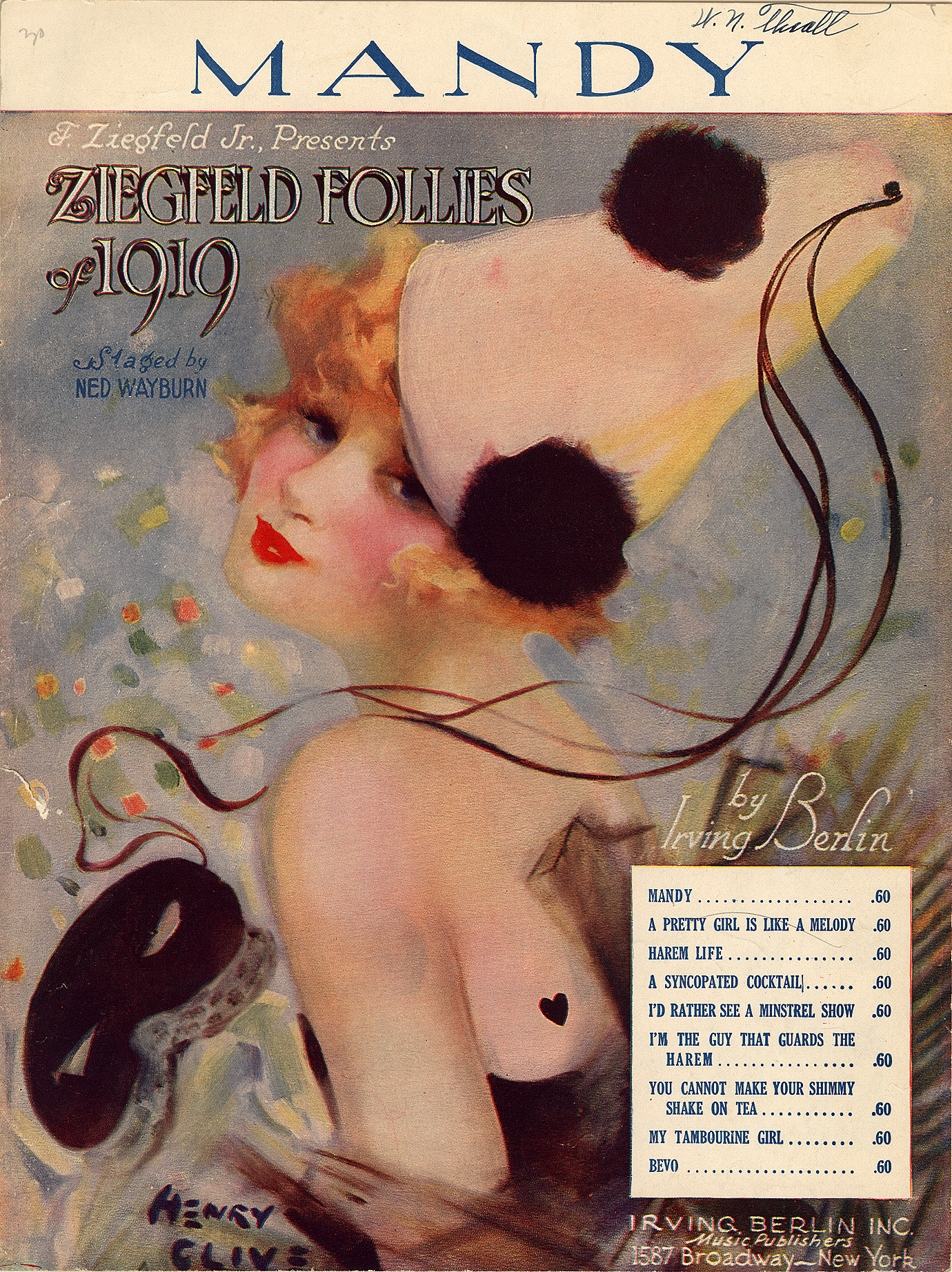
Sheet music cover

"Mandy" is a popular song by Irving Berlin, published in 1919.

== History ==
"Mandy" was originally used for an Army-themed musical revue called Yip Yip Yaphank during World War I. For the number, soldiers in the show dressed in blackface and in drag. This song and chorus line was also re-created for the 1942 play and the 1943 Warner Brothers film This Is The Army.

The number became a hit when it was re-used in the Ziegfeld Follies of 1919, where it was performed by Eddie Cantor, Van and Schenck and Marilyn Miller.

This song was performed by Eddie Cantor, Ethel Merman, Ann Sothern, George Murphy, The Nicholas Brothers, and The Goldwyn Girls in the 1934 film Kid Millions.

The song was revived in the 1954 movie White Christmas, where it was sung by Bing Crosby, Danny Kaye, and Rosemary Clooney. Crosby also recorded the song in 1954 for use on his radio show and it was subsequently included in the box set The Bing Crosby CBS Radio Recordings (1954-56) issued by Mosaic Records (catalog MD7-245) in 2009.
