= Mandy Quadrio =

Australian artist

Mandy Quadrio is a Brisbane/Meanjin-based contemporary artist of Palawa heritage.

== Biography ==
Born in Melbourne, Quadrio has strong ties to her ancestral Country of the Coastal Plains Nation and the Oyster Bay Nation of tebrakunna, North-East lutruwita (Tasmania). Quadrio is an artist of national significance, having been included in solo and group exhibitions across Australia, and commissioned by major institutions such as the Queen Victoria Museum and Art Gallery, Launceston. She works in sculpture, installation, photography and mixed media.

== Career ==
Quadrio is a graduate of the Bachelor of Contemporary Australian Indigenous Art (CAIA) degree at Queensland College of Art, part of Griffith University, in 2016. She then completed an Honours degree in Fine Art in 2017, winning the Griffith University Medal for Outstanding Academic Excellence. Quadrio is currently a PhD candidate at Griffith University. Her thesis is a continuation of her Honours research, which sought to redress the losses, invisibility and erasures of palawa (Tasmanian Aboriginal) women throughout history.

Many of Quadrio's works use found objects and natural materials, such as Tasmanian bull kelp, ochres and river reeds. Another strand of her practice deploys stainless steel wool, hung in bulbous forms or moulded to the shape of a canoe. Quadrio has also produced photographic works, such as the series of self-portraits face to face to face (2019).

Quadrio seeks to bring attention to the ongoing effects of brutality toward Indigenous people from Australian colonial history to the contemporary moment, seeing her works as acts of resistance and sovereignty. She says: “I’m rejecting the framing of colonisation and foregrounding my history by representing palawa culture, stories and lived experiences in my own way, and in my own terms”.

Quadrio’s series of vulval-like forms in bull kelp speak to gendered Aboriginal histories, violence towards Aboriginal women, but also sensuous celebrations of female sexuality.

== Works ==
- I speak to uncover the mouths of silence (2020), Queen Victoria Museum and Art Gallery, Launceston, Tasmania.
- Here lies lies (2019), Tasmanian Museum and Art Gallery, Hobiennale 2019, Hobart, Tasmania.

== Solo exhibitions ==
2022 Beyond misty histories, presented by Constance ARI in association with Mona Foma, Hobart, Tasmania

2019 Mandy Quadrio: face to face to face, Kuiper Projects, Brisbane

2019 Mandy Quadrio: The Country Within, IMA Belltower at the Judith Wright Centre of Contemporary Arts, Brisbane

2018 Speaking Beyond the Vitrine, Metro Arts, Brisbane

== Group exhibitions ==
2021 Tarrawarra Biennial, TarraWarra Museum of Art, Healesville, Victoria

2021 Water Rites, ACE Open, Adelaide

2020 Rites of Passage, QUT Art Museum, Brisbane

2020 The muddy banks of kanamaluka, Sawtooth ARI, Launceston, Tasmania

2018 Hatched National Graduate Show, Perth Institute of Contemporary Art (PICA)

== Awards ==
2019 Finalist, Woollahra Small Sculpture Prize, Sydney

2018 Finalist, Hatched, National Graduate Art Show, Perth Institute of Contemporary Arts, Perth

2017 Winner, The St Andrew’s War Memorial Hospital Award, Queensland College of Art, Brisbane
