= Mandel (disambiguation) =

Mandel is a Dutch, German and Jewish surname, or any of several people with that surname.

Mandel may also refer to:

== Places ==
- Mandel, Germany, a place in Rhineland-Palatinate
- Mandel (river), Belgium

== People ==
- Mandel Szkolnikoff (1895–1945), Russian businessman
- Mandel Kramer (1916–1989), American actor
- Mandel "Mandy" Patinkin (born 1952), American actor

=== Fictional characters ===
- Mandel Karlsson, a Swedish comic character

== Other uses ==
- Mandel (nut), the German name for almonds
- Mandel Photo Postcard Machine, camera
- Mandel notation, a representational system in algebra
- Kleindienst v. Mandel, a United States Supreme Court decision on immigration
- Shkedei marak, also known as "soup mandels"

== See also ==
- Mandell, surname
- Mandl, surname
- Mandle, surname
- Mendel (disambiguation)
