= Mundel (surname) =

Mundel is a surname. Notable people with the surname include:

- Jennifer Mundel (born 1962), South African tennis player
- Luella Mundel (1913–2004), American art professor
- Munna Lal Mundel, Indian naik

== See also ==
- Mandel
- Munde (surname)
- Mundell
