= Mandell =

Mandell is a surname and a given name:

Notable people with the surname include:

- Arnold J. Mandell, American neuroscientist and psychiatrist
- Barbara Mandell (1920–1998), British television journalist and travel writer
- Daniel Mandell (1895–1987), American film editor
- Eleni Mandell (born 1969), American singer-songwriter
- Koby Mandell, Israeli-American child, killed in 2001 by Palestinian terrorists
- Mike Mandell, American lawyer and YouTuber
- Richard Mandell (born 1968), American golf course architect
- Robert Mandell (film producer), American animated series and film director and producer
- Robert Mandell (conductor) (born 1929), American conductor
- Sammy Mandell (born 1904), boxer
- Sherri Mandell, Israeli author and activist
- Steve Mandell (c. 1941–2018), American bluegrass guitarist and banjoist

Notable people with the given name include:

- Mandell Berman (born 1917), businessman and philanthropist
- Mandell Creighton (1843–1901), English historian and a prelate of the Church of England
- Mandell Maughan, American actress
- Mandell Matheson (1938–2011), American journalist and politician

== See also ==
- Mandel
- Mantell (disambiguation)
- Mendel (disambiguation)
- Mindell
- Mundell
