= Mindel =

Mindel may refer to:

- Mindel (river), a tributary of the Danube in Bavaria, Germany
- Dan Mindel (born 1958), South African-American cinematographer
- David Mindel (born 1946), British songwriter and composer
- Nissan Mindel (1912–1999), Latvian and American rabbi
- Mindel C. Sheps (1913–1973), Canadian physician, biostatistician and demographer

== See also ==
- Mindel glaciation
- Mindell
- Mindelo
