= Franz Mandl =

Franz Mandl may refer to:

- Franz Mandl (footballer)
- Franz Mandl (physicist)
