= Christopher Rowley =

American writer (born 1948)

- Born: 1948 (age 77–78); Lynn, Massachusetts, U.S.
- Occupation: Writer
- Writing career
- Genres: Science fiction; fantasy

Christopher Rowley (born 1948) is an American writer specializing in the science fiction and fantasy genres. He is also a former journalist and television screenwriter.

Christopher Rowley was born in 1948 in Lynn, Massachusetts, to an American mother and an English father. Educated primarily at Brentwood School, in Essex, England, he became a London-based journalist in the 1970s. In 1977 he moved to New York City, and now lives in upstate New York's Hudson Valley.

Rowley's first science fiction novel was The War for Eternity, published in 1983, which won the Compton Crook Award for best first novel. The War for Eternity led to three further novels set in the same future: The Black Ship, The Founder, and To a Highland Nation. His novel Starhammer has been cited by computer programmer Jason Jones as an important literary influence in the creation of the Halo video game series by Bungie. Starhammer was followed by The Vang: The Military Form and The Vang: The Battlemaster to form a loosely connected trilogy (all published by Ballantine Books) spanning several thousand years and involving different sets of characters in each book.

In the 1990s, Rowley switched to the fantasy genre with the success of his first novel for Roc Books, Bazil Broketail. This novel was set on the imaginary world Ryetelth and involved the adventures of battledragons and the boys that care for them in the service of the legions of the nine cities of the Argonath. Bazil Broketail's adventures continued with Sword for a Dragon, Dragons of War, Battledragon, A Dragon at World's End, Dragons of Argonath, and Dragon Ultimate. The Ryetelth novels also include a tangential story, told in The Wizard and the Floating City, that interrupted the sequence of Bazil Broketail novels and introduced new characters and a broadening of the conceptual framework of the entire series. In the 1980s and 1990s he also co-wrote two television animated series by Robert Mandell, The Adventures of the Galaxy Rangers and Princess Gwenevere and the Jewel Riders.

After the conclusion of the Bazil Broketail series, he produced the Books of Arna, a trilogy set on Arna, a world colonized by humans in the far future. This series began with The Ancient Enemy, continued with The Shasht War, and concluded with Doom's Break. In February 2009, Rowley's first illustrated novel, titled Arkham Woods, a supernatural tale of horror inspired by the Cthulhu Mythos of H.P. Lovecraft and published by Seven Seas.

== Publications ==
=== Arna trilogy ===
1. The Ancient Enemy. New York: ROC. 2000. ISBN 978-0-451-45772-1. OCLC 43436203.
2. The Shasht War. New York: Roc. 2001. ISBN 978-0-451-45817-9. OCLC 45964503.
3. Doom's Break. New York: Roc. 2002. ISBN 978-0-451-45903-9. OCLC 51205574.

=== Bazil Broketail series ===
1. Bazil Broketail. ROC. New York: Penguin Group. 1992. ISBN 978-0-451-45206-1. OCLC 26368255.
2. A Sword for a Dragon. New York: Roc. 1993. ISBN 978-0-451-45235-1.
3. Dragons of War. New York: Roc. 1994. ISBN 978-0-451-45342-6. OCLC 31417622.
4. Battledragon. Penguin Books USA. 1995. ISBN 978-0-451-45343-3.
5. A Dragon at World's End. New York: ROC. 1997. ISBN 978-0-451-45546-8. OCLC 36279351.
6. The Dragons of Argonath. New York: Roc. 1998. ISBN 978-0-451-45547-5. OCLC 38276149.
7. Dragon Ultimate. New York: Penguin Group. 1999. ISBN 978-0-451-45548-2.
8. The Wizard and the Floating City. New York: ROC. 1996. ISBN 978-0-451-45469-0. OCLC 18766305.
9. Lands of Terror. Voyager.World. 2018. ISBN 978-0-997-71836-2.

==== Battle Dragons books ====
- The Doom. Voyager.World. 2016.
- Witch Sword. Voyager.World. 2016. ISBN 978-0-997-71831-7.
- Demon Blood. Voyager.World. 2017. ISBN 978-0-997-71833-1.

=== Fenrille series ===
1. The Founder. Del Rey Books. 1989. ISBN 978-0-345-33175-5.
2. To a Highland Nation. New York: Del Rey Book. 1993. ISBN 978-0-345-35860-8.
3. The War for Eternity. New York: Ballantine Books. 1983. ISBN 978-0-345-31052-1. OCLC 10791177.
4. The Black Ship. New York: Ballantine Books. 1985. ISBN 978-0-345-31489-5. OCLC 12442237.

=== Netherworld trilogy ===
1. Pleasure Model. New York: Tor. 2010. ISBN 978-0-7653-2388-0. OCLC 428027295.
2. The Bloodstained Man. New York: Tor. 2010. ISBN 978-0-765-32389-7. OCLC 12442237.
3. Money Shot. Netherworld. New York: Tor. 2010. ISBN 978-0-7653-2390-3.

=== The Vang trilogy ===
1. Starhammer. New York: Del Rey Book. 1986. ISBN 978-0-345-31490-1.
2. The Military Form. New York: Ballantine Books. 1988. ISBN 978-0-345-33176-2.
3. The Vang: The Battlemaster. Dey Rel Science fiction. New York: Ballantine Books. 1990. ISBN 978-0-345-35859-2.

=== Standalone books ===
- Golden Sunlands. New York: Ballantine Books. 1987. ISBN 978-0-345-33174-8. OCLC 18766305.
- Arkham Woods. Illustrated by Jhomar Soriano. Seven Seas. 2009. ISBN 978-1-934-87636-7.
