= Mandello =

Mandello may refer to:

== Places ==
- Mandello del Lario, a town on Lake Como in Lombardy, Italy
- Mandello Vitta, a village in the Province of Novara in the region Piedmont, Italy

== People with the surname ==
- Jeanne Mandello (1907–2001), German modern artist and experimental photographer

== See also ==
- Mandell, a surname
