= Mandl =

Mandl is a South German surname. Notable people with the surname include:

- Alex J. Mandl (1943–2022), Austrian-American businessman
- Daniel Mandl (1891–1945), Czech civil engineer, inventor, student of anthroposophy, and Holocaust victim, father of Herbert
- Dragutin Mandl (1892–1959), Croatian mechanical engineer involved with the first trams in Zagreb
- Felix Mandl (1898–?), Croatian businessman of Austrian Jewish descent
- Franz Mandl (footballer) (1916–1988), Austrian footballer
- Franz Mandl (1923–2009), British physicist
- Friedrich Mandl (1900–1977), Austrian-Argentine businessman
- Herbert Thomas Mandl (1926–2007), Czechoslovak-German author, son of Daniel
- Jubilee Jenna Mandl (born 1984), Austrian figure skater
- Jürgen Mandl (born 1965), Austrian athlete
- Maria Mandl (1912–1948), Austrian Nazi SS commandant at Auschwitz, executed for war crimes
- Miklós Mandl, birth name of Nickolas Muray (1892-1965), Hungarian-born American photographer and fencer
- Peter Mandl (born 1947), Swedish sculptor
- Petr Mandl (1933–2012), Czech mathematician
- Thomas Mandl (born 1979), Austrian footballer
- Vladimír Mandl (1899–1941), Czechoslovak lawyer and space law pioneer

== See also ==
- Mandel
- Mandle
- Joseph Mandl House, a historic house in Jerome, Idaho, United States
