= Princess Gwenevere and the Jewel Riders =

Television series

- Cover art of the Family Home Entertainment VHS release Full Circle, depicting the three Jewel Riders (Fallon, Tamara, Gwenevere) and Kale holding the Dark Stone.
- Also known as: Starla & the Jewel Riders
- Genre: Adventure; Fantasy comedy; Magical girl; Musical
- Created by: Robert Mandell
- Directed by: Robert Mandell
- Voices of: Kerry Butler; Jean Louisa Kelly; Corinne Orr; Deborah Allison; Laura Dean; John Beach; Bob Kaliban; Peter Fernandez; Henry Mandell
- Theme music composer: Jeff Pescetto
- Composers: Jeff Pescetto (songs); Louis Fagenson (score)
- Country of origin: United States
- Original language: English
- No. of seasons: 2
- No. of episodes: 26

Production
- Executive producers: Allen J. Bohbot; Joseph Cohen; Robert Mandell; Ralph Sorrentino
- Producers: Winnie Chaffee; Eleanor Kearney; Raissa D. Roque
- Running time: 22 minutes
- Production companies: New Frontier Entertainment; Enchanted Camelot Productions

Original release
- Network: Syndication (Amazin' Adventures)
- Release: September 9, 1995 – December 12, 1996

Related
- Princess Gwenevere and the Jewel Riders (2024)

Princess Gwenevere and the Jewel Riders, sometimes spelled as the more traditionally Arthurian "Guinevere", (Note: (Los Angeles Times) "Princess Guinevere & The Jewel Riders: Animated action-adventures of three teen gals and their animal best friends who save Avalon from the evil Lady Kale." (The San Diego Union Tribune) "Another entry is Princess Guinevere and the Jewel Riders,' also taking off on magic powers and saving the world, but adding an evil sorceress to the mix.") and known outside of North America as Starla & the Jewel Riders, is an American fantasy animated television series inspired by the Arthurian legend and aimed at the pre-teen girl audience. It was produced by New Frontier Entertainment and Enchanted Camelot Productions, with animation provided by Hong Ying Animation. It was distributed internationally by Bohbot Entertainment, and broadcast in the United States on their syndicated Amazin' Adventures block, where it originally ran from 1995 to 1996, for two seasons of thirteen episodes each.

The series follows the titular protagonist, Princess Gwenevere of Avalon, and her fellow teenage Jewel Riders, Fallon and Tamara, in their quest to find the seven lost enchanted jewels and to stop the evil sorceress Lady Kale from conquering Avalon. In the second season, the Jewel Riders gain new powers and fight against Kale and a new enemy, Morgana, as they search for more magical jewels in order to rescue their banished mentor, Merlin, and restore harmony in magic.

The series bears similarities to The Adventures of the Galaxy Rangers, having the same creator and director, Robert Mandell, as well as some writers in common, notably Christopher Rowley. The series was initially planned to be an adaptation of Dragonriders of Pern and was developed after Bohbot's earlier take on the Arthurian legend, King Arthur and the Knights of Justice. During the 2000s, Jewel Riders inspired the novel and comic book series Avalon: Web of Magic. A Princess Gwenevere and the Jewel Riders soft reboot comic miniseries was published by Mad Cave Studios starting in 2024, including a crossover story merging it with the world and characters of King Arthur and the Knights of Justice.

== Plot ==
=== Premise ===
The series is mainly set on the legendary island of Avalon, here portrayed as an utopian kingdom where mystical jewels help their users cast spells and the master of magic is the wizard Merlin. Avalon is ever threatened by unstable "wild magic", which comes from another dimension also known as Wild Magic and is kept in check by the seven Crown Jewels of the Kingdom, each representing a different land of Avalon. The raw, untamed wild magic is usually (other than by few wizards, who can wield magic naturally) channeled and controlled using the Enchanted Jewels.

The story takes place a thousand years after Merlin's initial victory over Queen Morgana and her dark wizards. The eponymous Jewel Riders are an order of young magical guardians of the city of New Camelot who, mentored by Merlin and aided by their magic animals, have defended the realm and its people for centuries, with each generation bequeathing their jewels to the next generation. When Avalon again faces a great threat and Merlin suddenly disappears, the current generation of Jewel Riders is tasked with recovering the scattered Crown Jewels and containing wild magic before it gets out of control. An emphasis is placed on the "power of friendship", which allows the Jewel Riders to overcome evil and befriend some of their enemies (those redeemable).

The latest incarnation of the group consists of its leader, the 16-year-old Princess Gwenevere, a distant descendant of King Arthur's wife, Queen Guinevere, who was named after her, and her friends Fallon and Tamara. In addition to granting them powers, their personal jewels allow them to safely traverse the tunnels of Wild Magic and communicate with their Special Friends, magic animals who wear a jewel identical to that of their rider. The Jewel Riders are often aided by the also-teenage but male Pack, a trio of wolf-riding knights who wield the Forest Stones. Together, they fight against Lady Kale, the former princess of Avalon who uses dark magic and ruthlessly seeks the Crown Jewels to turn them evil so she may rule the kingdom forever.

In the second season, the threat to Avalon is not yet over, and the Jewel Riders must fight against not only Kale but also the returning and even more powerful Morgana, with the girls using their own now much greater powers. Instead of the Crown Jewels, they all search for another set of magical jewels, the Wizard Jewels.

=== First season ===
Princess Gwenevere, the daughter of the rulers of Avalon, Queen Anya and King Jared, is being prepared by Merlin for the ceremony in which she will receive the royal Sun Stone, one of the prime Enchanted Jewels, and meet her magic animal, who will bond with both the Sun Stone and with her. This will allow her to become the new leader of the Jewel Riders along with Tamara and Fallon, who wield the Heart Stone and Moon Stone, respectively.

Meanwhile, the outlaw Lady Kale, Merlin's sworn enemy and Queen Anya's power-hungry sister who was banished after being denied the Sun Stone, plans to steal Merlin's Crown Jewels and command the magic of Avalon. She finds a mysterious and powerful jewel of dark magic, which she names the Dark Stone, and uses it to trap Merlin and banish him to Wild Magic. However, in an effort to prevent Kale from gaining the Crown Jewels, Merlin sends them back to where they came from, scattering them throughout the kingdom and beyond. Without the Jewels, magic becomes unstable and goes out of control, causing dangerous outbreaks until they can be gathered, which the Jewel Riders learn may also be the only way to free Merlin from Wild Magic. Gwen soon successfully completes her Sun Stone bonding ceremony with Sunstar, a flying unicorn she had just rescued from Kale.

The story then follows the adventures of the Jewel Riders as they search for the Crown Jewels while dealing with outbreaks of wild magic. The seven (Note: In the 1994 draft script, there were supposed to be ten Stones.) Crown Jewels are the Jewel of the North Woods, the Rainbow Jewel, the Jewel of the Burning Ice, the Misty Rose Jewel, the Desert Star Jewel, the Jewel of the Dreamfields, and the Jewel of the Jungle. The Jewel Riders must find them before Lady Kale does and save Merlin and Avalon. Along the way, they work to contain the chaos in the magic that Kale deliberately works to make worse. They also manage to reconnect the long-hidden realm of Faeryland to Avalon after freeing it from Kale's would-be evil reign, learning the strange faery magic, and Fallon reconnects with her estranged parents after saving Gwenevere from Kale.

In the season finale, Lady Kale seizes control of the Jewel Keep at the Crystal Palace and becomes seemingly unstoppable as she overthrows Anya and declares herself queen of Avalon, unleashing dark magic onto New Camelot and stripping the Jewel Riders of their powers. She then seeks out Merlin to finish him off, but he uses his remaining power to pull her into Wild Magic, allowing the girls to release the hidden good magic of the Crystal Palace, which is revealed to be secretly a gigantic Enchanted Jewel. Kale attempts to absorb the powers of the Crown Jewels but fails and is powerless as the magic turns against her and she is destroyed. As the Jewel Riders celebrate their victory, Merlin also appears to congratulate them, but informs them that he sacrificed his staff jewel so that Kale could be defeated and that without it, he will be lost to Wild Magic.

=== Second season ===
With both Kale and Merlin now seemingly gone, some time has passed as the peace since returned to Avalon, but the kingdom is not quite safe yet as outbreaks of wild magic continue. Without Merlin, and his jewel (doubling as a key to the Crown Jewels box), the Jewel Riders have lost a chance of solving the magic crisis for good. However, they have gained much more powerful magic from the Crown Jewels tuned to their personal Enchanted Jewels, enabling them to deal with the outbreaks.

Meanwhile, Lady Kale's Dark Stone is summoned to a floating palace within Wild Magic. There, Kale re-materializes and meets the legendary enchantress Morgana, the creator and original wielder of the Dark Stone, which just brought Morgana back to existence, too. A millennium ago, Morgana led the ancient wizards against Merlin but failed and, having lost her jewel, has been trapped in Wild Magic since. United by their mutual hatred of Merlin and his followers, they strike a deal and Morgana sends Kale in search of the Wizard Jewels in preparation for her return. Back in Avalon, Kale is first beaten by the Jewel Riders in a race to the information about the Wizard Jewels, but then sneaks into the Jewel Keep again and learns their general locations anyway.

While the Jewel Riders search for the Wizard Jewels for a way to restore Merlin, they are opposed by both Lady Kale and Morgana, also in realms of strange magic outside of Avalon. The seven Wizard Jewels, not counting the Dark Stone, are the Unicorn Jewel, the Jewel of Arden, the Garden Jewel, the Jewel of the Sea, the Time Stone, and the Fortune Jewel. The girls, now supported by Queen Anya, initially struggle to control their amazing (and highly creative) new powers but eventually master them. Soon, Tamara gains a magic animal for herself, which turns out to be the otherworldly unicorn Shadowsong. Later, Princess Gwenevere finds a new romantic interest in the mysterious boy, Ian, after they save each other from Kale and Morgana. While working for Morgana, who wants to use their magic to conquer Avalon, Kale has her own agenda as she seeks the Wizard Jewels for herself. Behind Morgana's back, Kale tries to work alone, intending to steal all the magic; Morgana sees right through Kale's fake loyalty, planning to discard her the moment she regains full strength.

In the final battle between the Jewel Riders and their evil rivals at the Heart of Avalon and then at the (Stonehenge-like) Heart of Wild Magic, Gwenevere is given the magic Staff of Avalon by the Lady of the Lake (the Spirit of Avalon in the Starla version), allowing her and Ian to defeat Lady Kale a second time, turning Kale and her minions into statues, and to rescue Gwen's own companions from the same fate. Kale is not revived by Morgana when the latter steals the Wizard Jewels. The girls and their allies then unite to fight Morgana in a series of trials recalling their earlier adventures, until Gwen fuses the Dark Stone with the Sun Stone to create the all-powerful One Jewel forged from all the Wizard Jewels. The freed Merlin uses it to erase Morgana (and assorted magic-ghosts of other evil ancient wizards) once and for all, after which he finally returns to Avalon.

== Characters ==
=== Jewel Riders ===
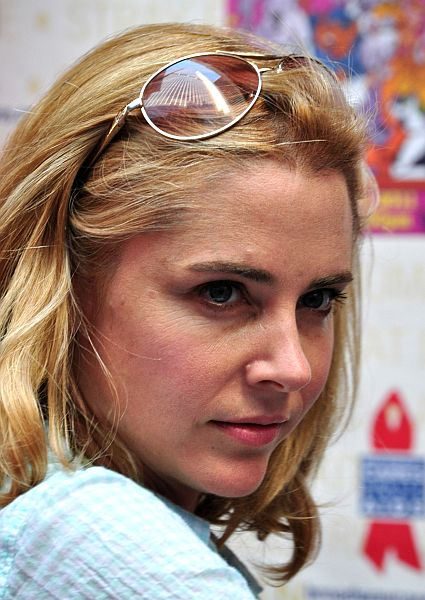
Kerry Butler (pictured in 2014) voiced Gwenevere/Starla in the show's first season

The Jewel Riders are Princess Gwenevere (renamed as Princess Starla in the Starla version), Fallon, and Tamara, the magical girl-style trio of teenage friends based in the royal Crystal Palace at New Camelot. Each of them possesses a different Enchanted Jewel, a magical gemstone that grants them their powers (some shared and others unique) and allows them to telepathically (or verbaly, from human side) communicate with their respective bonded magic animal. Using rhymed invocations helps them with complicated or unusual spells. They can also enter portals to the dangerous tunnels inside Wild Magic to fast travel between different parts of Avalon. As the series begins, they embark on a quest to collect the lost Crown Jewels and save their kingdom. Their powers grow much stronger in the second season, when they also learn how to turn into mermaids while their new sets of magical jewel armour suits make them able to fly.

- Princess Gwenevere (voiced by Kerry Butler in the first season and Jean Louisa Kelly in the second season) is the adventurous and romantic daughter of the rulers of Avalon, Queen Anya (sister of the outlaw Princess Kale) and King Jared. Gwenevere, or Gwen, is the destined future queen and the current novice leader of the Jewel Riders, trained by her parents but whose training by Merlin had only just began before he was trapped by Kale. Now, the initially insecure and inexperienced Gwen must lead her friends to put an end to her aunt's evil ambition. She wields the royal Sun Stone, which gives her powers of light and goodness. Gwen often flirts with (and teases) Drake and later falls in love with Ian. Her magic animal is the winged unicorn Sunstar (voiced by Deborah Allison).
- Fallon (voiced by Deborah Allison) is a black member of the Jewel Riders and Princess Gwenevere's tomboyish and practical personal bodyguard, trained in physical skills and martial arts. A daredevil skilled rider, and an athletic and acrobatic warrior and scout of the team, Fallon is also an informal female member of the traditionally all-male Pack, and prefers their company over Gwen's parties. Fallon has an initially uneasy relationship with her own parents but eventually patches it up with the help of her friends. She wields the Moon Stone, which gives her powers of movement and illusion. Her magic animal, who she shares as a double mount with Tamara in the first season, is the unicorn princess Moondance (voiced by Barbara Jean Kearney). In the second season, Moondance proves to be worthy to become the next queen of the unicorns.
- Tamara (voiced by Laura Dean), formally Lady Tamara, is an empathetic and spiritual longtime close friend of Fallon. She wields the Heart Stone, which enables her to understand and talk to any animal as well as giving her healing powers and the ability to perform magical music. Her loving parents own a farm of magic animals and Tamara herself raises three little animal "babies" in the Crystal Palace (Cleo the unicorn, Sugar the dragon, Spike the panther). In the second season, she pairs with the "zebracorn" Shadowsong (voiced by Henry Mandell) whose unique power allows the Jewel Riders to enter and exit Wild Magic anywhere during their travels to the magical realms outside Avalon.

=== Allies ===
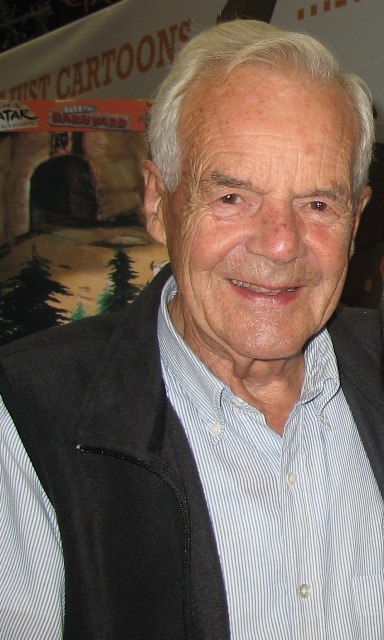
The show's voice acting director Peter Fernandez also played multiple characters, including Max and Grimm

- Merlin (voiced by Bob Kaliban) is a powerful and ancient wizard who has defended Avalon from evil for centuries. He is an advisor to the royal family and a mentor to the Jewel Riders. Once Merlin's own ex-student Lady Kale, blaming him for having ruined her future when he chose Anya to receive the Sun Stone and become queen, banishes Merlin to Wild Magic, the Jewel Riders begin their search for the Crown Jewels to save him and Avalon. Merlin's talking owl familiar, Archimedes, also known as Archie (voiced by John Beach "Voiceguy"), becomes their companion. Merlin still occassionally manages to help the girls, and appears to give short advices whenever a Crown Jewel is secured, but later becomes lost to Wild Magic after sacrificing his own magic jewel so Kale could be stopped. In the second season, he starts appearing only towards the end.
- The Wolf Pack, or just the Pack, is a male trio of also-teenage knights of the Crystal Palace, who wield the Forest Stones and aid the Jewel Riders (more so in the first season than the second) under Gwenevere's orders. They are led by Gwen's aspiring boyfriend, the dashing Drake (voiced by John Beach), who rides the giant wolf Thunderbolt (or just Thunder). Its other members are Josh (voiced by Bob Kaliban) and Max (voiced by Peter Fernandez), with their wolves Stormrunner and Windwalker. Drake is quite different in the comics, where he retires from the Pack, now being led by Fallon.
- Queen Anya (voiced by Corinne Orr) and King Jared (voiced by Bob Kaliban) are the benevolent rulers of Avalon and Gwenevere's caring parents. Anya is the good sister of Lady Kale and used to wield the Sun Stone during her time as a part of the Jewel Riders with her mount, the tigress Wintermane. Jared had been the previous leader of the Pack, riding the wolf Goliath, and still wields his Forest Stone. Anya has a more active role in the second season, replacing Merlin in the role of the mentor of the Jewel Riders and sending them on missions. She is named Adrianna (her work-in-progress name during the development of the show) in the comics, where she seems to be loved instead of hated by Kale (and loves her back).
- Ian (voiced by Bob Kaliban) is a young man-wolf prince of the Forest of Arden who falls in love with Gwenevere. He becomes Gwen's devoted champion and her second romantic partner in addition to Drake.

=== Villains ===
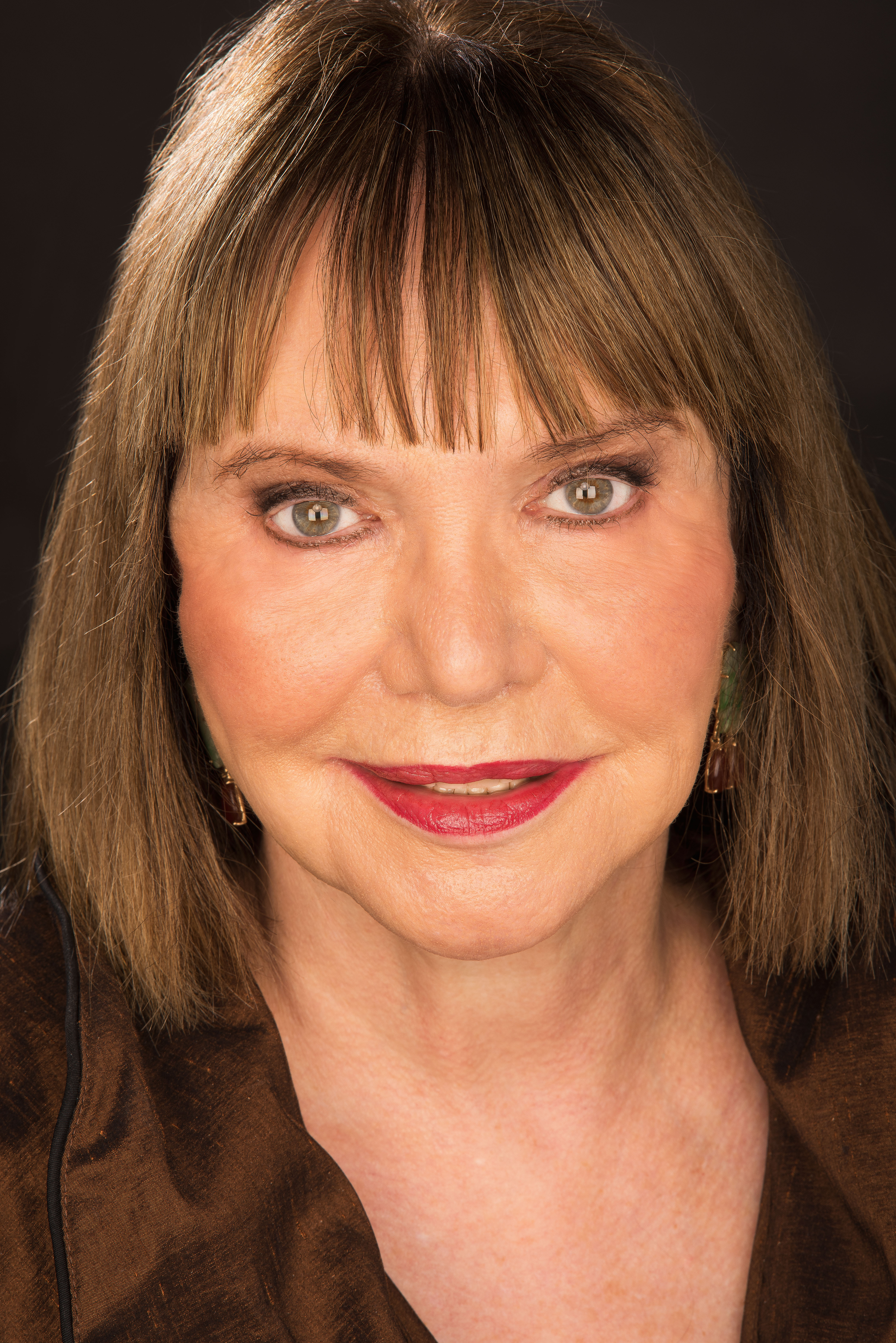
Corinne Orr voiced the evil Lady Kale and her good sister Queen Anya

- Lady Kale (voiced by Corinne Orr) is Gwenevere's depraved and cruel aunt who wields the Dark Stone and is the greatest threat faced by Avalon in a thousand years (until eclipsed by the returning Morgana). As Queen Anya's evil twin sister, Kale is an "outlaw princess" who believes she is the rightful heir to the throne, a position which was "stolen" from her by Merlin. Highly skilled in magic and physically fit, Kale was once Merlin's prodigy apprentice and would-be Jewel Rider but was denied the Sun Stone for her selfishness and then banished for plotting against him and Anya. Now, based in her Castle Thornwood, she plans to steal all of his power to become the everlasting ruler of Avalon at all cost. Kale's erratic Dark Stone with the powers of destruction and corruption gives her own jewel armour. She is proud and dramatic, often overconfident, and easy to anger. Kale's beloved and vicious dragon Grimm (voiced by Peter Fernandez) carries her in an aerial wagon. Her other bad magic animals are a duo of small and mischievous dragon-weasel creatures, the comical but spiteful brothers Rufus and Twig (voiced by John Beach and Henry Mandell, respectively) that are bonded to Kale through the Dark Stone and serve as her spies and jewel-trackers despite being often abused by her. She also has human agents, notably a traveling gang known as the Outlaws. She ends up disintegrated by the unleashed good magic at the end of the first season, but is soon later unintentionally brought back to life by Morgana and the two make a relucant pact, as Kale agrees to work for her (with Morgana, according to Kale) to find the Wizard Jewels while having her own agenda to use their power for herself. On her side, Morgana is fully aware that Kale is disloyal, so she only uses her as a pawn until she no longer needs her. Kale has a quite different character in the comics, where notably she appears to be very close to her sister instead of Kale's burning hatred for Anya in the show.
- Queen Morgana (voiced by Deborah Allison), is a mysterious elf-like evil sorceress who was the creator and original wielder of the Dark Stone. A millennium ago, she led the ancient wizards against her former ally Merlin but failed and, having been separated from her jewel, has been trapped in Wild Magic since. (Like Merlin, she does not necessarily need a jewel for her magic, but no one can survive within Wild Magic without one.) In the second season, she and Lady Kale are both revived by the Dark Stone and Morgana, unable to escape the Wild Magic on her own as the Dark Stone is no longer tuned to her, recruits Kale but treats her as a mere sidekick, seeing Kale as untrustworthy upstart and constantly ordering the haughty ex-princess around and reminding her who is in charge. They then fight against the Jewel Riders together, with Morgana lending Kale her own power (channeled through the Dark Stone), but secretly plot to betray each other. On occassions, Morgana confronts the Jewel Riders alone. Several other ancient wizards allied with Morgana against Merlin. Among them, the most notable is Derek, who eventually sides with Merlin and aids the Jewel Riders against Morgana (and Kale). One of the other major (episodic) characters is Chance, a former apprentice of the wizard Mallory who also ends up helping the girls against Kale and Morgana. In the comic series, Morgana only plays a major appearance in the Knights of Justice crossover along with her counterpart from this show.

== Episodes ==
=== Season 1 (1995) ===
No.	Title	Written by	Original release date
1	"Jewel Quest"	Robert Mandell	September 10, 1995
2	"Jewel Quest"	Robert Mandell	September 17, 1995
Gwenevere (Starla), Princess of the Kingdom of Avalon, is destined to follow in the footsteps of her mother before her as a Jewel Rider. The time is about to come for her to receive the special Enchanted Jewel, the Sun Stone, in the traditional Friendship Ring ceremony and join her friends Tamara and Fallon. For her part, Sunstar, a young, winged unicorn, dreams of having a friend who would understand her. Meanwhile, Gwen's evil aunt Lady Kale plans to steal the seven Crown Jewels of the Kingdom that she needs to reign over Avalon forever. She finds the powerful Dark Stone and uses it to ambush and trap Merlin, banishing him into the perilous realm of Wild Magic after he refuses to surrender to her demands. The arriving Jewel Riders are able to secure the key to the magical Jewel Box where the Crown Jewels are kept, but Kale captures the Box itself along with Sunstar. In the second part, the girls, aided by their male counterparts known as The Pack, go on a mission to rescue Sunstar and take back the Jewel Box from Kale, who awaits them in her dark Castle Thornwood. Gwenevere agrees to surrender the key to the Jewel Box in exchange for Sunstar, but Merlin uses his remaining powers to thwart Kale at the last moment. The Seven Crown Jewels are scattered into their original lands, while the friends manage to free Sunstar and escape. Back in New Camelot, Gwen enters the Circle of Friendship to bond with Sunstar as her magical animal, sharing the Sun Stone with her in order to become a Jewel Rider. But with the Crown Jewels dispersed, the magic in Avalon is no longer stable, and so the quest to recover them begins.
3	"Travel Trees Can't Dance"	Christopher Rowley & Robin Young	September 24, 1995
Princess Gwenevere and Sunstar discover that the Travel Trees, which are used to "ride" the wild magic, are getting erratic. The two become separated from the other Jewel Riders, who are trying to track down the source of a wild magic outbreak in the Great Northwoods. It turns out that the Trees have a Crown Jewel stuck in their portal, which creates a wild magic dance floor for all the forest animals. Lady Kale, who had followed them, steals Gwen's dance partner and seizes the Jewel of the Great Northwoods to use it for evil, but the reunited Jewel Riders outwit Kale and reclaim it.
4	"Song of the Rainbow"	Mary Stanton & Robin Young	October 1, 1995
Tamara is caught in an enchantment when she plays a strange harp given to her for a performance at a craft fair. After Lady Kale attacks the fair and steals the harp, Gwen and Fallon embark on the quest to save Tamara from going into weird trances and learn what happened to the Rainbow Jewel upon returning to the land. They manage to get back the harp and again succeed in thwarting Kale when the music of the harp leads Tamara to a hidden magic cave in the Rainbow Falls, where they find the missing Crown Jewel and make it whole again.
5	"Wizard's Peak"	James Luceno & Robin Young	October 8, 1995
The Jewel Riders and the Pack go all together on a quest to the Crystal Cliffs to find the Crown Jewel of Burning Ice on the mountain of Wizard's Peak. When the group is attacked by Lady Kale, they separate into two groups. Fallon and the boys act as a bait to lead Kale away from Gwen and Drake, who together discover an entry into the mountain but soon find themselves trapped in a labyrinth of ice caverns on a romantic but dangerous adventure. Trying to locate the jewel, the Jewel Riders instead find the magical genie Guardian, intent on protecting the magical treasures of the ancient Hall of Wizards from both them and from Kale and her dweasels. With the help of Tamara and her animals, Gwen and Drake manage to escape and secure the third Crown Jewel.
6	"For Whom the Bell Trolls"	Marianne Meyer & Robin Young	October 15, 1995
The Pack finds a strange troll in the Misty Moors with the Misty Rose Crown Jewel. The troll uses it to turn the Pack into frogs and their wolves into lizards, but Josh escapes and contacts the Jewel Riders. Princess Gwenevere, Fallon and Tamara need to figure out the answers to the riddles of the troll in order to rescue the boys from being cooked and eaten. However, a mysterious talking swan steals the jewel and runs off in order to give it to Lady Kale, unaware of the wild magic havoc it is causing on its trail. The Jewel Riders chase after the swan to recover the jewel and manage to restore all the Misty Moors to normal. This also reverts the troll and the swan to their true forms of the local noble brothers.
7	"The Faery Princess"	Linda Shayne & Robin Young	October 22, 1995
A faery princess named Wisp, daughter of Faery King Odeon, searches for her lost flock of faery sheep. The sheep have become affected by wild magic, turning them into "biker-sheep" that run away from the hidden faery realm, crossing over through a rainbow portal into the Great Deserts of Avalon. Wisp gets lost following them and now needs help to find her way back home, so she enlists the help of the Jewel Riders. The girls manage to discover the passage into Faeryland, an alternate dimension where magic works differently. It turns out that Lady Kale had arrived there first and decided this is the perfect new kingdom for her to rule, but the Jewel Riders arrive in time to free the realm from Kale before she can master the faery magic, and they find the Desert Star Crown Jewel with the help of the Faery Princess. In the end, King Odeon agrees to unite his saved kingdom with Avalon under the protection of the Jewel Riders.
8	"Badlands"	Katherine Lawrence & Robin Young	October 29, 1995
Princess Gwenevere, Fallon, and Tamara escort a trading caravan through a canyon across the Badlands to the party at Castle Greenwood. In the caravan are Fallon's artisan parents, who disapprove of her having become a Jewel Rider instead of continuing their trade, leading Fallon to hate Gwen for forcing her to see them again. On the way, they are ambushed by Lady Kale and a band of outlaws working for her. When Gwen needs help, Fallon puts aside her anger and bravely saves her friend from Kale at almost the cost of her own life. Rescuing Gwen and protecting the caravan, Fallon proves to her parents that she excels as a Jewel Rider, and her parents come to accept her choice.
9	"Home Sweet Heart Stone"	Robin Young	November 5, 1995
Tamara is called by her parents to Heartland Animal Farm, housing various magic animals in their care, to examine a recently discovered prism fox. These are legendary animals from a world across the wild magic that they can enter at will and traverse through safely. Lady Kale having too heard the news and, believing it to be a great and powerful creature, she wants it as her new magic animal. Using enchanted bagpipes and other instruments, Kale plays a song to lure all the animals from the farm, only to discover that her prize is just a baby prism fox named Kit. Tamara and friends win a magic music battle against Kale and bring the animals back home, while Kit gets reunited with her parents and safely returns home.
10	"Love Struck"	James Mattson	November 12, 1995
Drake finds a talking magic sword in a tree at a carnival. Hungry for magic from the Enchanted Jewels of the Jewel Riders, the sword promises Drake that women will now fall madly in love with him. With the sword as his love coach, Drake tries some unusual magic love poems out on each of the Riders. The girls, sensing a trick, turn the tables on Drake by pretending to go along with "his" ruse. All of it then turns out to be a plot by the sword, which then almost drains away their magic, but the girls and Drake manage to win and force it back to its original state.
11	"Dreamfields"	Robin Young	November 19, 1995
Gwenevere runs off into the magical Dreamfields of the Great Plains after she becomes bored with her date with Drake at a nearby party. There, she becomes caught in a battle of dreams with Lady Kale, who is also trying to find the Crown Jewel. In a wild dream, Kale switches Gwen's Sun Stone with her Dark Stone, and thus a dream world is created in which Gwen has become evil, and her aunt has become good. Gwen must rely on her friends to help her fight the nightmares of the Dark Stone and to not let Kale get away with the Jewel of the Dreamfields.
12	"Revenge of the Dark Stone"	Robin Young & Christopher Rowley	November 26, 1995
Just when the Jewel Riders try to find the last Crown Jewel and complete the magic of Merlin's Jewel Box, Lady Kale disguises herself as Queen Anya and sneaks into the Crystal Palace. Kale seizes the Jewel Keep and with it the Jewel Box, as well as all the various other magic jewels stored there. She uses their powers to create an "antimagic" device and time-freeze all of New Camelot. When the Jewel Riders find the final Jewel, which was located in Morgana's old lair, the triumphant Kale magically transports it into her hands and strips them of their powers, proclaiming herself the new Queen of Avalon. (Cliffhanger ending.)
13	"Full Circle"	Robin Young & Christopher Rowley	December 3, 1995
(Continued from the previous episode.) With Avalon cast in darkness and the evil Lady Kale working to finally gain the power of the Crown Jewels, the Jewel Riders refuse to give up and return to the Friendship Ring to perform the Circle of Friendship ceremony again. With their Enchanted Jewels recharged, they enter the wild magic to find Merlin, helped by their friend Kit and guided by special creatures called magic gliders. Merlin reveals that the Crystal Palace itself is an Enchanted Jewel with great powers of goodness. While Merlin and Kale fight in the wild magic over the control of the key to Merlin's Jewel Box, the girls manage to release the magic of both the Crystal Palace and the Crown Jewels. With that, Kale ends up trapped and destroyed, and Avalon is restored to normal. However, it is revealed that Merlin has sacrificed his magic jewel to achieve that, and now he cannot come back.

=== Season 2 (1996) ===
No.	Title	Written by	Original release date
14	"Morgana"	Robert Mandell	September 8, 1996
The Jewel Riders learn about their newly enhanced magic. They decide to begin a new quest to give Merlin his powers back and return him home safely from his wild magic exile but are puzzled by continued wild magic outbreaks in Avalon. Unbeknownst to them, trouble is brewing inside the wild magic, where the evil ancient wizard Queen Morgana has been just restored by the Dark Stone, which she had created in the first place as her own a thousand years ago. But when she tries to use it again, Morgana accidentally summons Lady Kale and discovers that the Dark Stone is tuned to Kale now. Grudgingly, the two make a deal to work together against Merlin and the Jewel Riders, and Morgana sends Kale to Avalon to retrieve information about the powerful Wizard Jewels. The Jewel Riders return to the Hall of Wizards, where they encounter Kale and face Morgana's powers for the first time but are victorious with the help of the Guardian and find out about the Wizard Jewels.
15	"Shadowsong"	Robin Young	September 15, 1996
The Jewel Riders ride the wild magic looking for Wizard Jewels, but the Travel Trees cannot handle their new powers, and so they must travel on their own. Tamara finds a place of strong magic, and the Riders head there with magic gliders as their guides. But it turns out that Morgana had set a trap that sends Gwenevere, Sunstar, Fallon, Moondance, and Archie to a place where she can drain the magic of their Enchanted Jewels for herself. Tamara is sent to another place in the Wild Magic, where she makes friends with a frightened magical zebracorn named Shadowsong. The two form a strong bond and arrive to rescue the other Jewel Riders from Morgana just before she could steal their magic. By doing it, Shadowsong sacrifices himself but is then brought back to life when Tamara shares her Heart Stone with him.
16	"Fashion Fever"	Robin Young & Christopher Rowley	September 22, 1996
The annual charity fashion show opens at the Crystal Palace fairgrounds. It is Queen Anya's birthday, and King Jared wants to surprise her with a new dress. When he assigns Princess Gwenevere to handle this "secret mission", she ends up getting Fallon, Moondance, Tamara, and Tamara's baby animals involved in a comedy of errors as each girl and animal tries to complete the task. Meanwhile, Lady Kale sneaks into the show and creates a style-shifting dress that is too magical for Gwen to resist. When Gwen puts the dress on, she falls under Kale's hypnotic spell. It makes her lead her evil aunt into the Jewel Keep and even attack her own friends. A wild magic outbreak causes further chaos while Kale and Morgana learn the locations of the Wizard Jewels. It is up to Fallon and Drake to save the day when they manage to fight off Kale in sword combat and break the enchantment over Gwen.
17	"The Wizard of Gardenia"	James Luceno	September 29, 1996
In the magical gardens of the realm Gardenia, a gardener gnome fools the Jewel Riders into thinking that he is one of the Great Wizards from Avalon's past and capable of great magic. The gnome has the ability to sculpt magical topiary animals that transform into crystal creatures. When the Jewel Riders discover that the gnome is not what he appears to be (actually just a wizard's apprentice), they convince the gnome to help them retrieve a powerful Wizard Jewel from a dangerous place called the Sorcerer's Playground. He then helps the girls foil Kale and Morgana and win the first Wizard Jewel.
18	"Vale of the Unicorns"	Katherine Lawrence	October 6, 1996
The Jewel Riders journey to the enchanted lands of the unicorns to learn about the secret of their magic. These most magical animals in Avalon are in danger as the Unicorn Queen is missing and was kidnapped by Morgana to obtain the Unicorn Wizard Jewel. Moondance, daughter of the queen, must go to a magical labyrinth and perform a series of dangerous trials to determine whether she should become the new queen. However, this would also mean that Moondance could no longer be with the Jewel Riders and leave Fallon, which would force her to choose whether her loyalties are with the unicorns or with her best friend. Eventually, with the help of their friends, they manage not only to complete all the trials but also to win against Morgana, saving the unicorn queen in addition to getting the jewel.
19	"Prince of the Forest"	Robin Young	October 13, 1996
While searching for Faery Wraiths in the Forest of Arden, Princess Gwenevere finds romance with a very handsome and equally mysterious boy named Ian when they rescue each other in turns. However, he does not reveal to her the jewel he had found and how it enables him to transform into a human, as his true form is that of a wolfman-like beast. Now that Ian has met Gwen, he is worried that he may lose her love. When Lady Kale captures Ian and discovers his secret, she offers him a chance to remain human forever if he gives the jewel to her, but Ian rejects Kale and saves Gwen from her and Morgana. The princess then assures him that no matter what shape he takes, she will always be his friend. The girls win the third Wizard Jewel.
20	"The Wishing Jewel"	Laura Munro	October 20, 1996
Princess Gwenevere and Drake go on an adventure together but get lost in the misty walls that surround Avalon and discover a new magical but dangerous place outside the borders of the kingdom. Lost, they must work together to unravel a riddle told to them by the Travel Trees. Gwen and Drake must search for a magic jewel that will turn this land to goodness and extend the borders of Avalon before wild magic causes this place to vanish completely. Each discover half of the Wishing Jewel, but they can not figure out why it does not work quite right until they realize that neither of them have the entire jewel so they must work together in order to reassemble its pieces.
21	"The Jewel of the Sea"	Linda Shayne	October 27, 1996
The Jewel Riders embark on a great sea voyage to a magical island where a Wizard Jewel has landed. Sailing over the great Sea of Avalon, the girls discover an underwater kingdom of mermaid creatures. A merboy steals Tamara's Heart Stone and becomes human, but Tamara is transformed into a mermaid when she takes the Magic Pearl. The other Jewel Riders must find the merboy who has run off to the magic atoll and convince him to give the Heart Stone back to Tamara. Meanwhile, in the undersea lagoon gardens, Tamara confronts a big sea dragon guarding his territory. The adventure ends with the Jewel Riders obtaining the Jewel of the Sea.
22	"Trouble in Elf Town"	Laraine Arkow & Marlowe Weisman	November 3, 1996
A gang of three troll brothers find three new Enchanted Jewels in the wild magic and use them to try and steal elf magic from the Elf Woods. The Jewel Riders ride into town and engage in a Western-style showdown with the trolls to get their jewels and save the elves.
23	"Mystery Island"	Robin Young	November 10, 1996
Wild magic gliders tell the Jewel Riders a creature is crying out from somewhere in the Wild Magic, and Tamara convinces the Jewel Riders to go and rescue it. The girls ride into Wild Magic and discover a lost island. However, Lady Kale has also found this island and follows them to a hidden Wizard Jewel. The Jewel Riders find a giant creature who, amazingly, only responds to the baby animals. It is up to Cleo, Sugar, and Spike to save the day. In the end, the Jewel Riders find the Time Stone, Kale is bested once again, and their new friend returns to his own world.
24	"The Fortune Jewel"	Robin Young	November 17, 1996
A fortune teller named Esmerelda and her mysterious cat use the Fortune Jewel to tell people's fortunes. When the Jewel Riders have their fortunes read, a dark future is revealed to Princess Gwenevere that tells of the fall of the Crystal Palace and the rise of Morgana to rule Avalon. After Gwen and her friends fall into a magical trap set up by Lady Kale, the cat's secret is revealed: he is really the ancient wizard Derek, who lost his human form when he allied with Morgana against Merlin. With Esmerelda's and the reformed Derek's help, the Jewel Riders win again and capture the final Wizard Jewel.
25	"Lady of the Lake/Spirit of Avalon"	Robert Mandell & Christopher Rowley	November 24, 1996
Determined to prevent the Fortune Jewel's prophecy from coming true, the Jewel Riders travel to seek out the wisdom of the Lady of the Lake. They reach the shore of the mysterious Isle of Myst, only to find out that Kale and Morgana had arrived there first, as the two evil witches ambush the Jewel Riders and their mounts using the place's powerful magic to turn most of them and Archie into statues. Only Princess Gwenevere and Sunstar escape across a magical lake, where Gwen is given the Staff of Avalon so she can merge the collected Wizard Jewels into a new magical jewel for Merlin. With the help of the arriving Ian, Gwen manages to briefly combine the powers of the Wizard Jewels, finally defeating Lady Kale and saving their friends from peril. However, Morgana steals the full Jewel Box and disappears. (Cliffhanger ending.)
26	"The Last Dance/The One Jewel"	Robert Mandell & Christopher Rowley	December 12, 1996
(Continued from the previous episode.) Having dealt with Kale, the Jewel Riders and Ian find out that Morgana is heading to the center of wild magic. They journey there and meet up with Merlin as he confronts Morgana, who plans to forge the Wizard Jewels together and create the One Jewel that will control all the magic of Avalon, and witness the arrival of ghosts of several other evil wizards summoned by their jewels. Merlin's champions then fight against Morgana in a series of magical events to determine the future of Avalon and the fate of Merlin. They are leading the contest until Ian sacrifices himself to save Sunstar's life, after which Gwen manages to revive him with a kiss, but Morgana again steals the Jewel Box. However, the boys of the Pack save the day when they arrive to help Gwen use the Dark Stone to create the One Jewel for Merlin, who quickly uses it against Morgana and the wizard ghosts. He then happily reunites with his friends at long last.

== History ==
=== Development ===
Princess Gwenevere and the Jewel Riders was produced by the New York-based studios New Frontier Entertainment and Enchanted Camelot Productions for Bohbot Productions (later BKN) in 1995. The series was produced by much of the team behind the late 1980s science fiction cartoon The Adventures of the Galaxy Rangers, including the creator, co-writer and main director of both shows, Robert Mandell, after a long development process. Despite a similar theme and title, there was no connection with King Arthur and the Knights of Justice, which was Bohbot Entertainment's other Arthurian-inspired cartoon series that was produced in 1992–1993. It was originally supposed to be a cartoon adaptation of the Dragonriders of Pern series of fantasy novels by Anne McCaffrey but eventually went in a different direction.

The project, also involving the Canadian Studio B Productions, was renamed repeatedly in the course of its development, including to Enchanted Jewel Riders sometime in late 1994 or early 1995 and Princess Guinevere & Her Jewel Adventures in March 1995, before ultimately becoming Princess Gwenevere and the Jewel Riders (which was again retitled as Starla & the Jewel Riders for the export version). One of the several work-in-progress titles for the show was Enchanted Camelot, which was acquired as such in March 1994 by LIVE Entertainment (along with Skysurfer Strike Force and Highlander: The Animated Series). Enchanted Camelot had some major differences in its character design. The August 1994 draft script for the pilot episode of Enchanted Camelot ("Enchanted Quest", which would become "Jewel Quest") has been different in many aspects. (Note: Besides some different names (notably Guinevere "Gwen" for Gwenevere, Melody for Tamara, Alexanda "Alex" for Fallon, Amber for Sunstar, Midnight for Moondance, Queen Angelene for Queen Anya, and Shawn for Drake), this title also featured more major characters including Gwen's younger sister Tara and the Pack's fourth member Brand with his wolf Blazer, and apparently more violent/mature themes (for instance, Lady Kale says "...or die" instead of merely "...or be lost forever"). Camelot would also be the name of the entire land (and not Avalon), there would be the ten Stones of the Kingdom instead of the seven Crown Jewels, the dweasels were simply a pair of weasels, and the Dark Stone would be just a generic untuned Wild Magic enchanted jewel instead of Morgana's own.)

=== Production ===
According to The Buffalo News, "the production team intended for the Jewel Riders to serve as positive role models for girls." Bohbot's press kit for the series described it as "classic story-telling," incorporating "strong themes of friendship, teamwork, responsibility and conflict resolution." Each episode was constructed as an animated minimusical. The animation work on the series was done in Taipei, Taiwan by Hong Ying Animation Company Limited; one of the show's character designers was the future Emmy Award winner Rob Davies. The overall design was done by Jane Abbot, with Billy Zeats and Greg Autore serving as art directors. Enrico Casarosa was one of the storyboard artists. It was the first series scored by Louis Fagenson; though the French version's soundtrack was the work of Julie Zenatti. The show's CGI effects were created by Ian Tetrault in Autodesk 3ds Max and Adobe After Effects. The actress for Gwenevere/Starla was changed for the second season because Kerry Butler had to go to Canada for the musical Beauty and the Beast.

The show was not renewed for 1997, but a third season was rumored in 1998. The series' art director Greg Autore said about the making of the second season in 1995: "Bohbot wanted European distribution which required 26 [episodes]. So they made the next 13. They would have made more but were waiting to see how it succeeded. When the second set of episodes was turned on, the only two directions to start with were – 1) Search for wild magic jewels since the first set was all found 2) Use Morgana as the ultimate villainess instead of Lady Kale. Fortunately, director Robert Mandell was open to many of my suggestions. That second season had many episodes that grew from my concepts and a very rough storyline suggestion. Since the second season were not yet written and were rushed into production, this was where I had the most fun. Instead of just translating the characters and creating new fashions, I was free to create many new powers and adventures for the show. While I had input on many of the first episodes, I was now creating the basic storylines for entire episodes. Robert always had Morgana in the back of his head as a villainess he wanted to do. Now we could break out and expand the world of Avalon in different ways."

=== Broadcast ===
The series was first broadcast in the United States in 1995–1996 on Bohbot Entertainment's "Amazin'! Adventures" block. It had U.S. coverage of 80% and aired on 106 stations.

Internationally, it has been shown in more than 130 countries in the Starla version. Internationals airings, generally dubbed into local languages, have included those in Argentina on ATC (as Starla y los jinetes de las piedras preciosas), in Austria and Germany on RTL 2 in 1996 and on ORF 1 (as Starla und die Kristallretter), in Bulgaria (as Принцеса Старла и сияйните ездачи), in Canada on YTV (The Treehouse block) in 1996–1998, in Colombia on Teleantioquia, in Estonia on TV 1 (as Printsess Starla) in 1998, in Finland on Filmnet (as Starla ja taikajalokivet) in 1995, in France on France 3 in 1996 (as Princesse Starla et les Joyaux magiques), in India on Hungama TV, in Italy on Italia 1 (as Starla e le sette gemme del mistero) in 1999, in Korea (as 스탈라의 마법여행, "Starla's Magic Journey") on MBC in 1997, in Malaysia on TV2 in 1997, in Mexico on ZAZ and Azteca 7 (as Starla y los Jinetes de las Piedras Preciosas), in Norway (as Prinsesse Starla og Juvelridderne), in Panama on RPC, in Philippines on GMA Network (as Starla at ang mga Jewel Riders) in 1998, in Poland on RTL 7 in 1997 (as Starla i Jeźdzcy), in Portugal on SIC and Canal Panda (as Starlae as Jas Encantadas), in Romania on TVR1 (as Printesa Starla), in Russia on NTV-Plus: Detskyi Mir (as Принцесса Старла и повелители камней), in Slovakia on RiK in 2015 (as Princezná Starla a jazdci), in Serbia, Montenegro and Bosnia & Herzegovina (as Старла и јахачи драгуља), in Spain under the titles of La princesa Starla (TVE1 in 1996) and Starla i les amazones de les joies (Catalan language Super3 in 2001 and TV3 / K3 in 2001 and 2006), in Sweden on Canal+, FilmNet and TV 3 (as Starla och juvelriddarna), in Thailand on iTV in 1997, in Turkey on TRT1 and Star TV (as Starla and Mücevher Şövalyeleri), and in the United Kingdom on GMTV in the mid-1990s and re-run on Pop Girl in 2009. It was acquired by Fox Kids Europe in 2000 (Fox Kids UK had aired it in 1996 before the rest of Fox Kids Europe in 2000).

=== Home releases ===
There have been four VHS releases in America by Family Home Entertainment in January 1996 covering only part of the first season and consisting of Jewel Quest (episodes "Jewel Quest Part 1" and "Jewel Quest Part 2"), Wizard's Peak ("Wizard's Peak" and "Travel Trees Can't Dance") and For Whom the Bell Trolls ("For Whom the Bell Trolls" and "The Faery Princess"), followed by Full Circle ("Revenge of the Dark Stone" and "Full Circle") in July 1996. Leading up to the release date, Hasbro and Toys "R" Us offered an episode from the program on video for free with the pre-order purchase of a related toy. The UK (Carlton Video 1997), Serbian (Vidcom 1996, "Prizor" dub), and French (Warner Home Video 2000) VHS releases include some episodes from the second season.

In 2005, the rights for the DVD retail in the United States and Canada were given to Digiview Entertainment, which reserved the right to release the show on DVD. They announced plans to release the first two volumes in 2006 and subsequent volumes over the course of the next year. However, the only DVD released by Digiview was Wizard's Peak, containing the first five episodes of the show and available in Walmart stores. Though it says "Princess Gwenevere & the Jewel Riders" on the cover, the show on the DVD is the international version (Starla & the Jewel Riders); in the case of both the cover and the show itself, the Starla-style title fonts (similar to the title fonts in Gargoyles) are used in the logo, and the disc appears to be region-free. The complete first season was released on DVD in France in 2008 and dubbed into French. The series was also released on DVD in Serbia in 2007 and 2008 with a Serbian dub. Pidax Film released the German dub together with the English original on DVD in 2021.

=== Streaming media ===
In 2008–2009, the series has been available to be watched for free in a streaming media form on the Lycos Cinema service and later Kidlet.tv; while it was titled as Princess Gwenevere and the Jewel Riders, it was actually the Starla version. In 2009, the show was also made freely available for users of the Internet service SyncTV (available online from the browser for the American users and downloadable for watching for the others). In 2011, the Starla version became available for streaming through Netflix for the users in the United States, expanded to the entire first season in 2012.

The first two episodes ("Jewel Quest") have been put on YouTube by 41 Entertainment, a new company founded by the producer Allan J. Bohbot. In 2018, most of the episodes of the Starla version have been released in high quality and wide aspect ratio through the subscription service Watch It Kid!. It has been since also made available on other streaming platforms, including Apple TV, Amazon Prime Video, Tubi, and PeacockTV. All episodes of the Gwenevere version in VHS quality have been released on 41 Entertainment's official Amazin' Adventures YouTube channel for free throughout 2024.

== Merchandise ==
According to Robert Mandell, the show was originally commissioned by Hasbro through reverse toyetic to accompany their line of toys (albeit only in the form of vague outline and the creators developed the plot and the characters). However, according to Variety, Bohbot "took the Princess Gwenevere concept to Hasbro Toys, which after extensive market research, put itself enthusiastically behind the project, collaborating in equal partnership with Bohbot on the development of the property." A national "Watch and Win" contest in February 1996 offered viewers the opportunity to win Princess Gwenevere videos and toys if they mailed in the correct code words from the show. The Hasbro/Kenner toy line had two series of action figures for girls ages 4 and up. The first series contains Princess Gwenevere (Starla), Sun Power Gwenevere, Tamara, Fallon, Drake, Lady Kale, Sunstar, and Moondance; and the second series contains Deluxe Princess Gwenevere (Starla), Deluxe Tamara, and Deluxe Fallon. According to Time to Play, the action figures' sales "bombed". In the fall of 1996, Hasbro planned to reintroduce revamped versions of the figures as well as new characters from the animated series. The toys had a television advertising campaign featuring a 30-second commercial.

Other merchandise included a series of collectible trading cards released by the Upper Deck Company in 1996, a "play-a-sound" children's illustrated sound book by Nancy L. McGill based on the first two episodes and published by Publications International that same year, Panini Group collectible stickers, a makeup kit, Happy Meal and Long John Silver's premium toys, lunchboxes, clothing items, and such. There were unrealized plans to produce a video game adaptation and the series' theme song was included on Mastermix's TV SETS CD 14.

== Comics ==
In 2023, nearly three decades after the end of the television series, licensed Princess Gwenevere & the Jewel Riders comic books (advertised as graphic novels) were announced to be released by the Mad Cave Studios imprint Maverick. According to the cartoon's executive producer and copyright holder Allen Bohbot from 41 Entertainment, they are going "to reflect a modern take of the Arthurian legends with a more dramatized version [and] will target an older audience," and it "may well serve as a foundation of story and design content for potential new YA animated project."

The comics are set in their own timeline, following an alternative version of the events of the show's first season (with Merlin safely back in Avalon) and with elements inspired by the second season (like the girls having the mermaid magic). According to the official premise, "Avalon is in peril and the evil Lady Kale has returned. Only through the power of magic and friendship can Gwen, Fallon, and Tamara save Avalon and restore order to their beloved kingdom."

The series, written by Jordie Bellaire and illustrated by Koi Carreon, began with Volume 1 published on 28 May 2024: "While the girls remain friends, things are not as they once were. Gwenevere - once the leader of the Jewel Riders - has had to take a step back from her true passion, being a Jewel Rider and protecting Avalon from evil, in order to step into a new role as the future queen. Fallon, holder of the Moon Stone now leads the Pack--an elite group of Avalon's protectors, a role once held by Gwen's fiance. Tamara trains under Merlin to better harness the power of her Heart Stone but wonders where she–and her powers–truly belong. When Merlin begins acting oddly, it's a sign that evil Wild Magic has returned to the kingdom--and so has a foe the Jewel Riders thought they'd once vanquished. With her kingdom, friends, and magic on the line, Gwenevere must choose between the life she loves and knows as a Jewel Rider and her newfound duties."

Volume 2, The Quest for Avalon, was announced to be released on August 19, 2025: "When we last saw Gwen and her friends Fallon and Tamara, they had successfully defeated Lady Kale–or so they thought. With Merlin gone, strange things and wild magic outbreaks have begun occurring about the kingdom. Is Kale still among them? Gwen and her friends must dig deep to find the power within each of them to defeat a new enemy and restore balance to the magic of Avalon. But their friendship is tested in new ways as their responsibilities continue to shift and change."

Princess Gwenevere & King Arthur, a crossover with King Arthur & the Knights of Justice, was to be released on the Free Comic Book Day in May 2025, to be written by Jordie Bellaire and Joseph Corallo and illustrated by different artists. According to its premise, "Merlin is lost in the Wild Magic and finds himself unable to defeat Morgana once and for all. Using his last strength, he summons brave heroes from across the lands–bringing the Jewel Riders and the Knights of Justice together for the first time." It was withdrawn from all distribution. In June 2026, it was released as a bonus content in the omnibus edition Princess Gwenevere x King Arthur Collection – Vol. 1.

== Reception ==
=== Ratings ===
Princess Gwenevere and the Jewel Riders was reported to be "struggling with a 0.6 national Nielsen rating among girls 2–11" in 1995. Bohbot hoped heavy promotion of the merchandise products would raise awareness of the show. Nevertheless, it was the most popular of the first-run cartoon series in the 1995 edition of Bohbot's "Amazin' Adventures II" weekend syndicated package. Daily Herald reported it was "the number one syndicated television show in the U.S. among girls 6 to 11" in 1996. It was reported that Starla became "a huge hit" when it was shown in France. First broadcast there in April 1996, it reached the top of the channel France 3's ratings in children's time slots with a 77.6% market share average, proving "that action, knights and fantastic stories work very well with boys, too."

=== Critical reception ===
The show's critical reception has been mixed and highly divisive, but for the most part positive. According to Video Librarian, "a cross between She-Ra: Princess of Power and the saccharine My Little Pony, the Princess Gwenevere and the Jewel Riders series is standard Saturday morning cartoon fodder." Scott Moore of The Buffalo News compared the "underwhelming" Princess Gwenevere to the "overhyped" Sailor Moon. Retrospectively, Rob Bricken of Topless Robot ranked Princess Gwenevere fifth on his 2009 list of "most ridiculous" adaptations of Arthurian legend, commenting that shows like that "were clearly made to take advantage of a small, low-aiming school of girl-oriented action cartoons, but it ultimately lost out to a slightly more tolerable Japanese import." Jewel Riders was arguably the show that was most obviously directly inspired by She-Ra among the many similar works in the wake of the latter, including Sailor Moon.

In Arthurian Legends on Film and Television, Bert Olton opined that "Princess Gwenevere and the Jewel Riders combines all the worst elements of minimalist cartooning, modern commercialism and vacuous storytelling with a tiny portion of Arthurian legend." In The Middle Ages in Popular Culture: Medievalism and Genre, Clare Bradford and Rebecca Hutton described it as "a disappointing production that is markedly sexist and racist with only tenuous links to the Arthuriad." Kathleen Richter of Ms. called the show "so sexist and racist" for how it has "the powerful female figure demonized as evil and the main character blonde and blue-eyed."

On the other hand, Samantha Kelly of the Manchester Metro News called it as "a real gem" of a fairy tale style good-versus-evil story for young girls, who in her opinion would strongly identify with its beautiful royal heroine on her quest against the menace of Lady Kale, praising the show as "full of action and fantasy" and featuring "excellent" character animation. Bustle's Lucia Peters wrote, "Princess Gwenevere and the Jewel Riders followed a pretty classic 'special kid and special friends have awesome powers and must defeat the forces of darkness' format. The fact that it met at the intersection of horses, sparkly things, and girl power, though, means that it holds a special place in many '90s kids' hearts." AV Club's Caroline Siede wrote that she was "obsessed" by the show as "a child of the '90s". In King Arthur in America, authors Alan and Barbara Lupack that the show, "with its strong female heroine, is interesting in part because it is designed primarily for girls." In Adapting the Arthurian Legends for Children, Barbara Lupack added that it successfully "translated the Arthurian story into an idiom easily accessible to preteen female viewers and (...) appealed to its young audience." Retrospectively, France's Fun Radio included it among the 14 "probably the best" cartoons of the 1990s as "one of the quintessential girl series".

Contrary to above mentioned criticism of perceived sexism and racism by some, some others noted the show for its positive values for its intended audience. Keith Busby remarked in Arthurian Literature that "the series appeals to young girls and teaches them the values of friendship." According to Billboard, the plot of this "popular" series, "specifically targeting young girls", features "life lessons to be learned along the way, and the program in general promotes brains over brawn." Syfy's Brittany Vincent wrote about how this "pleasant and kitschy relic of the past" had been a "perfect fodder for young girls like me looking for strong women and heroes to imitate."

According to Kirkus Reviews review of the first volume of the comic book series, its "story captures the animated television series' essence while making subtle contemporary updates (...) There's an unmistakable positivity to the narrative, which encourages openness and demonstrates that vulnerability isn't always a weakness. (...) Sparkling characters highlight this diverting illustrated fantasy tale."

== Legacy ==
Natoo's jewel line Joyau Magique (Magic Jewel) was inspired by Jewel Riders, her favourite childhood cartoon. A music band named Jewel Riders was formed in Los Angeles in 2022.

=== Spiritual sequel ===
In 2001, author Rachel Roberts began writing her contemporary fantasy book series Avalon: Web of Magic inspired by and loosely based on the show. It borrows various concepts and names (including even some of the episode titles), as well as lyrics from some of the songs used in Jewel Riders. As of 2012, the series consists of 12 novels, as well as a three-volume graphic novel titled Avalon: The Warlock Diaries.

A film adaptation of Avalon: Web of Magic was announced in 2012, but was never released. An Avalon: Web of Magic animated series project was revealed in 2017, but it too was never released.

== See also ==
- Amethyst, Princess of Gemworld
- Lady Lovely Locks
- LoliRock
- Star vs. the Forces of Evil
- Steven Universe
- Tenko and the Guardians of the Magic
- W.I.T.C.H.
- Wildfire
- Winx Club
- Wonder Woman and the Star Riders
