= The Adventures of the Galaxy Rangers =

Animated television space western

- DVD box cover
- Genre: Space Western; Action/adventure
- Created by: Robert Mandell
- Voices of: Robert Bottone; Alexander Marshall; Maia Danziger; Corinne Orr; Laura Dean; Jerry Orbach; Earl Hammond; Ray Owens; Hubert Kelly; Doug Preis; Henry Mandell
- Composers: Phil Galdston, John Van Tongeren, Peter Wetzler
- Country of origin: United States
- Original language: English
- No. of seasons: 1
- No. of episodes: 65

Production
- Executive producer: Abe Mandell
- Producers: Robert Mandell; Bob Chrestani
- Running time: 30 minutes
- Production companies: Transcom Media, Inc. (Production); Gaylord Entertainment Company (Production); Tokyo Movie Shinsha (Animation)

Original release
- Network: First-run syndication
- Release: September 14 – December 11, 1986

The Adventures of the Galaxy Rangers or simply Galaxy Rangers, is an American animated space Western television series created by Robert Mandell and produced by Transcom Media, Inc. and Gaylord Entertainment Company. It was broadcast in syndication between 1986 and 1989. The series combines sci-fi stories with traditional wild west themes. It is one of the first anime-style shows produced mainly in the United States, although the actual animation was done by the Japanese animation studio Tokyo Movie Shinsha. At the time it aired, The Adventures of the Galaxy Rangers was considered a revolutionary children's show.

== Plot ==
"In 2086, two peaceful aliens journeyed to Earth seeking our help. In return, they gave us the plans for our first hyperdrive allowing mankind to open the doors to the stars. We have assembled a team of unique individuals to protect Earth and our allies. Courageous pioneers committed to the highest ideals of justice and dedicated to preserving law and order across the new frontier. These are The Adventures of the Galaxy Rangers!"

— opening narration.

The show is set in the future, some time after the year 2086, when two aliens from the planets Andor and Kirwin travel to Earth to search for allies against the expansionist Crown Empire led by the Queen of the Crown. In return for the help, the two aliens gave mankind construction plans for a hyperdrive device. After this key event in human history, interstellar travel flourished and a huge number of colonies emerged in distant star-systems. Alongside the growth of human activities in space, criminal activities also grew, and the new colonies required defense against various threats, including the Crown Empire. A group known as "BETA" (Bureau for Extra-Terrestrial Affairs) was founded to cope with these tasks, with a "Ranger" division being a part of it. BETA is shown to be the major military and exploratory arm of Earth. The organization's headquarters are on Earth. BETA sustains several bases on and around Earth, such as the Longshot Research Facility in the Grand Canyon and the BETA space station in Earth's orbit.

Most of the colonies portrayed in the show specialized in either agriculture or mining "star stones". Many of the planets on the show have names that evoke ideas of a Western setting, Nebraska, Mesa, Ozark, and Prairie being a few.

After the catalyst first episode, "Phoenix", where one of the main characters, Zachary Foxx, loses his wife to the Queen of the Crown, he puts together a group called the Galaxy Rangers, dedicated to providing law and order across the new frontier, ultimately trying to get rid of the Crown Empire. Each ranger is equipped with an experimental piece of tech called the Series-5 to boost natural abilities.

The Series-5 Brain Implant, or S5, is implied to be the closest mankind will ever get to merging with cybernetics. The S5 implant enables a dramatic boost of innate abilities due to its unique conversion of bio-electrical power generated by alpha radiation stored within the badges worn by the Galaxy Rangers.

The Crown Empire, also known as the "Crown", is ruled by the tyrannical Queen of the Crown, who controls a large number of planets in a vast section of the galaxy, all of which she rules as a cruel tyrant. The Queen controls her empire using creatures called Slaver Lords with whom she has a psychic link. Slaver Lords derive their power from the psychic energy of other beings. After the Empire encountered humans, the Queen discovered that they were more suitable for energy extraction than any other previously encountered species.

== Characters ==
=== Zachary Foxx ===
Zachary Foxx (voiced by Jerry Orbach) is the captain of the series 5 Rangers. He was seriously injured in a battle with a space Pirate named Captain Kidd, resulting in the left side of his body being replaced with bionics. Foxx's bionics allow him to fire blasts of energy with his left arm and gives him extraordinary strength. Foxx is married and a father of two; his wife's mind was kidnapped by the Queen of the Crown and is contained in a "psychocrystal".

=== Shane Gooseman ===
Shane "Goose" Gooseman was genetically produced in a test tube as part of a government genetic experiment to create a group of enhanced mutant soldiers known as "Supertroopers". A civilian adviser dosed the Supertroopers with a gas meant to speed up their mutation and make them more powerful, but had the side effect of making the Supertroopers more aggressive and mentally unstable. Goose was at the firing range at the time, and thus avoided the gas, thereby becoming the only remaining unaffected trooper. The other troopers were cryogenically imprisoned, but some escaped. Goose was given the option to avoid cryogenic freezing on the condition that he join the Galaxy Rangers and hunt down the escaped Supertroopers. Goose's bionic implants allow him limited control over his body's molecules giving him the ability to heal, absorb energy, and transform his body to adapt to various environmental conditions.

=== Niko ===
Niko is an archaeologist specializing in ancient cultures. She possesses innate psionic abilities, which allow her to create shields, telekinetically lift objects, and perform clairvoyance. Niko's implant acts as an amplifier, boosting her psionic abilities and increasing their range to several light years. She can also generate a shield of ambient energy which will dramatically drain her implant, but can be augmented by touching the other rangers and drawing power from them.

Niko was born on the colony Alspeth and raised on the planet Xanadu after Alspeth was destroyed. At the age of 19, she left Xanadu to return to her people and joined the Galaxy Rangers. After the academy, she was accepted into the experimental Series 5 program. She was later assigned to the Series 5 Rangers as their mystic and archaeological expert.

=== Walter Hartford ===
Walter "Doc" Hartford is a swashbuckling character who fights with a sword, a gun, and his fists. He is a computer genius who, along with the BETA Scientist 'Q-Ball', is responsible for most of the automated systems that the Galaxy Rangers use. His series 5 implants allow him to control any computer system through the use of "programs", which appear as holographic geometric shapes that he can communicate with. Doc's Computer Diagnostic Unit (CDU) acts as a focus for his implant abilities.

Doc was born in Jamaica to wealthy parents, and was educated in private school. He left to join the Ranger Corps after he signed up with some biochemical corporations to help them produce better computer programs, but found out that his skills were not being challenged.

== Episodes ==
No.	Title	Written by	Original release date
1	"Phoenix"	Robert Mandell	September 14, 1986
The Galaxy Rangers are an intergalactic law enforcement agency. Ranger Zachary Foxx is assigned on a mission to observe a group of humans who have established a home on the planet Kirwin. They work alongside Kiwi and Andorians to design a force shield to protect Kirwin from alien invaders. Foxx travels with his wife, Eliza, and their two children, as well as Alien diplomats Zozo and Waldo. En route, they are captured by alien criminals commanded by Captain Kidd. Kidd holds the captives in exchange for a reward from Queen of the Crown, leader of a galactic empire. She wishes to have human specimens for her psychocrystal experiments, to create Slaverlords. The diplomats help Zachary and his children escape. However, Aliza is kidnapped by Kidd. At Earth, in the headquarters of the Rangers BETA (Bureau for Extra-Terrestrial Affairs), Zachary's injured body is reconstructed with bionics and a computer chip is installed in his brain. Commander Walsh BETA agrees with Zachary that BETA needs Rangers with special abilities to fight the alien invaders. These Rangers use an experimental "Series 5" computer implant to enhance their individual abilities. Zachary swears to rescue Aliza from the Queen.
2	"New Frontier"	Robert Mandell	October 29, 1986
The Ranger's first assignment takes them to planet Tortuna to find information on the missing humans. The Rangers go to Tortuna, looking for Captain Kidd, to find out what happened to Eliza. After escaping the Queen's trap on Tortuna, Kidd leads them to the Queen's asteroid. They are captured by the Queen, but they manage to escape with Eliza's comatose body and rescue all the humans intact. However, the other half of her psychocrystal is still in the hands of the Queen, so Eliza is placed in stasis until they can retrieve the crystal.
3	"Tortuna"	Christopher Rowley	September 15, 1986
The Rangers search for Eliza's psychocrystal. Geezi is a snitch, and he has one of the Queen's memory birds (so she does not use disks for data storage and retrieval). The Rangers go back to Tortuna (this time undercover as Zanguils) to buy the bird from Geezi, and they learn about how the Queen has decimated the Gherkin race along the way.
4	"Chained"	Robert Mandell	September 18, 1986
Goose is assigned to transport MaCross - a dangerous criminal and leader of the Black Hole Gang, to stand trial on Earth. The Black Hole Gang has other ideas, as MaCross apparently hid a stash of Starstones before he was captured, and they want the stones and MaCross back.
5	"Smuggler's Gauntlet"	Brian Daley	October 7, 1986
Top secret DNA formulas used by the World Federation in their short lived Supertrooper program have been stolen. The smugglers plan to sell the "Supertrooper juice" to the Queen. In deep space action Goose saves Zachery by giving him his helmet when Zachery's is damaged. Goose must then use his super biodefenses to save himself from the vacuum of space. The Galaxy Rangers track down the stolen goods to Tortuna, where they go up against the smugglers in a showdown.
6	"Mistwalker"	Lucia Robson	October 22, 1986
Zach and Zozo are sent to planet Biste-Fenokee to check up on Audra Miles, an anthropologist studying an aboriginal species on a world where nature is in complete control and technology does not operate properly.
7	"Wildfire"	Henry Beck	September 23, 1986
On a transport ship carrying unstable isotopes, the Rangers get a distress call from the infamous Cody.
8	"Ghost Station"	Lance Strate	October 8, 1986
An artificial planetoid is detected on a collision course with Earth. The Rangers and the ambassadors head out to try to stop it and find a heavily armed station that is completely empty - empty that is except for the ghosts of the civilization that built it.
9	"One Million Emotions"	Tom De Haven	September 19, 1986
The Rangers are in charge of security at an intergalactic art show where a Poe mutant Sensation doll is stolen. The doll is dangerous to humans, indeed to everyone but a Poe, as it holds the emotions of the artist.
10	"Traash"	Christopher Rowley	October 2, 1986
An extremely aggressive, insectoid new race, the Traash, is blowing up everything in its path (including the Crown destroyers) and Captain Kidd is the only one who knows anything about them. All he has to do is give a little whistle.
11	"Mindnet"	Brian Daley	September 16, 1986
Killbane breaks into Longshot and steals one of the components of Mindnet, a device that induces psi abilities, for the Queen of the Crown.
12	"Tune-Up"	John Rawlins	October 20, 1986
Q-ball's lab is studying a slew of alien devices, where Buzzwang and little Zach are assigned to do an inventory - except that one of the devices is not quite as inert as it was supposed to be.
13	"Space Sorcerer"	Robert Mandell	September 22, 1986
Niko gets a distress call from Ictar, a Basuti. The last Space Sorcerer has taken over their planet and is forcing them to dig for Starstones. The Rangers confront him and he disappears in a cloud of smoke, vowing revenge.
14	"Progress"	John Rawlins	October 23, 1986
The Rangers receive a distress call from a planet with more water than land, so they, and the dolphins, Icarus and Winter, are sent to investigate. Three aliens have restarted an abandoned factory that was polluting the one major land mass, which is making the planet's aquatic natives sick.
15	"Queen's Lair"	Christopher Rowley	September 17, 1986
The Queen has built a cannon that can destroy a planet, and is trying to hold the League hostage with it. The Rangers are sent in to work with the resistance group on the planet and destroy the weapon. The resistance group is led by Wirwar, whose family is held hostage by the Queen and who tries to free them by handing the Rangers to the Queen. Despite that, they succeed in destroying the Queen's weapon but have to escape in a ship which they discover only has five minutes worth of oxygen.
16	"The Ax"	Dan Fiorella	October 1, 1986
Old Roy the prospector uncovers an ancient civilization, so Niko and Doc are called in and wind up battling an ancient android programmed to protect the city.
17	"Shaky"	Unknown	September 25, 1986
Roy and Burro are back, this time on Shaky, a planet with much seismic activity, but possibly a big starstone deposit, and the Black Hole Gang wants the claim.
18	"Space Moby"	Dan Fiorella	September 24, 1986
The Rangers are sent to rid an asteroid belt of giant space whales. But they end up in the middle of a fight between "SpacePeace" and a madman, consumed with a vengeful desire to destroy the whales forever.
19	"Scarecrow"	Christopher Rowley	October 31, 1986
A malevolent spirit is harvested along with the crops on the planet of Grana, and it is up to the Galaxy Rangers Niko and Goose to stop the "Scarecrow" before he sows the community's destruction.
20	"The Power Within"	James Luceno	September 26, 1986
Nimrod grabs the Rangers out of hyperspace, and makes them play his version of the most dangerous game, without their badges. They have to make do as normal, human Rangers.
21	"Games"	Robert Mandell	October 9, 1986
Lazarus Slade is supplying the General with warriors for his games by kidnapping. He grabbed Doc off an automated space station, and Goose is sent undercover to find out what is going on. Maya has survived the games thus far, and switches sides to help Goose and Doc put Slade and the General out of commission. The General becomes fascinated with Gooseman, believing him to be a metamorph, and the perfect candidate for his cloned army.
22	"Showtime"	John Rawlins	October 14, 1986
The Kiwis and Andorians, on their way back from a Federation Conference, discover The Orion Flying Circus and Rodeo Show, led by Wild Bill Krebb, and have no idea that they are meant to be part of the act.
23	"Psychocrypt"	Robert Mandell & Christopher Rowley	September 30, 1986
The Queen of the Crown uses her half of the Eliza Foxx psychocrystal to lure Zachary to her Psychocrypt, a facility in a remote area of space. Zachary is captured and used to create the most power psychocrystal ever. Against orders from Commander Walsh, the rest of the Series 5 team must track down Zach with the help of Geezi the Pedulant and rescue him from the clutches of the Queen.
24	"Renegade Rangers"	Cy Voris	September 29, 1986
The Rangers pretend to go bad in order to infiltrate the Black Hole Gang, who are going to try to attack the Longshot research facility. Goose is charged with keeping Daisy O'Mega, the leader of the group of outlaws, distracted after she makes it plain that she is attracted to him. They are planning a trap at Longshot, but MaCross, who wanted Daisy for himself, and hates Goose anyway, finds out the plot and mucks up that plan.
25	"Edge of Darkness"	Robert Mandell	October 3, 1986
The Rangers are leading a strike team against the Black Hole Gang at Entropy's Edge, a black hole or wormhole of some sort. During the battle Goose, after knocking out the power source of the Black Hole hideout, is dragged into the black hole. His charge goes nuts and finally he gets spit out at the other end of the wormhole into the Empty Zone. He crashes on Ozark and wakes, unable to control his morphing. Drawn by Annie Oh's cries for help as she is attacked by a Dinosaur and Goose morphs into a monster in order to save her. Annie tries to shield him from the people of Ozark, who have no tolerance for off-worlders, until the other Rangers track him down.
26	"The Magnificent Kiwi"	Robert Mandell	October 21, 1986
The Queen hires Killbane to destroy the Kiwi defense shield because she has learned that the remaining members of the Gherkin race are hiding there.
27	"Armada"	Brian Daley	October 6, 1986
Lazarus Slade has outfitted the Queen's armada with hyperdrives, and they are advancing on Earth. Using her powers, Niko is able to find out that the Starstones powering the drives were manufactured by Captain Kidd. Goose and Niko track down Kidd at the old homestead, while Zach and the BETA fleet try to find a weakness in the Crown Armada.
28	"Birds of a Feather"	James Luceno	October 13, 1986
Miller and Moxy, who has apparently gotten over touching the Poe Mutant sensation doll, sneak into Longshot, after the Supertrooper Juice. This episode has the entire rogue's gallery chasing after Bubblehead the Memory Bird, who has accidentally been downloaded with the Supertrooper Juice formula. The Queen wants it; Jackie Subtract wants it; Daisy O'Mega wants it; the Black Hole Gang wants it; and especially, the Rangers want it back.
29	"Stargate"	Christopher Rowley	October 10, 1986
BETA gets a message from the rebels on Wollcam. It seems the Queen is back, and is looking for a legendary Stargate, a wormhole leading to a parallel universe. The only person who seems to know anything about it is a Captain Weege, who is the sole crew of a submarine. Weege wants nothing to do with the Rangers, though he does take an interest in Niko. It is an uneasy partnership, as Captain Foxx and Captain Weege can't seem to decide at first who is in charge.
30	"Buzzwang's Folly"	Dan Fiorella & John Rawlins	November 18, 1986
Lazarus Slade has once again teamed up with the Queen of the Crown, and once again they plan an assault on Earth. This time, however, the Queen gives him 500 Plagos for the attack. Plagos lack the good sense God gave sheep. But they might have been successful if they had not come up against BETA's brilliant defensive minds. Thanks to an android double of Premier Dutch dispensing knockout gas, Buzzwang, his food dispensing android buddies, the Ambassadors and the Kiwi kids are minding the store, and it is up to them to save the world.
31	"Heart of Tarkon"	Robert Mandell	October 15, 1986
Doc and Niko are sent to Maya's homeworld Tarkon, to prevent a treaty between King Spartos, Maya's father and the Queen of the Crown. In the midst of all this, the mystery of the Heart, a giant computer hidden away in a mountain, is introduced. While Niko investigates the computer with the help of an ancient Shaman, Doc gets to play dress up and even use those fencing lessons he took at Miss Abercrombie's charm school.
32	"Murder on the Andorian Express"	Dan Fiorella & John Rawlins	October 16, 1986
Niko and Doc are on board the luxury liner The Christie trying to track down an assassin hired by the Crown without the use of their implants, because their charges were depleted through foul play.
33	"Lady of Light"	Laurel Davis	October 17, 1986
Mogul the Space Sorcerer summons a powerful entity from a pneumonic universe in order to provide him a power source that would make him the most powerful sorcerer in the galaxy. However, he loses control of the entity, and the Lady of Light crash-lands on a planet in the frontier. She loses her crown of power and begins to lose molecular cohesion. If she does not return home soon, the resulting explosion could destroy two universes. Goose, Niko, and Waldo try to avert disaster. Naturally, Mogul and Larry follow to stake their claim on a pneumonic power source.
34	"Mothmoose"	John Rawlins	October 27, 1986
Wild Bill Krebb and his gang are at it again, this time on Kirwin, where they trick a guide into showing them the home of the legendary Mothmoose. Yes, it is in fact a flying moose. According to legend, the harvest depends on the appearance of this creature, and the Kiwi want it back. So, when BETA deems the recovery of the Mothmoose too far down on their emergency list to merit help from the S5's, it is up to Zozo, Waldo, and the Kiwi kids to get it back.
35	"Natural Balance"	Robert Mandell	October 24, 1986
Niko, Doc and Buzz take Zozo, Zach Jr. and the Kiwi kids on a field trip to Mistwalker's home world, and find out the supposedly perfect natural balance has been tipped by Slade.
36	"Scarecrow's Revenge"	Mick Farren	November 10, 1986
Niko and Goose travel to Tarkon after being summoned by Maya when entire villages of frozen, lifeless people are discovered. The Scarecrow is behind it and he is seeking immortality once again. The Scarecrow takes over Maya's mind which gives Niko the perfect excuse to have a good old scrap with her.
37	"In Sheep's Clothing"	James Luceno	November 3, 1986
Lykans, a highly intelligent wolf-like species, are being blamed for the deaths of Bovo 6 cattle on Prairie. Audra Miles, who has been living with the Lykans, calls on Niko to help her prove the Bovo corporation is at fault, and she and Doc are sent to investigate.
38	"Marshmallow Trees"	Robert Mandell & Christopher Rowley	November 20, 1986
While introducing Kiwi marshmallow trees to the planet Grana, the planet's two suns have an adverse effect on the trees, making them complete their entire cycle of growth in one night, not to mention being 100 times their normal size. The planet will be overrun by the trees if a special breed of locusts are not used to destroy the crop. However, the residents of Grana do not think that the locusts are a good idea at all. It turns into a free for all, as everyone commandeers everyone else's vehicle trying to stop the Rangers from releasing the locusts.
39	"Shoot-Out"	Robert Mandell	October 30, 1986
The Queen of the Crown holds a gunslinging contest, with Eliza's crystal as the prize.
40	"Bronto Bear"	Christopher Rowley	October 28, 1986
MaCross wants to own the Texacota valley, because it has oil fields, and decides the best way to go about this is to re-enact a Godzilla movie, using the giant sleeping Bronto Bear, and substituting Texacota for Tokyo. The bear, decidedly unhappy about having its winter hibernation disturbed is on a direct course to the city, and it's up to the rangers to give the big lug a sedative and get it back to the Arctic where it belongs while the law enforcement in Texacota handle crowd control.
41	"Invasion"	John Rawlins	November 4, 1986
Zach cannot make it in time to "The Albert Einstein School for Gifted Youngsters Science Fair," and his daughter Jessie is upset when big brother Zach Jr. comes in his stead, sure that Dad will be there was soon as he can. However, the fair is suddenly overrun by tiny cowboys and indians armed with mini-blasters, and it is up to the kids to save the day from this toy invasion.
42	"Rogue Arm"	Mick Farren	November 5, 1986
The Queen launches a special psychocrystal through hyperspace. It manages to get on board a new ship of the navy that the Rangers happen to be taking on its maiden voyage tour of the solar system. The crystal takes over Zach's arm, and uses his lifeforce to power itself as it constructs a body out of servo droids. The Rangers have to stop it before it kills Zach.
43	"Round-Up"	James Luceno	November 6, 1986
An investigation leads to a Round Up.
44	"Aces and Apes"	Robert Mandell	November 7, 1986
The Rangers stop on Mesa to repair Space Tug 4, which was pulling a ship outfitted with an experimental Andorian engine that would render current drives obsolete. A space time distortion opens up, and through it comes a mysterious object, which hits the experimental vessel, and both crash on Mesa. The UFO turns out to be Scarecrow. He takes over a riverboat casino gambler, and teams up with Lazarus Slade. Slade is only interested in getting the new drive, while Scarecrow is after immortality.
45	"Badge of Power"	Robert Mandell	November 11, 1986
Lazarus Slade and Mogul combine their forces to create a badge that will duplicate all of the Rangers' unique gifts, stealing the data needed from the BETA computers.
46	"Boomtown"	Dan Fiorella	November 12, 1986
Prospector Old Roy McIntyre and Burr-O 5000 are on C-40, yet another planet in his never-ending search for the mother lode. Using his high-tech divining rod and his space-pick, he strikes it rich, uncovering a huge deposit of Starstones. But it is not long before word spans the galaxy and the "gold rush" is on. Beings from all over the universe come to the planet to stake a claim and get rich. The rush attracts the wrong element as well, like the Black Hole gang, who jump claims and rob the miners of their valuable Starstones. And Capt. Kidd and Squeege, sensing a chance to make a space-buck, naturally show up as well. He's selling blasters and weapons to the bandits who are running roughshod over the planet. This "boomtown", a rapidly grown city which sprang up around the mines is on the verge of being a lawless hell-hole. Which is why they request the Galaxy Rangers to come to town.
47	"Supertroopers"	Brian Daley	November 13, 1986
The rogue Supertroopers kidnap Senator Weiner and force him to steal Batch 22, a virus that can destroy all organic life on any planet. They want Gooseman, Dr. Negata and Commander Walsh to meet them at Wolf Den, their old Supertrooper training ground. Long flashback to when Captain Walsh ran the program, how Weiner messed it up and how Gooseman became the man he is today.
48	"Galaxy Stranger"	Tom De Haven	November 14, 1986
A blond, stubbled man in black appears in Frontier looking for Jacob Laramie, who has hired Stingray as muscle to push ranchers and farmers off their land to use as grazing land for his Bovo 9 cattle. Goose, the man with no name, confronts Stingray and Darkstar.
49	"Lord of the Sands"	Mick Farren	November 17, 1986
Zach, Goose and Zozo are stranded on a desert planet in the Empty Zone.
50	"Changeling"	Robert Mandell	November 25, 1986
The Deltoid Rock Prison colony in the Greater Asteroid Field has been taken over by the inmates. The General and his army are holding the command bridge but McCross is leading the Black Hole Gang in an attempt to control the station. The General fires the mighty engines and Deltoid is on the move, headed for a peaceful planet where escape vessels await. Commander Walsh decides to send a Ranger inside to take back control of the station. Q-Ball rigs the charging chamber to amplify Goose's Series Five implant giving Goose the ability to hold the disguise of an alien for three hours. Goose infiltrates the prison and makes his way to the command bridge that is held by the General. Time is running out as Goose must first get through the Black Hole Gang and prove himself against the other outlaws who have taken over the base.
51	"Promised Land"	Robert Mandell	November 19, 1986
Daisy O'Mega and Maya of Tarkon team up to buy weapons on Mesa to outfit the Tarkonian rebels. They eventually discover that someone is arming the natives, and it will turn into an all-out range war if the Rangers cannot stop them.
52	"Westride"	Lucia Robson	November 21, 1986
The planet Ozark is joining the League, and a land rush is organized for the territory for settlement. Daisy and the Black Hole gang are trying to rig the race. Also in the race are Annie Oh, Roy and Burro, and Cody "Wildfire" Carson, who have teamed up to try for the three best claims according to the survey map Roy managed to get hold of.
53	"Rainmaker"	Tom De Haven	November 24, 1986
An inventor creates a machine that can create rain.
54	"Battle of the Bandits"	James Luceno	November 26, 1986
Nimrod's back, this time as a Rock singer in a group called the Slaver Lords. But the Queen catches him, and gives him real Slavers for backup singers. She wants to snare all the humans attending the Battle of the Bands, an interstellar rock contest. Larry steals some of Mogul's henchman to form a band, and the Rangers go: moussed, blow dried, and teased within an inch of their lives.
55	"Rusty and the Boys"	Cy Voris	December 2, 1986
Q-ball's new android, Rusty, is quite a sight. Doc is sent to accompany her on her first mission on Basut. There Larry sees Rusty. Larry wants her, but due to a spell go wrong, she only has eyes for Doc. Rusty is eventually destroyed saving Doc's life. He repairs her, but her love is gone.
56	"Trouble at Texton"	Christopher Rowley	December 3, 1986
Dr. Albert Obgrabco is experimenting with particle collisions on Texton moon, trying to prove his theory on parallel universes. Sam the super accelerator computer tries to take over as Obgrabco is clearly nuts, and Obgrabco takes control of the project, introducing a virus to control Sam, who manages to get an SOS off to BETA first. The Rangers get sent, and Obgrabco tries to get rid of them by stranding them in the accelerator chamber. Goose gets trapped inside Sam, a whole is punched through to another universe, and Sam is merged with an extra-dimensional being.
57	"Horsepower"	Robert Mandell	November 27, 1986
Doc and Niko are drawn to a planet in the Empty Zone by a mysterious psychic force. The natives of the world believe Voyager to be a god called Hopi who will help them survive the radical weather changes. It turns out the Queen has a weather control device station on the planet.
58	"Ariel"	Brian Daley	December 2, 1986
Niko's mentor Ariel needs her help, back in Xanadu where Niko was raised as an orphan. The Megamind is loose, and takes Zach. When Niko and Ariel arrive, The Megamind puts them in a surreal landscape made up of Sphinxes and rabbit holes, and they must find their way to the center of the maze and the Megamind.
59	"Don Quixote Cody"	Henry Beck	November 28, 1986
Wildfire has "Don Quixote Syndrome" and thinks that he is Wyatt Earpp, Phis Morris and his gang are the Clanton brothers, Doc is Doc Holiday, and Niko is a dancehall girl named Louise. Meanwhile, Phis Morris wants Cody's bluefire generator, a shield that can disable any ship that tries to lock on tractors. Cody's ship is named the Buchanan, and the AI is Roberta (RB).
60	"Tortuna Rock"	Robert Mandell	December 4, 1986
Video queen, Eve Whiner, takes her crew to shoot a music video on the outlaw planet of Tortuna. Promising to make Geezi the Pedulont a video king, Geezi shows the humans the best locations inside Tortuna City. But trouble awaits as Brappo and his gang of alien outlaws kidnap Eve and her crew in an attempt to sell them to the Queen of The Crown. The Galaxy Rangers ride into town to rescue the trapped humans. While the Rangers shoot it out with the outlaws, Eve shoots the wildest music video this side of the galaxy.
61	"Fire and Iron"	James Luceno	December 5, 1986
Rancit and his gang are threatening farmers to stop the monorail going through. The Rangers are sent to help a woman whose husband was put in hospital. Doc is doing some espionage then gets tied to the monorail with dinky music playing in the background.
62	"Tower of Combat"	Mick Farren	December 8, 1986
The General, an alien warlord, is back. He has perfected a matter transportation device to collect an army of lifeforms to serve him. The General tests his device by stealing Doc, Zachery, Zozo and Waldo from the bridge of the BETA battle cruiser, The Laredo. The General sends his challenge to BETA. BETA must send two champions to a specific destination. There the champions will battle their way to the top of a tower. At each level of the tower the champions will face a tougher adversary. If they survive, The General's prisoners will be set free. If the BETA champions fail, they will serve The General in his army. Goose and Niko take up the challenge and arrive at the tower to face The General's most dangerous games.
63	"Gift of Life"	Robert Mandell	December 9, 1986
The Rangers investigate a mysterious call from the man who raised Goose.
64	"Sundancer"	Robert Mandell	December 10, 1986
Continuation from previous episode.
65	"Heartbeat"	Robert Mandell	December 11, 1986
Back on Tarkon, where the Tarkonians live under a strict belief that technology is ill-fated and its use forbidden among its people, Ranger Walter "Doc" Hartford is trying to convince King Spartos to heed his warnings. Doc has brought information stating that the Queen of the Crown is mounting an attack on Tarkon and that the only thing that can save them is to awaken "the Heart of Tarkon". With the Crown Armada approaching and the Scarecrow threatening to destroy the "Heart" for his own plans, Doc must rally with help from the daughter of King Spartos, Maya, to help an old Shaman bring life back to "the Heart of Tarkon".

== Theme songs ==
=== "No Guts, No Glory" ===
The theme song for the show, "No Guts, No Glory", was featured in the opening credits and preceded by a spoken introduction. The song was written and composed by Phil Galdston and John Van Tongeren, and performed by Van Tongeren using the stage name Johnny Vancouver. The song was also featured in the end credits for episodes 1-35 and episode 37.

=== "Rangers Ride Forever" ===
The song "Rangers Ride Forever" (commonly known as "Rangers Are Forever"), which featured as the end theme for episodes 36 and 38-65, was performed by the UK rock/AOR band FM, whose lead singer is Steve Overland. FM also performed the song "Showdown" (commonly referred to as "Out Beyond The Stars"), which was included as foreground music in several episodes. Both songs were written and composed by brothers Steve and Chris Overland.

== Home releases ==
Hasbro's Entertainment One currently owns the DVD distributions rights to Galaxy Rangers through Koch Vision (and 20th Century Fox Home Entertainment in several non-US countries). Four Galaxy Rangers DVDs, each containing four episodes, were released in the United States. Koch has released the entire series which consists of two box sets. The first set was released on May 13, 2008 and the second set was released on August 19, 2008.

KSM Film in Germany released the series on DVD in 5 episode volumes from May to November 2005, 25 episode volumes from April to August 2006, a complete set (65 episodes over 4 discs) in June 2008 with a Blu-ray (65 episodes on 1 disc) version released in November 2012. The Blu Ray version is presented in standard definition.

== Reception ==
The show has become a cult favorite and been considered innovative and ahead of its time. It has been praised for its unique sense of humor and well defined characters, without the trait of clichés to sell toys which was common among shows at that time.

== See also ==
- BraveStarr
- Princess Gwenevere and the Jewel Riders
- Saber Rider and the Star Sheriffs (heavily edited English version of Sei Jushi Bismarck)
