= Devin Stone =

American attorney and YouTuber (born 1980s)

- Born: Devin James Stone; 1983 or 1984 (age 41–42)
- Education: University of California, Los Angeles (BA, JD)
- Occupations: Lawyer; YouTuber

YouTube information
- Channel: LegalEagle
- Years active: 2017–present
- Subscribers: 3.96 million
- Views: 1.302 billion
- Last updated: November 15, 2026
- Website: stonelawdc.com

Devin James Stone (born 1983 or 1984) is an American lawyer and YouTuber known for his channel, LegalEagle, where he talks about current legal cases and explains how US law works in respect to them. He also reviews films and television shows on their accuracy depicting law and courtroom procedure as well as the legal issues raised by those works. He operates a law school exam prep company called Legal Eagle Prep as well as his own law firm called Eagle Team Law.

== Early life ==
Devin James Stone was born in 1983 or 1984. He graduated from the University of California, Los Angeles (UCLA) in 2005 with a Bachelor of Science degree in political science. He then attended the UCLA School of Law, graduating in 2008 with a Juris Doctor degree. As a law student, he was a member of the UCLA Entertainment Law Review and participated in the UCLA Mock Trial Program and the UCLA Moot Court Honors Program.

== Career ==
Stone was a judicial extern for senior United States Court of Appeals for the Ninth Circuit judge Arthur Lawrence Alarcón, and later worked as an associate at national firms Barnes & Thornburg and Akin Gump Strauss Hauer & Feld LLP.

In February 2020, Stone filed a series of Freedom of Information Act (FOIA) requests asking a federal judge to order the Trump administration to produce the information removed from former national security advisor John Bolton's book, The Room Where It Happened, and to reveal details concerning the underlying prepublication review process. The National Security Council (NSC) Records Access and Information Security Management Directorate (RAISMD) were named as the primary defendants in the action, along with the Central Intelligence Agency (CIA), National Archives and Records Administration, and Departments of Defense, Justice, and State. The suit was dismissed on March 18, 2021, with a judge ruling that the NSC is not an agency subject to FOIA and that the plaintiffs failed to demonstrate that the other agencies had to expedite their processing of the FOIA requests.

In September 2021, Stone became an adjunct law professor at Georgetown University Law Center.

On December 11, 2024, Stone announced that he was filing lawsuits against the Federal Bureau of Investigation and United States Department of Justice to try to obtain a court order requiring them to comply with his FOIA requests relating to the DOJ investigations on President-elect Donald Trump's classified documents case and election obstruction case.

On January 2, 2025, Stone announced that he and Sam Denby had filed a class action lawsuit against PayPal Honey for poaching creator commissions. This came after YouTube creator MegaLag created a video about the subject.

Stone guest starred in the Season 8 premiere of the comedy series Game Changer, released on May 18, 2026. During the episode, Stone, along with 2 other lawyers, assessed and judged the legality of the contestants jokes and actions.

== Awards and nominations ==
Year	Award	Category	Result	Ref.
2022	12th Streamy Awards	Commentary	Nominated	

== See also ==
- Legal education in the United States
- Mike Mandell (Law By Mike)
