= The War for Eternity =

- Cover of the 1983 Del Rey / Ballantine edition
- Author: Christopher Rowley
- Language: English
- Publication date: 1983

The War for Eternity is a 1983 novel written by Christopher Rowley.

== Plot summary ==
The War for Eternity is a novel in which the theme is interstellar war.

== Reception ==
Wendy Graham reviewed The War for Eternity for Adventurer magazine and stated that "I suppose that as a reviewer I should read everything that comes, on your behalf, but sometimes, dear reader, I can't be so noble. I couldn't get further than the first few pages of what the blurb calls 'A brilliant epic of interstellar war'. If I'm missing something wonderful perhaps someone would be kind enough to tell me, but, until then, no thanks."

== Reviews ==
- Review by C. J. Henderson [as by Chris Henderson] (1984) in Dragon Magazine, April 1984
- Review by Algis Budrys (1984) in The Magazine of Fantasy & Science Fiction, April 1984
- Review by Robert Coulson (1984) in Amazing Stories, July 1984
- Review by Thomas A. Easton [as by Tom Easton] (1984) in Analog Science Fiction/Science Fact, July 1984
- Review by Jerry L. Parsons (1984) in Fantasy Review, August 1984
- Review by Nik Morton (1987) in Paperback Inferno, #65
