= Avalon: Web of Magic =

Series of young adult fantasy novels by Robert Mandell

- Cover of Circles in the Stream (Seven Seas Entertainment edition)
- Circles in the Stream; All That Glitters; Cry of the Wolf; Secret of the Unicorn; Spellsinger; Trial by Fire; Song of the Unicorns; All's Fairy in Love and War; Ghost Wolf; Heart of Avalon; Dark Mage; Full Circle
- Author: Rachel Roberts; Robert Mandell
- Illustrator: Allison Strom
- Cover artist: Allison Strom (Seven Seas)
- Country: United States
- Language: English
- Genre: Young adult fantasy
- Publisher: Scholastic Corporation (first edition); Seven Seas Entertainment (second edition); Premier Digital Publishing (e-books)
- Published: 2001–2010

Avalon: Web of Magic (also printed as Avalon: Quest for Magic) is a series of twelve young adult fantasy books written by American author Rachel Roberts between 2001 and 2010. The books tell of the adventures of a trio of modern girls who are turned into mages to save the legendary land of Avalon from those who want to use its magic for evil. There is a related graphic novel series, Avalon: The Warlock Diaries, and an animated series adaptation is currently in the works.

== Synopsis ==
Emily Fletcher, Adriane Charday, and Kara Davies, three very different girls-turned-mages (highly skilled magic users), band together to protect and find Avalon, the very source of all magic. Each girl has a bonded animal and magic stone; their animal friends help them on their magical journeys through the different worlds along the Magic Web. The safety of the Magic Web, and the worlds it connects together, hangs on their success as they battle two main antagonists, the Dark Sorceress and the Spider Witch, who wish to harness the tremendous magical energy and magic of Avalon and distort the Magic Web for their own evil ends. The titular Web of Magic is a web on the magical, mystical plane of existence, connecting all worlds and planets with each other through mystical portals.

=== Circles in the Stream ===
Emily, Adriane, and Kara are all drawn to a secret place deep in the woods. It is much harder than it would be because Kara will not cooperate with the other two mages. There they discover a portal to another world through which strange and wondrous animals have emerged, searching desperately for the magic that will keep them alive. The animals are peaceful and good, but what follows them through the portal is pure evil. The girls have been chosen by magical beings called Fairimentals to protect the magical animals, though they do not know why. To save them and their world, the three girls must begin a quest to find the lost home of legendary magic, Avalon, or to perish trying.

=== All That Glitters ===
Emily and Adriane have one thing that Kara does not: a magical gem. But when Kara finally finds a magical stone of her own, a diamond unicorn horn (the unicorn jewel), it brings more trouble than anyone can handle. Pesky dragonflies start showing up everywhere and new Fairimentals warn of danger. While trying to use the mystical jewel to make her hair stop growing longer uncontrollably, her hair turns rainbow-colored. Worse, a band of terrifying monsters stalk Kara, and signs of an evil sorceress keep appearing before her. All these creatures come from another world and all want something from her. Finding out may take Kara, Emily, and Adriane a step closer to Avalon, the essential source of all magic. But it may also cost one of them her life.

=== Cry of the Wolf ===
Adriane and Stormbringer, the mistwolf, have quite a uniquely close and strong emotional bond of friendship. But is it strong enough to save them when Storm is lured through the portal to Aldenmor, another world much like Earth where magic still thrives? Adriane believes it is, and follows Storm to the magical world. There, Adriane faces the challenge of her life as she confronts Moonshadow, the pack leader and the entire mistwolf pack and tries to bring Storm home. The strange boy she meets, Zach, may be able to help her, but she will need Emily and Kara's magic to survive this battle.

=== The Secret of the Unicorn ===
Aldenmor's problems are worsening. Many new creatures are arriving in Ravenswood through the portal and they report that the Fairy Glen, home of the fairimentals, has vanished. A frightened and wounded unicorn is among the new refugees to Ravenswood. Can Emily communicate with her to offer help? The future of the Magic Web depends upon the dark secret the unicorn carries. All the while, a new terror of a harpy stalks Emily as she tries to find out about the injured creature.

=== Spellsinger ===
The first benefit concert for the Ravenswood Wildlife Preserve is on and everyone is depending on the event to ensure the Preserve's survival. Kara has booked hottie pop idol Johnny Conrad. But Conrad may be hiding a dangerous secret that threatens the animals, Ravenswood, and the girls themselves. This time, the magic is in the sound and music, and if Emily, Adriane, and Kara can not perform, their chance to find Avalon may be gone forever.

=== Trial by Fire ===
The road to Avalon is about to be revealed. The path is on the fairy map, a sparkling globe of wondrous magical power. Kara holds the fairy map in her hands, and must use it for the good of all worlds and all animals. But evil stalks Kara. The Dark Sorceress is after the map, too. If she finds Avalon first, people and animals from all worlds are doomed. The time has come for Emily, Adriane and Kara to be the healer, the warrior and the blazing star they were meant to be. They must win this battle – even if it means sacrificing the life of a dearly beloved friend.

=== Song of the Unicorns ===
Emily's dad wants her to vacation with him and his new wife—Emily's new step mom—at a horse ranch in New Mexico. Emily convinces her two friends to accompany her. But along the Magic Web, a dangerous magic tracker is hunting down unicorns, the one magical creature that can control the flow of magic. In the desert, the mages discover an entire herd of baby unicorns. Emily, Adriane, Kara, Ozzie, Dreamer, and Lyra must find a way to hide them and fight the dark hunter.

=== All's Fairy in Love and War ===
Kara cannot control her magical abilities. So she goes back to doing what she does best—being pretty and popular, and performing in the school play. The other mages, Emily and Adriane, have to continue without her. But the magic has other plans for Kara, the Blazing Star. Whisked into the Fairy Realms through a magic mirror, Kara falls smack into the middle of an impending war, and meets a mysterious boy with a dark secret. Kara may be the only one who can restore peace between the Fairies and the Goblins, but she must first tame her unstable powers, her wild heart, and a stallion made of pure fire. If she fails, it could mean the destruction of all of the Fairy Realms, the unraveling of the Magic Web... and even the end of Avalon itself.

=== Ghost Wolf ===
In this instalment, Adriane must defend Ravenswood, a magical animal sanctuary and her home, from an invasion by the Spider Witch and the Dark Sorceress. To prevent the antagonists from seizing the crystals of Avalon, Adriane must journey further into the mistwolf magic realm, confront the memory of a lost companion, and unlock more powerful abilities to save her home and allies.

=== The Heart of Avalon ===
A mysterious sickness threatens the sea dragons of Aldenmor. But Emily the healer can not find a cure unless she can bond with one special animal and advance to a Level Two mages like her friends. A strange, shape-shifting creature whisks her away and Emily meets perilous monsters, salty sea elves, and a hidden treasure holding the secrets to evolving her healing magic and finding the path to Avalon. To save the animals, Emily must face her deepest fears, and discover the truth about her enormously strong and powerful mage abilities... but she would not be alone.

=== The Dark Mage ===
In the very heart of the magic, darkness is growing. Time is running out and Emily, Kara, and Adriane must retrieve the last remaining power crystals to open the Gates of Avalon and save the Magic Web. No one told the girls the real secret of the Prophecy. Like their enemies, the Spider Witch and the Dark Sorceress, one mage is destined to bond and become one with dark magic. In their most dangerous adventure yet, each mage will be called upon to face her darkest fears. Their friendship is pushed to the limit; and one will become the Dark Mage.

=== Full Circle ===
Emily, Adriane, and Kara became mages, but failed to discover the secrets of Avalon and save their beloved animal friends. Now, the Gates of Avalon are locked, beloved friends are doomed, and the Dark Sorceress reigns supreme. There may be one final chance to fulfill their destiny. The mages must put everything they deeply and dearly love and care for on the line; and be prepared to sacrifice all as the final battle for Avalon begins.

== Publishing history ==
Cover of Trial by Fire (first edition)

The six Avalon: Web of Magic books were originally published by Scholastic Corporation. After the end of the Web of Magic series, the rights were obtained by CDS publishers, who reprinted the first six books, along with the first four volumes of the six-book Avalon: Quest for Magic sequel series.

1. Book 1 - Circles in the Stream; Scholastic (August 2001); Seven Seas (March 2008)
2. Book 2 - All That Glitters; Scholastic (October 2001); Seven Seas (March 2008)
3. Book 3 - Cry of the Wolf; Scholastic (December 2001); Seven Seas (May 2008)
4. Book 4 - Secret of the Unicorn; Scholastic (April 2002); Seven Seas (July 2008)
5. Book 5 - Spellsinger; Scholastic (July 2002); Seven Seas (September 2008)
6. Book 6 - Trial by Fire; Scholastic (October 2002); Seven Seas (November 2008)
7. Book 7 - Song of the Unicorns; CDS (2003); Seven Seas (January 2009)
8. Book 8 - All's Fairy in Love and War; CDS (2003); Seven Seas (March 2009)
9. Book 9 - Ghost Wolf; CDS (2004); Seven Seas (May 2009)
10. Book 10 - Heart of Avalon; CDS (2005); Seven Seas (September 2009)
11. Book 11 - Dark Mage; Seven Seas (October 2009)
12. Book 12 - Full Circle; Seven Seas (March 2010).

Out of print for three years, new editions of the books were published by Seven Seas Entertainment, with updated cover art by Allison Strom, revised text, the addition of in-book illustrations and an informational section. Seven Seas also released the last two volumes of the series, Dark Mage and Full Circle, never before published. The Quest for Magic subtitle is no longer used, with the second series books published under the original Web of Magic subtitle. By August 2012, Avalon books had sold more than 2 million copies overall.

The series was revised again for a collected edition Avalon: Web of Magic Omnibus with bonus content, starting with Omnibus 1 including the first three books and published in May 2012. It was also adapted for e-books on multiple eReader platforms by Premier Digital Publishing in 2012-2013. The first book, Circles in the Stream, was furthermore made available as a free audiobook, narrated by Mandy Moore. French edition by Bayard Jeunesse began publishing in 2017 as Les magiciennes d'Avalon, in translation by Maud Ortalda and with new illustrations by Julia Blattman.

A new trilogy entitled Avalon: Shadow Warrior was announced for release in 2012. In 2012, Avalon author Rachel Roberts delayed Shadow Warrior to 2016. It still has not been released yet as of 2021.

== Other media ==
=== Avalon: The Warlock Diaries ===
Seven Seas also released a three-book original English-language manga series, Avalon: The Warlock Diaries, written also by Rachel Roberts and drawn by Shiei (Aoi House, Amazing Agent Luna) and Edward Gan (The Outcast). Besides the manga storyline, each Warlock Diaries volume includes part of a short story, Legend of the LAOA, featuring secondary characters from the novels.

- Avalon: The Warlock Diaries Vol 1 (June 2009)
- Avalon: The Warlock Diaries Vol 2 (October 2009)
- Avalon: The Warlock Diaries Vol 3 (March 2010).

The books were also released in an omnibus edition in December 2010. A "super special manga edition" was planned to be published in 2014.

=== Music ===
The musical band Be*Tween's first single "Supernatural High" was released by Sony Music Entertainment in a cooperative marketing program with the Avalon books. The fictional version of the band is also featured in the series. "Supernatural High" and three more of Be*Tween's songs and the instrumental Avalon Orchestral Suite, are available for MP3 download on the Avalon: Web of Magic website.

=== Film and animated adaptation projects ===
In 2012, Mind's Eye Entertainment announced that they have partnered with Red Sky Entertainment and UK-based Moving Pictures Media to produce several live-action, feature-length film adaptations of Avalon: Web of Magic, to be written by Robert Mandell, directed by Donald Petrie and produced by Isabella Battiston. The first film was to be based on the first book in the series, Circles in the Stream, planned to be released in the summer of 2014.

In 2017, an animated series adaptation was announced in production with Robert Mandell's imprint Voyager.World by Minds Eye Entertainment and Bridgegate Pictures to be in the works, instead of the films. It was to be created by animation studios Animagrad and Futurikon, possibly using the Unreal Engine. In 2019, a change of studios was announced along with a sneak peek of new designs.

== See also ==
- Princess Gwenevere and the Jewel Riders, a 1990s animated series created, produced and directed by Mandell.
