= Mandle =

Mandle is a surname. Notable people with the surname include:

- Jon Mandle, American philosophy academic
- Roger Mandle (1941–2020), American historian, curator, and academic administrator

== See also ==
- Mandl
- Mandel
- Mandler
