= Munna Lal Mundel =

- Born: 7 July 1968 (age 58); Mundwa, Nagaur district, Rajasthan
- Military career
- Allegiance: India
- Branch: Indian Army
- Rank: Naik(corporal)
- Service number: 3181886
- Unit: 9th Jat Regiment
- Awards: Shaurya Chakra

Munna Lal Mundel (born 7 July 1968) is a retired Indian Army officer. He was a naik (corporal) in the 9th Jat Regiment of the Indian Army. He is recipient of the Shaurya Chakra award from then president, A. P. J. Abdul Kalam.

== Biography ==
Munna Lal Mundel was born on 7 July 1968, in the village of Mundwa, located in the Nagaur district of Rajasthan. Mundel enlisted in the Indian Army and served as a naik (corporal) in the 9th Jat Regiment. His service number was 3181886. On 11 August 2003, during a patrol in the Naushera sector of Jammu and Kashmir, four Indian soldiers were ambushed and killed by Pakistani forces. In retaliation, a month later, on 18 September 2003, Mundel led a team of 12 soldiers from the Jat Regiment in a counter-attack on the Pakistani post. Despite being hit by 30 bullets from an AK-47, which severely injured his legs, Mundel continued to fight. His team managed to kill 16 Pakistani soldiers, and Mundel personally beheaded several of them. Mundel for his bravery was awarded the Shaurya Chakra, by President A. P. J. Abdul Kalam on 15 August 2004.
