= Mandel Photo Postcard Machine =

Photo postcard-producing camera and developer machine

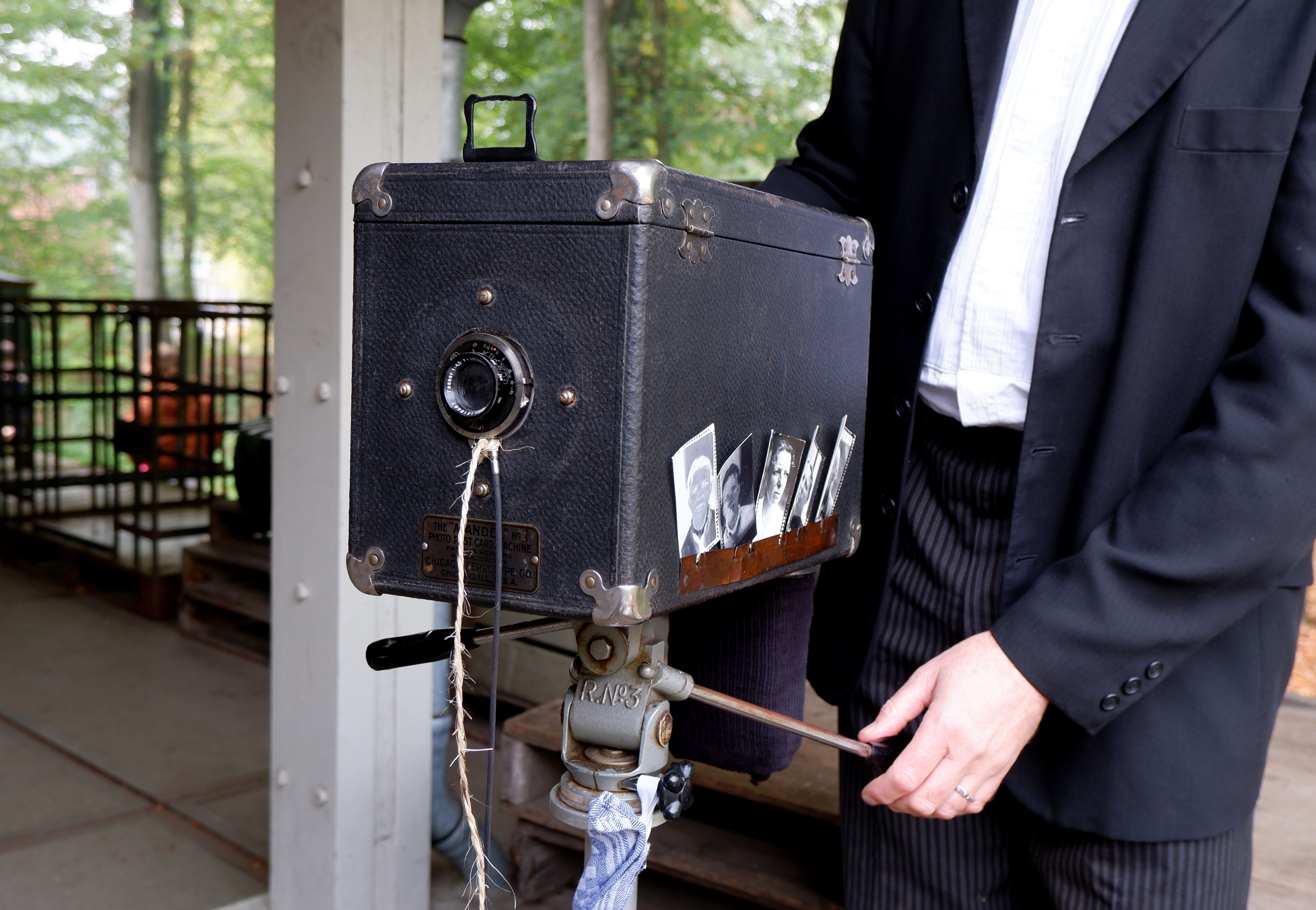
Mandel Photo Postcard Machine at the Arnhem open-air museum, the Netherlands

The Mandel No. 1 Photo Postcard Machine was a photo camera built in the years 1911 to 1930 by the Chicago Ferrotype Company. Like cameras from some other brands in that time, the camera produced a small photograph in waiting time. The photograph could be used as a real photo postcard and sent by mail, hence the name.

The machine was sold to amateurs and professionals alike. For a professional it was possible, after some learning, to provide customers in the street with a picture of themselves in a couple of minutes. The photo card was developed right in the machine.
