= Peter Mandl =

Swedish sculptor

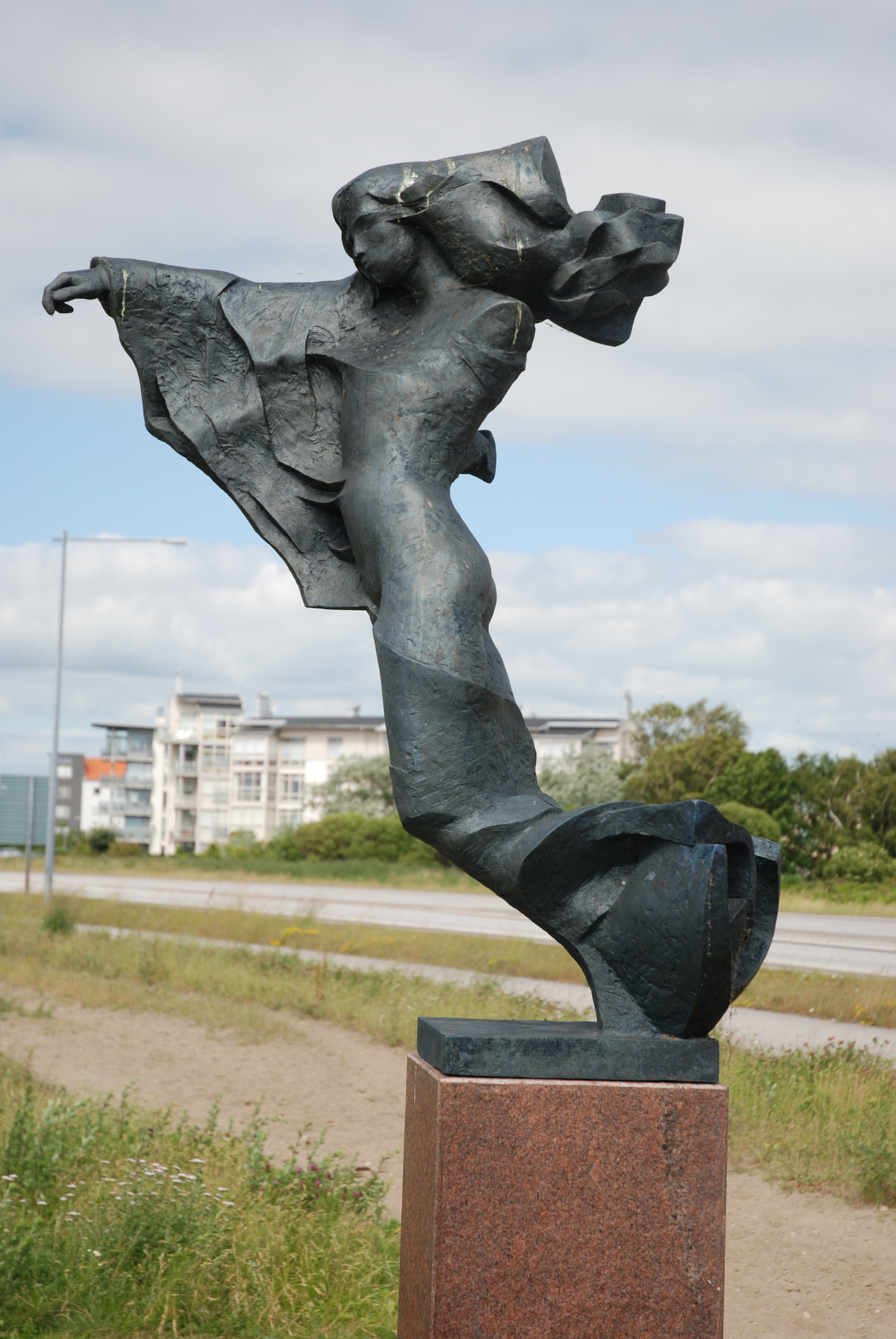
Kassandra, one of Mandl's sculptures, located in Höllviken.

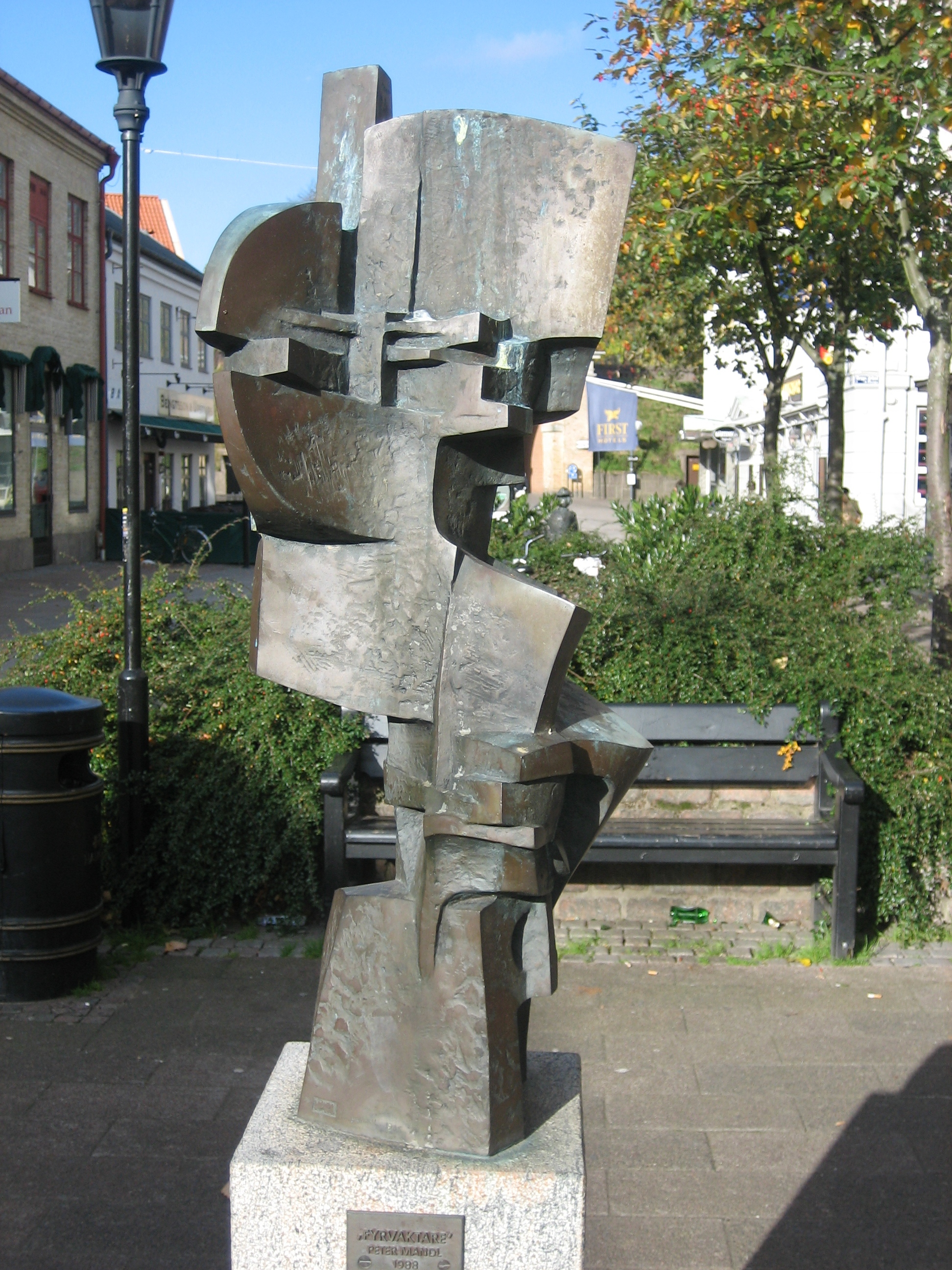
Sculpture Fyrvaktare in Halmstad.

Peter Mandl is a Swedish sculptor. He was born in 1947 in Prague in the then Czechoslovakia.

When the Soviet Union invaded Prague in 1968, Peter and his family fled to Sweden. Peter now resides with his wife Gunilla in Påarp in the outskirts of Halmstad. Together, they have two children: a son, Paul (born in 1975), and a daughter, Ingela (born in 1976). Today, Ingela handles the business side of Peter’s work, allowing him to focus fully on his creative process.

Much of Peter's art is on general viewing around Sweden. His beautiful women crafted in bronze and glass shapes that are reminiscent of the sea and wind can be seen in many galleries.

At the end of the 70's Peter worked exclusively with bronze but returned to glass at the beginning of the 90's. Today he works both with glass and bronze.
