= Edgar Mandel =

German actor

- Born: 19 August 1928 (age 98)
- Occupation: Actor
- Organizations: Theater Dortmund

Edgar Mandel (born 19 August 1928) is a German stage, film, and television actor who also appeared in audio plays.

== Career ==
He took part in the 1957 world premiere of Bertold Brecht's Die Gesichte der Simone Machard at the Theater Frankfurt, staged by Harry Buckwitz. He was a member of the Theater Dortmund.

== Personal life ==
He was born in Speyer.

== Filmography ==
Films with Mandel have included:

- Like a Tear in the Ocean (1970, TV miniseries)
- Revolution in Frankfurt (1979)
