= Law By Mike =

American attorney and internet personality

- Born: Michael Laurence Mandell
- Education: University of Southern California (BA); Duke University (JD)
- Occupations: Attorney; content creator; author

TikTok information
- Page: Law By Mike
- Years active: 2020–present
- Genre: Law
- Followers: 11.6 million

YouTube information
- Channel: Law By Mike
- Years active: 2020–present
- Genre: Law
- Subscribers: 19.6 million
- Views: 19.6 billion
- Last updated: September 3, 2026
- Website: www.lawbymike.com

Michael Laurence Mandell, known online as Law By Mike, is an American attorney and internet personality based in Los Angeles, California. He produces legal education videos on TikTok, YouTube, and Instagram and operates law firm, Mandell Law APC. In 2025, Law by Mike was listed as one of the top YouTube creators of the year. He publishes videos originally in English, of which a Spanish dubbed version is offered on independent channels.

== Early life and education ==
Mandell studied communications at the University of Southern California, graduating from the USC Annenberg School for Communication and Journalism in 2009. He has described coming from a family of personal injury lawyers.

He then earned a Juris Doctor from Duke University School of Law in 2012. He was admitted to the State Bar of California in 2012, and as of 2026 his license has remained active.

== Legal career ==
After graduating from Duke Law, Mandell worked as an associate attorney at Reed Smith, an international law firm, at its Los Angeles office for approximately eight years, focusing on product liability litigation. He has stated that the firm's policies restricted attorneys from engaging in personal marketing or social media activity during this period.

In 2020, Mandell left Reed Smith and founded Mandell Law APC, based in Woodland Hills. The firm handles cases in personal injury, criminal defense, entertainment law, and sexual abuse. Prior to founding Mandell Law, Mandell was recognized on the Daily Journals list of "Top Verdicts in California" for a 2014 case, Gisvold v. Merck.

== Online career ==
Mandell started his YouTube channel, and also posted his first TikTok video on November 17, 2020. He has said he began posting as a low cost way to attract clients to his newly founded firm. His first public YouTube video, which discusses what to do if pulled over for speeding, appeared on February 26, 2021.

Early videos attracted limited attention, but a clip about what to say during a police traffic stop went viral, accumulating tens of millions of views. By October 2021, one year after creating his YouTube channel, Mandell had surpassed 100,000 subscribers.

Mandell's videos cover legal situations relevant to everyday life, including police encounters, landlord tenant disputes and workplace rights. He has stated that his content shifted over time from a purely business oriented goal toward legal education more broadly: "I went from a lawyer mentality to an educator mentality."

Mandell also hosts Law by Mike on the Mic, a podcast featuring interviews with legal professionals, public figures, and others whose lives have intersected with legal matters. The show is described as aimed at general audiences rather than legal professionals.

== Book ==
In 2026, Mandell published Oops... That's Illegal!: A Handbook for the Wildly Curious (and the Accidental Outlaw) through Balance, an imprint of Hachette Book Group. The book addresses unusual and everyday legal questions in a format consistent with his video content, covering topics such as police interactions, tenant rights, and civil disputes.

== Bibliography ==
Year	Title	Publisher
2026	Oops... That's Illegal!: A Handbook for the Wildly Curious (and the Accidental Outlaw)	Balance / Hachette Book Group

== See also ==
- List of YouTubers
- Legal education in the United States
- Devin Stone (LegalEagle)
