= Mandel =

Mandel is a surname (and occasional given name) that occurs in multiple cultures and languages. It is a Dutch, German and Jewish surname, meaning "almond", from the Middle High German and Middle Dutch mandel. Mandel can be a locational surname, from places called Mandel, such as Mandel, Germany. Mandel may also be a Dutch surname, from the Middle Dutch mandele, meaning a number of sheaves of harvested wheat.

== Notable people ==
- Alon Mandel (born 1988), Israeli swimmer
- Babaloo Mandel (born 1949), American screenwriter
- David Mandel (born 1970), American television producer and writer
- Edgar Mandel (born 1928), German actor
- Eli Mandel (1922–1992), Canadian writer
- Emily St. John Mandel (born 1979), Canadian novelist
- Emmanuil Mandel (1925–2018), Russian poet
- Ernest Mandel (1923–1995), Belgian politician, professor and writer
- Frank Mandel, American playwright and producer
- Georges Mandel (1885–1944), French politician
- Harvey Mandel (born 1945), American guitarist
- Howie Mandel (born 1955), Canadian actor and comedian
- Jan Mandel (born 1956), American mathematician
- Jean Mandel (1911–1974), German footballer and politician
- Jeanne Dorsey Mandel (1937–2001), American public official from Maryland
- Jennifer R. Mandel, American biologist
- Johnny Mandel (1925–2020), American musician
- Josh Mandel (born 1977), American politician
- Julius Mandel (1899–1969), Hungarian football player and manager
- Leonard Mandel (1927–2001), American physicist
- Loring Mandel (1928–2020), American playwright
- Maria Mandel (1912–1948), Austrian Nazi official
- Marvin Mandel (1920–2015), American politician
- Mati Mandel (born 1945), Estonian archaeologist and historian
- Morton Mandel (1921–2019), American businessman
- Robert Mandel (born 1945), American film producer
- Robert Mandel (born 1957), Hungarian musician and organologist
- Rolfe D. Mandel (born 1952), American archaeologist
- Sammy Mandel (1904–1967), American boxer
- Semyon Mandel (1907–1974), Russian theatre and film designer
- Seth Mandel (born 1982), American writer and editor
- Stephen Mandel (born 1945), Canadian politician
- Stephen Mandel (hedge fund manager) (born 1956), American businessman
- Steven L. Mandel, American anesthesiologist
- Stewart Mandel (born 1976), American sportswriter
- Suzy Mandel (born 1953), British actress
- Tom Mandel (futurist) (1946–1995), American futurist
- Tom Mandel (poet) (born 1942), American poet
- William Mandel (1917–2016), American journalist

== See also ==
- Mandell, surname
- Mandl, surname
- Mandle, surname
- Mandal (surname)
- Mendel (disambiguation)
- Mendelsohn
- Mendelssohn
- Menachem Mendel
