= Robert Mandell (film producer) =

American film producer

- Occupations: Film director, producer, screenwriter

Robert Mandell is an American animated series and film writer, director and producer. Mandell headed New Frontier Productions/New Frontier Entertainment and Red Sky Entertainment. He is now the head of the company Voyager.

Robert Mandell is best known as the creator, producer and co-writer of the 1986–1987 animated series The Adventures of the Galaxy Rangers (the "Collection1" edition of Galaxy Rangers features a 14-minute video interview with Mandell about his career as well as an audio commentary track). Later he created the 1995–1996 animated series Princess Gwenevere and the Jewel Riders and wrote or co-wrote and directed its episodes. He was also a writer and executive producer for the American version of Thunderbirds 2086 (in association with Barry Gray) and an executive producer for The King and I and the Ace Ventura, Pet Detective animated TV series, among other credits.

As of 2011, Mandell has been the Chief Creative Officer and CEO of the company Red Sky Entertainment (a subsidiary of Blue Wave Entertainment), whose properties include Galaxy Rangers, Heavy Metal Pulp (a series of illustrated novels published by Tor in cooperation with Heavy Metal magazine) and the Avalon: Web of Magic novel series. Voyager projects have included producing a TV series based on Larry Niven's novel Ringworld, as well as a two-volume manga adaptation based on Ringworld, a film adaptation of the Avalon book series, and a re-imagined live action TV series based on the Galaxy Rangers.
