= Mindell =

Mindell is a surname. Notable people with the surname include:

- Arnold Mindell (1940–2024), American psychotherapist
- Earl Mindell (born 1940), Canadian author and nutritionist
- Fania Mindell (1894–1969), American feminist, activist and theater artist

== See also ==
- Mindel
