= Mundell =

Mundell is a surname. Notable people with the surname include:

- David Mundell (born 1962), politician
- Ed Mundell, guitarist
- Hugh Mundell (1962–1983), singer
- James Mundell (died 1762), educator
- Marc Mundell (born 1983), race walker
- Oliver Mundell (born 1989), politician
- Robert Mundell (1932–2021), economist
- Tom Mundell, better known as Metrik, electronic music producer
- William D. Mundell (1912–1997), poet
- William Mundell, politician
- William Richard Mundell, military officer

== See also ==
- Mundell Lowe (1922–2017), jazz musician
- Mundell Music, concert promoter
