= Franz Mandl (physicist) =

British theoretical physicist

- Born: 1923; Vienna, Austria
- Died: 2009 (aged 85)
- Occupation: Theoretical physicist

Academic background
- Education: University of Oxford
- Thesis: Limiting principles in statistical mechanics (1949)

Franz Mandl (1923–2009) was a British theoretical physicist, known for his graduate-level textbooks.

== Early life and education ==
Mandl was born in Vienna in 1923 into a Jewish family. They moved to Berlin in the 1920s, and after the rise of Nazi Germany, the family emigrated to England as refugees in 1936. Mandl received a scholarship to study at Lincoln College, Oxford where he received his undergraduate and doctorate degrees in physics.

== Academic career ==
After receiving his doctorate, Mandl spent a few years in the US, before returning to the UK to become a reader of physics at the University of Manchester. He spent his career there collaborating in atomic research and writing textbooks. His books were considered influential to the graduate study of theoretical physics.

== Personal life and death ==
Mandl married Betty Clifford, a mathematician whom he met while studying at Oxford.

He died in 2009 at the age of 85.

== Works ==
=== Books ===
- Mandl, Franz (1954). Quantum Mechanics (1st ed.). Butterworths Scientific Publications. OCLC 1088018527. Mandl, Franz (6 June 2013). 2013 pbk edition. John Wiley & Sons. ISBN 978-0-471-93155-3.
- Mandl, Franz (1959). Introduction to Quantum Field Theory (1st ed.). Interscience Publishers. OCLC 422500484.
- Mandl, Franz (1971). Statistical Physics. Manchester Physics Series (1st ed.). John Wiley & Sons. OCLC 911305958. Mandl, Franz (8 January 1991). pbk reprint of 1988 2nd edition. John Wiley & Sons. ISBN 978-0-471-91533-1.
- Mandl, Franz; Shaw, Graham (1984). Quantum Field Theory (1st ed.). John Wiley & Sons. OCLC 802732334. Mandl, Franz; Shaw, Graham (6 June 2013). pbk 2nd edition. John Wiley & Sons. ISBN 978-0-471-49684-7.

=== Technical reports and lectures ===
- Mandl, Franz (1952). The ionization by electron impact of excited hydrogen atoms. Harwell, UK: Atomic Energy Research Establishment. OCLC 28036431.
- Mandl, Franz (1956). Note on the phase-shifts for pion-nucleon scattering at 40 Mev. University of Rochester, Department of Physics. OCLC 1029842342.
- Mandl, Franz (1960). Symmetry properties of particles and fields (PDF). CERN Lectures. Geneva: CERN. OCLC 11103193.
