= Amanda =

- Pronunciation: /əˈmændə/ ə-MAN-də
- Gender: Female

Origin
- Language: Latin
- Meaning: "she who must (or is fit to) be loved"; "beautiful"; "deserving to be loved"; "beloved".

Other names
- See also: Amandine; Amy; Mandy; Manda

Amanda is a Latin feminine gerundive (i.e. verbal adjective) name meaning "she who must (or is fit to) be loved". It is common in countries where Germanic and Romance languages are spoken. Other translations, with similar meaning, could be "deserving to be loved," "worthy of love," or "loved very much by everyone." Diminutive forms include Mandy and Manda, among others. Amy is also an English diminutive of Amanda as well as other (unrelated) given names.

Amanda comes from ama- (the stem of the Latin verb amare, "to love") plus the feminine nominative singular gerundive ending (-nda). Other names, especially female names, were derived from this verb form, such as Miranda.

The name occasionally appears in late antiquity, such as the Amanda who was the "wife of the ex-advocate and ex-provincial governor Aper (q.v.); she cared for his estates and raised their children after he adopted the monastic life: 'curat illa saeculi curas, ne tu cures'" (Paul. Nol. Epist. 44.4).

In England the name Amanda first appeared in 1212 on a birth record from Warwickshire, England, and five centuries later the name was popularized by poets and playwrights. In the United States, Amanda slowly became more prominent from the 1930s to the 1960s, ranking among the top 200 baby names.

From 1976 to 1995, Amanda ranked in the ten most popular female baby names in the United States. The name was most popular from 1978 to 1992, when it ranked in the top four. At its peak, in 1980, it was the second most popular. In 2009, Amanda ranked number 166. It was ranked among the top ten names given to girls born in Puerto Rico in 2009. The name has also recently been popular in Sweden, where it ranked twentieth for girls born in 2009, down five places from 2008. It is also popular in Swedish-speaking families in Finland, where it ranked among the top ten names for girls born to this demographic group.

In Nigeria, the name Amanda is a name among the Igbo people combined with Igbo elements to form such names as Chimamanda (meaning "my God will not fail"), which was created by the writer Chimamanda Ngozi Adichie

== People ==
=== A ===
- Amanda Aasa (born 1996), Swedish singer and songwriter
- Amanda Abizaid, American Lebanese actress, model, singer, and songwriter
- Amanda Abbington (born 1974), English actress
- Amanda Adams (born 1976), American archaeologist and author
- Amanda Aday (born 1981), American actress
- Amanda L. Aikens (1833–1892), American editor and philanthropist
- Amanda Aizpuriete (1956–2023), Latvian poet and translator
- Amanda Alcantara, Dominican–American activist and writer
- Amanda Aldridge (1866–1956), English opera singer and teacher
- Amanda Alfaro (born 2001), Costa Rican swimmer
- Amanda Allen (born 2005), Canadian soccer player
- Amanda Ammar (born 1986), Canadian skier
- Amanda Anderson, American professor
- Amanda Andradóttir (born 2003), Icelandic soccer player
- Amanda Anisimova (born 2001), Russian–American tennis player
- Amanda Ansell (born 1976), English artist
- Amanda Araújo (born 1990), Brazilian rugby union player
- Amanda Asay (1988–2022), Canadian baseball and ice hockey player
- Amanda Auchter (born 1977), American professor and writer
- Amanda Austin (1859–1917), American painter and sculptor
- Amanda Ayala (born 1997), American musician, singer, and songwriter

=== B ===
- Amanda Baker (born 1979), American actress
- Amanda Balionis (born 1985), American sports journalist
- Amanda Balen (born 1984), Canadian dancer
- Amanda Balon (born 1997), American actress and dancer
- Amanda Banton (born 1970), Australian lawyer
- Amanda Barker, Canadian actress
- Amanda Barnard (born 1971), Australian theoretical physicist
- Amanda Barr (born 1982), English soccer player
- Amanda Barrie (born 1935), English actress
- Amanda Barusch, New Zealand academic
- Amanda Basica (born 1978), American tennis player
- Amanda Bateman (born 1996), Australian rower
- Amanda Batten (born 1979), American politician
- Amanda Bauer (born 1979), American astronomer and science communicator
- Amanda Bayer, American economist
- Amanda Beard (born 1981), American swimmer
- Amanda Bearse (born 1958), American actress, comedian, and director
- Amanda Bell (born 1988), American mixed martial artist
- Amanda Bennett (born 1952), American author and journalist
- Amanda Berenguer (1921–2010), Uruguayan poet
- Amanda Bergman, Swedish musician, singer, and songwriter
- Amanda Berman, civil rights attorney; founder and executive director of Zioness
- Amanda Billing (born 1976), New Zealand actress
- Amanda Billings (born 1986), Canadian figure skater
- Amanda Bingson (born 1990), American track and field athlete
- Amanda Bishop (born 1979), Australian actress and comedian
- Amanda Black (born 1993), South African singer and songwriter
- Amanda Blackhorse (born 1982), Native American social worker
- Amanda Blain (born 1980), Canadian internet personality and web developer
- Amanda Blair (born 1968), Australian radio broadcaster
- Amanda Blake (1929–1989), American actress
- Amanda Blanc (born 1967), Welsh businesswoman
- Amanda Blank (born 1983), American rapper
- Amanda Bloor (born 1962), English Anglican priest
- Amanda Blumenherst (born 1986), American golfer
- Amanda Borden (born 1977), American artistic gymnast
- Amanda Bosch (born 2008), Mexican rhythmic gymnast
- Amanda Bosh, American observational astronomer and planetary scientist
- Amanda Bouldin (born 1984), American politician
- Amanda Boulier (born 1993), American ice hockey player
- Amanda Boxer (born 1948), English actress
- Amanda Boyden, American novelist
- Amanda Bradford, American marine mammal biologist
- Amanda Brailsford, American judge
- Amanda Bresnan (born 1971), Australian politician
- Amanda Broderick (born 1971), English academic and administrator
- Amanda Brooks (born 1981), American actress
- Amanda Brotchie (died 2025), Australian director and writer
- Amanda Browder (born 1976), American installation artist
- Amanda Brugel (born 1978), Canadian actress
- Amanda Brundage (born 1991), American mixed martial artist
- Amanda Brunker (born 1974), Irish journalist, model, and novelist
- Amanda Budden (born 1994), Irish soccer player
- Amanda Burden (born 1944), American urban planner
- Amanda Burk, Canadian artist and professor
- Amanda Burrows, Canadian politician
- Amanda Burton (born 1956), Northern Irish actress
- Amanda Busick (born 1986), American sports reporter
- Amanda Junquera Butler (1898–1986), Spanish writer
- Amanda Butler (born 1972), American basketball coach and player
- Amanda Bynes (born 1986), American actress
- Amanda Byram (born 1973), Irish television presenter

=== C ===
- Amanda Cajander (1827–1871), Finnish deaconess
- Amanda Cappelletti (born 1986), American lawyer and politician
- Amanda Carpenter (born 1982), American author and political commentator
- Amanda Mildred Carr (born 1990), Thai BMX cyclist
- Amanda Carter (born 1964), Australian wheelchair basketball player
- Amanda Cassatt (born 1991), American entrepreneur and journalist
- Amanda Castro (1962–2010), Honduran poet
- Amanda Cerny (born 1991), American internet personality and model
- Amanda Chase (born 1969), American politician
- Amanda Chetwynd, British mathematician and statistician
- Amanda Chidester (born 1990), American softball player
- Amanda Chudoba (born 1990), Canadian trap shooter
- Amanda Cinalli (born 1986), American soccer player
- Amanda Clapham (born 1990), English actress
- Amanda Clayton (born 1981), American actress
- Amanda Clement (1888–1971), American baseball umpire
- Amanda Coetzer (born 1971), South African tennis player
- Amanda Coker (born 1992), American cyclist
- Amanda Collamore, American politician
- Amanda Coneo (born 1996), Colombian volleyball player
- Amanda Congdon (born 1981), American video blogger
- Amanda Conner, American comics artist
- Amanda Conway (born 1997), American ice hockey player
- Amanda Coogan (born 1971), Irish performance artist
- Amanda Lindsey Cook (born 1984), Canadian Christian musician
- Amanda Cooper (born 1991), American mixed martial artist
- Amanda Jane Cooper (born 1988), American actress
- Amanda Coplin, American novelist
- Amanda Cottreau, Canadian singer and songwriter
- Amanda Coulson (born 1982), English amateur boxer and boxing coach
- Amanda Crew (born 1986), Canadian actress
- Amanda Cromwell (born 1970), American soccer coach and player
- Amanda Curtis (born 1979), American politician

=== D ===
- Amanda DaCosta (born 1989), American–born Portuguese soccer player
- Amanda Davies (born 1980), English sports journalist
- Amanda Dehnert, American regional theater director
- Amanda Demme, American photographer
- Amanda Teixeira Dias (born 1995), Brazilian politician
- Amanda Dobbs (born 1993), American figure skater
- Amanda Doherty (born 1997), American golfer
- Amanda Doman (born 1977), Australian softball player
- Amanda Donohoe (born 1962), English actress
- Amanda Dorn, Australian politician
- Amanda Douge (born 1976), Australian actress
- Amanda Minnie Douglas (1831–1916), American writer
- Amanda Dowe (born 1991), American basketball player
- Amanda Downum (born 1979), American author
- Amanda Drew (born 1969), English actress
- Amanda Drury (born 1973), Australian journalist and news anchor
- Amanda Dudamel (born 1999), Venezuelan beauty queen, fashion designer, model, and philanthropist
- Amanda Ruter Dufour (1822–1899), American poet
- Amanda Dunbar (born 1982), American painter
- Amanda Duthie, Scottish–born Australian festival director

=== E ===
- Amanda Ebeye (born 1986), Nigerian actress and model
- Amanda Eccleston (born 1990), American middle-distance runner
- Amanda Edgren (born 1993), Swedish soccer player
- Amanda Edwards, American attorney and politician
- Amanda Eliasch (born 1960), English artist, photographer and poet
- Amanda Elwes (born 1964), English actress
- Amanda Evora (born 1984), American figure skater

=== F ===
- Amanda Farías (born 1989), American politician
- Amanda Farrugia (born 1985), Australian rules footballer
- Amanda Favier (born 1979), French violinist
- Amanda Fazio (born 1954), Australian politician
- Amanda Ferguson (born 1967), English fencer
- Amanda Figueras (born 1978), Spanish journalist
- Amanda Filipacchi (born 1967), French–American novelist
- Amanda Fink (born 1986), American tennis player
- Amanda Fisher, English cell biologist
- Amanda Folsom (born 1979), American mathematician
- Amanda Fondell (born 1994), Swedish singer
- Amanda Fortier (born 1978), Canadian skier
- Amanda Fosang, Australian biomedical researcher
- Amanda Freitag (born 1972), American author and chef
- Amanda Fuller (born 1984), American actress

=== G ===
- Amanda Gailey (born 1976), American academic and political activist
- Amanda Galle (born 1989), Canadian professional boxer
- Amanda Garner (born 1985), Australian ballroom dancer
- Amanda Gates (born 1986), Canadian curler
- Amanda Gefter (born 1980), American writer
- Amanda Ghost (born 1974), English music executive, singer and songwriter
- Amanda Glover (born 1970), English beach volleyball player
- Amanda González (born 1979), Spanish field hockey player
- Amanda Goodman, American actress and voice artist
- Amanda Gorman (born 1998), American activist and poet
- Amanda Grace, American singer and songwriter
- Amanda Grahame (born 1979), Australian tennis player
- Amanda Griffin (born 1979), Filipino–English model and television presenter
- Amanda Grosserode (born 1975), American politician
- Amanda Grunfeld (born 1967), English tennis player
- Amanda Gutierres (born 2001), Brazilian soccer player

=== H ===
- Amanda Hale (born 1982), British actress
- Amanda K. Hale, Canadian writer
- Amanda Hamilton (born 1974), Scottish broadcaster, businesswoman and nutritionist
- Amanda Hardy (born 1971), Australian badminton player
- Amanda Harkimo (born 1990), Finnish disk jockey
- Amanda Harlech (born 1958), English creative consultant and writer
- Amanda Bartlett Harris (1824–1917), American author and literary critic
- Amanda Harris (born 1963), Australian–born English actress
- Amanda Harrison (born 1974), Australian actress and singer
- Amanda Havard (born 1986), American writer
- Amanda Hearst (born 1984), American fashion model and socialite
- Amanda Hemmingsen-Jaeger, American politician
- Amanda Hendrick (born 1990), Scottish model
- Amanda Hendrix (born 1968), American planetary scientist
- Amanda Heng (born 1951), Singaporean artist and curator
- Amanda Herbert (born 1943), British cytopathologist and histopathologist
- Amanda Hess, American journalist
- Amanda Hesser (born 1972), American author and writer
- Amanda Hickey (1838–1894), American surgeon
- Amanda Hillwood (born 1957), English actress
- Amanda Hocking (born 1984), American writer
- Amanda Hodgkinson (born 1965), English novelist
- Amanda Holden (born 1971), English actress and singer
- Amanda Holiday (born 1964), Sierra Leonean–English artist and poet
- Amanda Hollis-Brusky, American scholar
- Amanda Hopmans (born 1976), Dutch tennis player
- Amanda Houston (born 1980), English weather presenter
- Amanda Howard (born 1973), Australian author and writer
- Amanda Howe, British doctor
- Amanda Husberg (1940–2021), American composer

=== I ===
- Amanda Ilestedt (born 1993), Swedish soccer player

=== J ===
- Amanda Jackson (born 1985), Armenian–American basketball player
- Amanda James (born 1960), British swimmer
- Amanda Jamieson (born 1997), New Zealand racing cyclist
- Amanda Jansson (born 1990), Swedish actress
- Amanda Jelks (born 1986), American actress
- Amanda Jenssen (born 1988), Swedish singer and songwriter
- Amanda Jetter (born 1994), American artistic gymnast
- Amanda Johnston (born 1977), American poet
- Amanda Joy, Canadian actress, comedian, producer and writer

=== K ===
- Amanda Keen (born 1978), English tennis player
- Amanda Keller (born 1962), Australian actress, comedian, journalist, radio and television personality
- Amanda Kelly (born 1982), Scottish kickboxer and mixed martial artist
- Amanda Kerfstedt (1835–1920), Swedish novelist and playwright
- Amanda Kernell (born 1986), Swedish director and screenwriter
- Amanda Kessel (born 1991), American ice hockey player
- Amanda Kloots (born 1982), American actress, dancer and fitness instructor
- Amanda Knox (born 1987), American woman exonerated in Italy for the murder of Meredith Kercher
- Amanda Kolczynski (born 1993), French handballer
- Amanda Kotaja (born 1995), Finnish Paralympic athlete
- Amanda Kotze (born 1986), South African sprinter
- Amanda Kozak (born 1984), American beauty queen
- Amanda Kramer (born 1961), American composer and touring musician
- Amanda Kurtović (born 1991), Norwegian handballer

=== L ===
- Amanda Labarca (1886–1975), Chilean diplomat, educator and writer
- Amanda Laine (born 1992), Canadian model
- Amanda Lamb (born 1972), English model, property expert and television presenter
- Amanda Lang (born 1970), Canadian business journalist
- Amanda Langlet (born 1967), French actress
- Amanda Lassiter (born 1979), American basketball player
- Amanda Lathlin (born 1976), Canadian politician
- Amanda Lawrence (born 1971), English actress
- Amanda Lear (born 1939), French actress, model, painter, singer, songwriter and television presenter
- Amanda Leduc, Canadian writer
- Amanda Leighton (born 1993), American actress
- Amanda Lemos (born 1987), Brazilian mixed martial artist
- Amanda Lepore, American model, performance artist and singer
- Amanda Leveille (born 1994), Canadian ice hockey player
- Amanda Levens (born 1979), American basketball coach
- Amanda Lightfoot (born 1987), English biathlete
- Amanda Lim (born 1993), Singaporean freestyle swimmer
- Amanda Lind (born 1980), Swedish politician
- Amanda Lindblad (born 1991), Swedish politician
- Amanda Lindhout (born 1981), Canadian humanitarian, journalist and public speaker
- Amanda Linnér (born 2001), Swedish golfer
- Amanda Lipitz (born 1980), American director
- Amanda Locke (born 1989), American softball player
- Amanda Lohrey (born 1947), Australian novelist and writer
- Amanda Lorenz (born 1997), American softball player
- Amanda Lovelace (born 1991), American poet

=== M ===
- Amanda Mabro, Canadian singer, songwriter, and vocal coach
- Amanda Macias, American journalist
- Amanda MacLean, Scottish singer and writer
- Amanda Magadan (born 1995), American field hockey player
- Amanda Magalhães (born 1991), Brazilian actress, pianist, singer, and songwriter
- Amanda Magarian (born 1984), American pair skater
- Amanda Mair (born 1994), Swedish pianist, singer, and songwriter
- Amanda Majeski (born 1984), American operatic soprano
- Amanda Makela (born 1993), Canadian ice hockey player
- Amanda Manente (born 2011), Brazilian rhythmic gymnast
- Amanda Manopo (born 1999), Indonesian actress, entrepreneur, model, and singer
- Amanda Marcotte (born 1977), American blogger and journalist
- Amanda Marsalis, American filmmaker and photographer
- Amanda Marshall (born 1972), Canadian singer
- Amanda Martin, British politician
- Amanda Martínez (born 2000), Chilean field hockey player
- Amanda Matta (born 1995), American television and social media commentator
- Amanda Matthews (born 1968), American painter and sculptor
- Amanda McBaine, American director and producer
- Amanda McBroom (born 1947), American actress, singer, and songwriter
- Amanda McDougall, Canadian politician
- Amanda McFarland (1832–1912), American missionary
- Amanda McGill (born 1980), American politician
- Amanda McGrory (born 1986), American wheelchair athlete
- Amanda McKenzie, Australian climate change advocate
- Amanda McKerrow (born 1964), American ballet dancer
- Amanda Mealing (born 1967), English actress, director, and producer
- Amanda Means (born 1945), American artist and photographer
- Amanda Melby, American actress and producer
- Amanda H. Mercier (born 1975), American judge
- Amanda Merrill (born 1951), American politician
- Amanda Michalka (born 1991), American singer and actress
- Amanda Michalopoulou (born 1966), Greek author
- Amanda Micheli, American filmmaker
- Amanda Miguel (born 1956), Argentine singer
- Amanda Millar (born 1967), Australian politician
- Amanda Milling (born 1975), English politician
- Amanda Mondol (born 1965), Colombian sport shooter
- Amanda Montejano, Mexican mathematician
- Amanda Montell (born 1992), American author, linguist, and writer
- Amanda Morris, American academic and chemist
- Amanda Muggleton (born 1951), English–Australian actress

=== N ===
- Amanda Nedweski (born 1975), American financial analyst and politician
- Amanda Nevill (born 1957), British arts administrator
- Amanda Ngabirano (born 1978), Ugandan academic and urban planner
- Amanda Nguyen (born 1991), American civil rights activist and social entrepreneur
- Amanda Nielsen (1866–1953), Danish cabaret singer
- Amanda Nildén (born 1998), Swedish soccer player
- Amanda Noar (born 1962), English actress
- Amanda Noelle (born 1983), American singer, songwriter, and worship leader
- Amanda Noret, American actress
- Amanda Nunes (born 1988), Brazilian mixed martial artist
- Amanda Nylander (born 1990), Swedish figure skater

=== O ===
- Amanda Oakley, English–New Zealand dermatologist
- Amanda Obdam (born 1993), Thai actress and model
- Amanda Oleander (born 1989), American artist and illustrator
- Amanda Olivares (born 1966), Mexican beauty queen
- Amanda Oliveira (born 1987), Brazilian water polo player
- Amanda Ooms (born 1964), Dutch–Swedish actress, artist, and writer
- Amanda Overland (born 1981), Canadian short track speed skater
- Amanda Overmyer (born 1984), American singer
- Amanda Owen (born 1974), English shepherdess and writer

=== P ===
- Amanda Palmer (born 1976), American musician, singer and songwriter
- Amanda Peet (born 1972), American actress
- Amanda Perez (born 1980), American singer
- Amanda Peterson (1971–2015), American actress
- Amanda Petrusich (born 1980), American music journalist
- Amanda Pilke (born 1990), Finnish actress
- Amanda Plummer (born 1957), American actress

=== R ===
- Amanda Randolph (1896–1967), American actress, musician and singer
- Amanda Ratnayake (born 1990), Sri Lankan beauty queen and businesswoman
- Amanda Rawles (born 2000), Indonesian actress, model and singer
- Amanda Redman (born 1957), English actress
- Amanda Reid (born 1996), Australian Paralympic cyclist and swimmer
- Amanda Ribas (born 1993), Brazilian mixed martial artist
- Amanda Righetti (born 1983), American actress
- Amanda Rummery (born 1997), Canadian Paralympic sprinter
- Amanda Rylander (1832–1920), Swedish actress

=== S ===
- Amanda Sage (born 1978), American painter
- Amanda Samaroo (born 1992), Trinidadian cricket player
- Amanda Sampedro (born 1993), Spanish soccer player
- Amanda Sánchez (born 1996), American softball player
- Amanda Sandrelli (born 1964), Italian actress
- Amanda Schott (born 1996), Brazilian weightlifter
- Amanda Schull (born 1978), American actress and ballet dancer
- Amanda Schulman (born 1980), Swedish television producer
- Amanda Seales (born 1981), American activist, actress, author, comedian, podcaster, and singer
- Amanda Septimo (born 1991), American politician
- Amanda Serrano (born 1988), Puerto Rican boxer, mixed martial artist, and wrestler
- Amanda Setton (born 1985), American actress
- Amanda Seyfried (born 1985), American actress and singer
- Amanda Shaw (born 1990), American Cajun fiddler and singer
- Amanda Shelton (born 1990), Guamanian politician
- Amanda Shires (born 1982), American fiddler, singer, and songwriter
- Amanda Sidwall (1844–1892), Swedish illustrator and painter
- Amanda Siebert, Canadian author
- Amanda Simanek, American epidemiologist
- Amanda Simard (born 1989), Canadian politician
- Amanda Simeão (born 1994), Brazilian épée fencer
- Amanda Simper (born 1968), Australian canoe sprinter
- Amanda Simpson (born 1961), American businesswoman and politician, first openly transgender woman political appointee
- Amanda Sobhy (born 1993), American squash player
- Amanda Solloway (born 1961), English politician
- Amanda Somerville (born 1979), American singer, songwriter, and vocal coach
- Amanda Sørensen (born 1985), Danish BMX cyclist
- Amanda Staehely, American politician
- Amanda Staveley (born 1973), English business executive
- Amanda Steele (born 1999), American actress, internet personality, and model
- Amanda Stepto (born 1970), Canadian actress and disk jockey
- Amanda Stewart (born 1959), Australian poet
- Amanda Sthers (born 1978), French filmmaker, novelist, playwright, and screenwriter
- Amanda Stoker (born 1982), Australian politician
- Amanda Strang (born 1980), French actress, model, singer, and television presenter
- Amanda Stretton (born 1973), English broadcaster, journalist, and racing driver
- Amanda Strydom (born 1956), South African singer and songwriter
- Amanda Sudano (born 1982), American model, singer, and songwriter
- Amanda Sussman (born 1972), Canadian author, speaker
- Amanda Svensson (born 1987), Swedish author
- Amanda Swart, South African biochemist
- Amanda Swenson (1852–1919), Swedish-born American soprano singer
- Amanda Swisten (born 1978), American actress and model
- Amanda Swope (born 1988), American politician

=== T ===
- Amanda Tapping (born 1965), English–born Canadian actress
- Amanda Tenfjord (born 1997), Greek–Norwegian singer and songwriter
- Amanda Terry (born 1975), Canadian makeup artist
- Amanda Thane (1953–2012), Australian operatic soprano
- Amanda Thiele (born 2002), American ice hockey goaltender
- Amanda Thornborough (born 1990), Canadian rugby union player
- Amanda Tipples (born 1966), English judge
- Amanda Tobin (born 1960), Australian tennis player
- Amanda Todd (1996–2012), Canadian student and victim of cyberbullying
- Amanda Toll, American politician
- Amanda Trunzo (born 1989), American ice hockey player

=== V ===
- Amanda Vaill, American screenwriter
- Amanda Vanstone (born 1952), Australian politician
- Amanda Varela (1911–2000), Argentine actress
- Amanda Vázquez (born 1984), Puerto Rican volleyball player
- Amanda Vickery (born 1962), English historian, professor, and writer
- Amanda Vilanova (born 1991), Puerto Rican model
- Amanda Villepastour (born 1958), Australian ethnomusicologist and musician
- Amanda Vincent, Canadian conservationist and marine biologist

=== W ===
- Amanda Wainwright (born 1976), English tennis player
- Amanda Wakeley (born 1962), English fashion designer
- Amanda Walker (born 1935), English actress
- Amanda Walsh, Canadian actress
- Amanda Ware (born 1992), Australian model
- Amanda Waring, English activist, actress, comedian, and singer
- Amanda Warren (born 1982), American actress
- Amanda Weir (born 1986), American swimmer
- Amanda Weltman (born 1979), South African theoretical physicist
- Amanda Wilkinson (born 1982), Canadian singer
- Amanda Wilson (born 1980), English singer and songwriter
- Amanda Woodcroft (born 1993), Canadian field and indoor hockey player

== Fictional characters ==
- Amanda, from the teen drama The Next Step
- Amanda, from the Colley Cibber play Love's Last Shift and its sequel by John Vanbrugh, The Relapse
- Amanda, from the Highlander franchise
- Amanda Becker, from the teen parody Not Another Teen Movie
- Amanda Beckett, from the teen romantic comedy Can't Hardly Wait
- Amanda Bellows, from the ABC fantasy comedy I Dream of Jeannie
- Amanda Benson, from the television movie Swindle
- Amanda Bentley, the titular character from the Candice F. Ransom novel Amanda
- Amanda Brotzman, from the BBC science fiction series Dirk Gently's Holistic Detective Agency
- Amanda Buckman, from the supernatural black comedy Addams Family Values
- Amanda Carrington, from the ABC soap opera Dynasty
- Amanda Clarke, from ABC mystery drama Revenge
- Helen "Amanda" Collins, from The CW action thriller Nikita
- Amanda De Santa, from the video game Grand Theft Auto V
- Amanda Gaddis, playable Survivor from asymmetrical horror game Identity V
- Amanda Grayson, mother of Spock from the Star Trek franchise
- Amanda Harper, from the Escape Room franchise
- Amanda Hunsaker, from the buddy cop action comedy Lethal Weapon
- Amanda Killman, the main antagonist from the Nickelodeon animated slapstick comedy Bunsen Is a Beast
- Amanda King, from the CBS drama Scarecrow and Mrs. King
- Amanda Krueger, the mother of Freddy Krueger from the A Nightmare on Elm Street franchise
- Amanda LaRusso, the wife of Daniel LaRusso from the Netflix martial arts comedy Cobra Kai
- Amanda Lockhart, from the novel series Kingdom Keepers
- Amanda Lopez, from the Disney XD TV series Milo Murphy's Law
- Amanda Dillon, from the ABC soap opera All My Children
- Amanda Dunfrey, from the science fiction horror film The Mist
- Amanda "Mandy" McAllister, main character in TV show Young Sheldon
- Amanda Prendergast, from the action film Falling Down
- Amanda Rollins, from the NBC crime drama Law and Order: Special Victims Unit
- Amanda Rosewater, from the Syfy science fiction western Defiance
- Amanda Schlup, from the title of the song by Hap Palmer
- Amanda Sefton, from Marvel Comics
- Amanda Tanen, from the ABC comedy drama Ugly Betty
- Amanda Thripp, a character in the 1996 film Matilda
- Amanda Toad, from the video game Star Fox
- Amanda Vale, from the Seven Network soap opera Home and Away
- Amanda Valenciano Libre, from the video game Metal Gear
- Amanda Vaughn, the main protagonist from the ABC comedy drama GCB
- Amanda Waller, from DC Comics
- Amanda Wingfield, from the Tennessee Williams play The Glass Menagerie
- Amanda Woods, from the romantic comedy The Holiday
- Amanda Woodward, from the Fox soap opera Melrose Place
- Amanda Young, the accomplice of Jigsaw from the Saw franchise
- Amanda Zimm, from the teen drama Ready or Not
- Amanda Stern, from the video game "Detroit Become Human"
