= Patricia Felisa Barbeito =

American professor of literature

Patricia Felisa Barbeito is a translator and professor of literature. She teaches at the Rhode Island School of Design and has translated works from Greek to English, including books by Menis Koumandareas, Elias Maglinis, Tatiana Averoff, M. Karagatsis, and Amanda Michalopoulou. She has won several awards for her translations, including a 2022 fellowship from the National Endowment for the Arts, and the 2013 Constantinides Memorial Translation Prize.

== Early life and education ==
Barbeito was born in Athens, Greece. She has a BA in English and American and comparative literature from Brandeis University, and an M.A. and Ph.D. in comparative literature from Harvard University. Her doctoral thesis was Captivity as Consciousness: The Literary and Cultural Imagination of the American Self (1998).

== Career ==
Barbeito is Professor of American Literatures at the Rhode Island School of Design. She specialised in African-American literature and culture of 1940s–1960s, and in particular the protest literature of that time. As of 2022 she is writing a book on Chester Himes, to be titled One Jump Ahead of Disaster: The Politics of Race, Interracial Sex, and Literary Style in Chester Himes's Writing. She also frequently publishes in textbooks about Greek literature and history. In Retelling the Past in Contemporary Greek Literature, Film and Popular Culture, Barbeito and Vangelis Calotychos wrote about the fiction made by Elias Venezis and its connection to the Asia Minor Catastrophe and the 1923 exchange of population. Alongside this, they discussed how these events impacted Venezis' writing during the latter half of that decade, followed by them presenting an English translation of Venezis' 1928 short story "The Isle of Lios". A chapter in Greece in Crisis: The Cultural Politics of Austerity was written by Barbeito covering the concept of literature written about a recent crisis event rather than just a result of and themes about the crisis.

In addition to her academic work, Barbeito is a translator of Greek literature into English. She has translated works by Menis Koumandareas, Elias Maglinis, Tatiana Averoff, M. Karagatsis and Amanda Michacholopoulou. Her translations of shorter works, including short stories and poetry, have been published in anthologies of Greek writing published by Penguin Books, in Words Without Borders, PEN America, Asymptote Blog, Catapult, InTranslation, and Exchanges. She has won several awards for her work: she received a fellowship from the National Endowment for the Arts, won first place in the 2013 MGSA Constantinides Memorial Translation Prize, was shortlisted for the 2014 Greek National Translation Award, and has been the winner of the Constantinides Memorial Translation Prize.

== Bibliography ==
=== Translated Books ===
Greek to English Translations:

- Menis Koumandareas, Their Smell Makes Me Want to Cry (co-translated by Vangelis Calotychos, Birmingham Modern Greek Translations, 2004) ISBN 0-704-42425-8
- Elias Maglinis, The Interrogation (Birmingham Modern Greek Translations, 2013) ISBN 9-780-70442-8294
- Tatiana Averōph-Iōannou, Averoff : portrait of the politician as a young man (Oxford University Press, 2018) ISBN 1-788-74122-6
- M. Karagatsis, The Great Chimera (Aiora, 2019) ISBN 9-786-18504-8990
- Amanda Michacholopoulou, God's Wife (Dalkey Archive Press, 2019) ISBN 9-781-62897-3372

=== Translated Short Stories ===
Greek to English Translations:

- Elias Venezis, The Isle of Lios (co-translated by Vangelis Calotychos, 2021)

== Awards and honors ==
- 2013 Modern Greek Studies Association's Constantinides Memorial Translation Prize for translating Elias Maglinis' The Interrogation
- 2014: Shortlist, Greek National Translation Award for translating Elias Maglinis' The Interrogation
- 2020: Shortlist, National Translation Award for translating Amanda Michacholopoulou's God's Wife
- 2022: Fellowship, National Endowment for the Arts, for the translation of M. Karagatsis's novel Junkermann.
