= Aftalion =

Aftalion is a surname. Notable people with the surname include:

- Albert Aftalion (1874–1956), French economist
- Amandine Aftalion (born 1973), French mathematician
- Fred Aftalion (1922–2022), French chemical engineer
