= Amanda Barusch =

Emeritus professor of social work in New Zealand

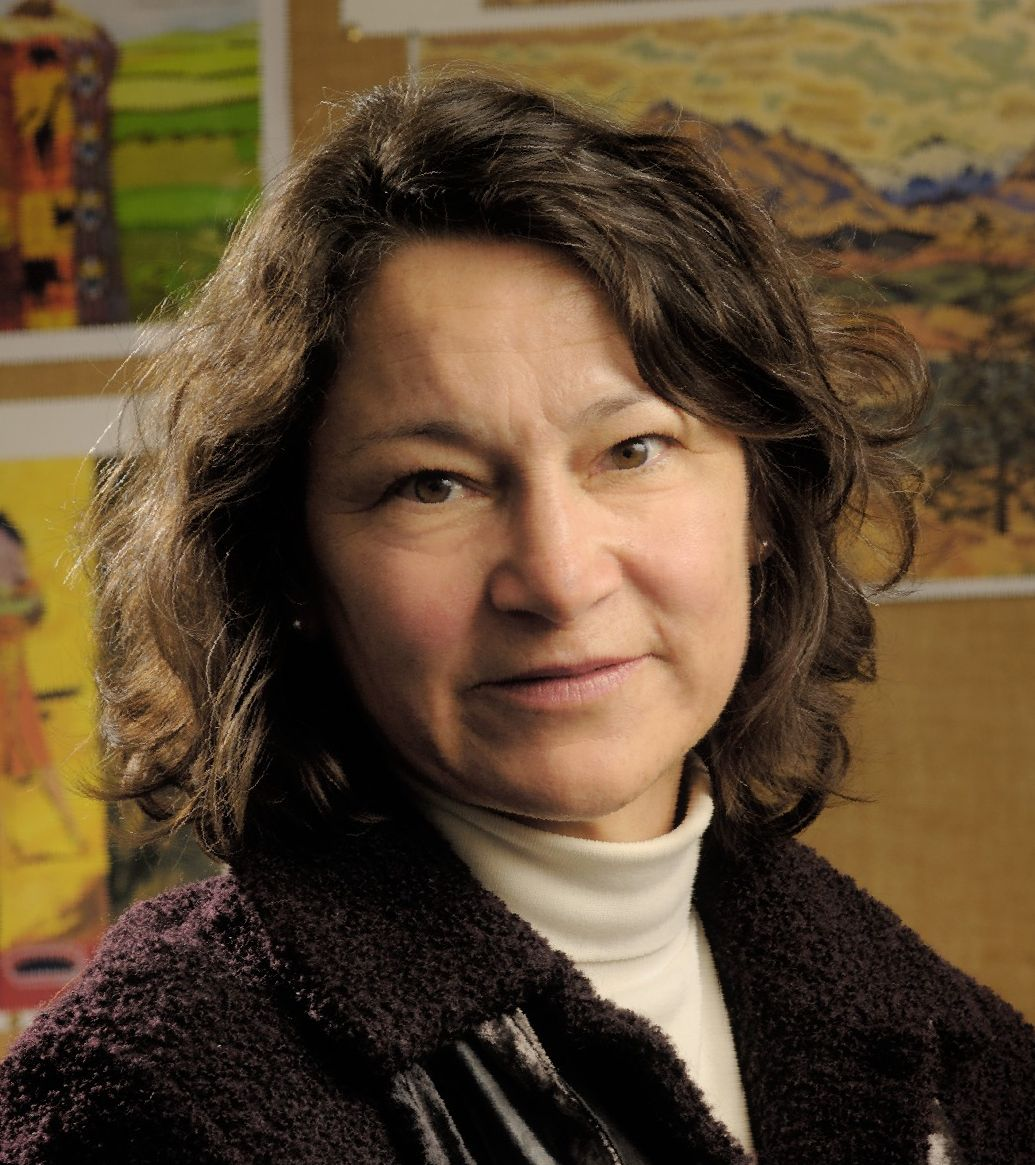

Academic background
- Education: University of California, Berkeley, Reed College, University of Utah
- Theses: Who cares: the relationship between family assistance and formal services provided to the frail elderly in case-managed and traditional service environments (1985); Aphasia (2015)

Amanda Smith Barusch is an American–New Zealand academic, and is professor emerita at the University of Otago, specialising in social work and gerontology. She is also an author and has authored or co-authored six books.

== Academic career ==
Barusch is from California. She completed a Bachelor of Arts in psychology at Reed College and a Master and Doctorate of Social Welfare both at the University of California, Berkeley. Her thesis was on the relationships between formal services and family caregivers for frail elderly people in different living arrangements. Barusch also has a Master of Fine Arts in Creative Writing, which she earned from the University of Utah in 2015. Barusch joined the faculty of the College of Social Work at the University of Utah, where she worked from 1985 to 2019. She was Director of the Social Research Institute and Associate Dean for Research and Doctoral Studies.

Barusch was appointed to Otago as their first professor of social work in 2007, giving her inaugural professorial address in 2008. Barusch's research focuses on gerontology and social work, covering issues such as problems experienced by elderly caregivers, gender differences in caregiving, and experiences of ageism. She has published six books as author or co-author, with her most recent being Aging Angry: Making Peace with Rage, published by Oxford University Press in 2023. She has served on the editorial boards of the Journal of Poverty and Health and Social Work, and as editor-in-chief of the Journal of Gerontological Social Work.

== Selected works ==
Books

- Barusch, Amanda Smith (13 March 2008). Love Stories of Later Life: A Narrative Approach to Understanding Romance. Oxford University Press, New York, NY. doi:10.1093/oso/9780195314045.003.0001. ISBN 978-0-19-531404-5.
- Barusch, Amanda Smith (2024). Aging Angry: Making Peace with Rage. Oxford University Press, New York. doi:10.1093/oso/9780197584644.001.0001. ISBN 978-0-19-758464-4.
- Barusch, Amanda Smith (1 January 1994). Older Women in Poverty: Private Lives and Public Policies. Springer. ISBN 978-0826179609.

Journal articles

- Barusch, Amanda Smith; C. Gringeri; M. George (2011). "Rigor in Qualitative Social Work Research: A Review of Strategies Used in Published Articles". Social Work Research. 35 (1): 11–19. doi:10.1093/swr/35.1.11. Wikidata Q125164147.
- Barusch, Amanda Smith; Spaid WM (1989). "Gender differences in caregiving: why do wives report greater burden?". Gerontologist. 29 (5): 667–676. doi:10.1093/geront/29.5.667. PMID 2513266. Wikidata Q38240831.
- Barusch, Amanda Smith (1988). "Problems and coping strategies of elderly spouse caregivers". Gerontologist. 28 (5): 677–685. doi:10.1093/geront/28.5.677. PMID 3229654. Wikidata Q68038775.
- Mary Jane Taylor; Barusch, Amanda Smith (2004). "Personal, family, and multiple barriers of long-term welfare recipients". Social Work. 49 (2): 175–183. doi:10.1093/sw/49.2.175. PMID 15124958. Wikidata Q44134301.
- C. Gringeri; Barusch, Amanda Smith; C. Cambron (2013). "Epistemology in Qualitative Social Work Research: A Review of Published Articles, 2008-2010". Social Work Research. 37 (1): 55–63. doi:10.1093/swr/svs032. Wikidata Q125164149.
- Christina Gringeri; Barusch, Amanda Smith; Christopher Cambron (2018). "Examining Foundations of Qualitative Research: A Review of Social Work Dissertations, 2008–2010". Journal of Social Work Education. 49 (4): 760–773. doi:10.1080/10437797.2013.812910. Wikidata Q111188937.
