= Cottreau =

Cottreau (pronounced [kɔtʁo]) is a French-language surname. Notable people with the surname include:

- Amanda Cottreau (fl. 1998–present), Canadian folk singer-songwriter
- Ben Cottreau (born 1985), Canadian ice hockey player
- Ernest G. Cottreau (1914–2004), Canadian businessman and educator

== See also ==
- Cottrau
