= Amandina =

Amandina is a given name. Notable people with the name include:

- Amandina of Schakkebroek (1872–1900), Belgian Franciscan missionary sister in China
- Amandina Lihamba (born 1944), Tanzanian academic, actress, playwright, and director

== See also ==
- Amandine (given name)
