= Montejano =

Montejano is a Spanish surname. Notable people with the surname include:

- Amanda Montejano, Mexican mathematician
- David Montejano (born 1948), American sociologist and historian
- Emanuel Montejano (born 2001), Mexican footballer
- María Montejano (born 1986), Spanish skeleton racer

== See also ==
- Luis Gómez-Montejano (1922–2017), Spanish football executive
