= Menis Koumandareas =

Greek writer

- Born: Aristomenis Koumandareas; 4 January 1931; Athens, Greece
- Died: 5 December 2014 (aged 83); Athens, Greece
- Education: University of Athens (no degree)
- Occupation: Writer
- Writing career
- Period: 1962–2006

Aristomenis (Menis) Koumandareas (Greek: Αριστομένης (Μένης) Κουμανταρέας; 4 January 1931 – 5 December 2014) was an acclaimed Greek writer.

== Biography ==
Koumandareas attended classes in the Philosophy and Law schools of the University of Athens, as well as in a drama school, but he did not complete his studies in any of these fields. Instead, he worked for a while as a journalist, and then as a clerk in seafaring and insurance companies.

From 1961 forward until the time of his death Koumandareas was active as a writer and a translator. His texts have been published in many Greek literary periodicals. He was awarded the State Prize for Short Story (twice, 1967 and 1997) and for Novel (twice, 1975 and 2002). from 1982 to 1986 he was a member of the board of directors for the Greek National Opera.

Koumandareas was found dead, a presumed murder victim, on 6 December 2014, in his apartment in Athens. He was 83. According to the coroner's report, he was strangled. Two Romanian men have been arrested as suspects, Ştefan Mătăsăreanu (25) and Cosmin Găitan (29). The first suspect, a long-time acquaintance of Koumandareas, was identified through descriptions from the author's last, autobiographical, novel.

== Works ==
=== Prose ===
- Τα μηχανάκια (Pin-ball Machines), 1962
- Το αρμένισμα (The Saint), 1967
- Τα καημένα (The Burnt Ones), 1972
- Βιοτεχνία Υαλικών (Glass Factory), 1975
- Η κυρία Κούλα (Koula, translated into English by Kaiē Tsitselē), 1978 ISBN 1-564-78406-1
- Το κουρείο (The Barber Shop), 1979
- Σεραφείμ και Χερουβείμ (Seraphim and Cherubim), 1981
- Ο ωραίος Λοχαγός (The Handsome Lieutenant), 1982
- Η φανέλα με τό εννιά (Vest No 9), 1986
- Πλανόδιος Σαλπιγκτής (The Wondering Trumpeter), 1989
- Η συμμορία της Άρπας (The Harps's Gang), 1993
- Θυμάμαι τη Μαρία (I remember Maria), 1994
- Η μυρωδιά τους με κάνει να κλαίω (Their Smell Makes me Cry, translated into English by Patricia Felisa Barbeito and Vangelis Calotychos), 1996 ISBN 0-704-42425-8
- Η μέρα για τα γραπτά κι η νύχτα για το σώμα (Days Good for Writing and Nights Suit the Body), 1999
- Δυο φορές Έλληνας (Twice a Greek), 2001
- Νώε (Noah), 2003
- Η γυναίκα που πετά (The Woman that Flies), 2006

=== Selected translations ===
- Hesse, Hermann, Ντέμιαν (Demian), 1961
- Mc Cullers, Carson, Η μπαλλάντα του λυπημένου καφενείου (The Ballad of the Sad Cafe), 1969
- Faulkner, William, Καθώς ψυχορραγώ (As I Lay Dying), 1970
- Carroll, Lewis, Η Αλίκη στη χώρα των θαυμάτων (Alice's Adventures in Wonderland), 1972
- Büchner, Georg, Λεντς (Lenz), 1977
- Melville, Herman, Μπάρτλεμπυ, ο γραφιάς κι άλλες ιστορίες (Bartleby, the Scrivener), 1980
