= Amandine (given name) =

Amandine is a feminine French given name, a diminutive for Amanda. Notable people with the name include:

- Amandine Aftalion (born 1973), French mathematician
- Amandine Bourgeois (born 1979), French singer
- Amandine Chazot (1991–2024), French paddleboarder
- Amandine Gay (born 1984), French feminist, filmmaker, and actress
- Amandine Henry (born 1989), French football player
- Amandine Leynaud (born 1986), French handball goalkeeper
- Amandine Miquel (born 1984), French association football manager
- Amandine Muller (born 2006), French cyclist
- Amandine Petit (born 1997), French model and Miss France 2021
