= DermNet =

Reference website for clinical dermatology

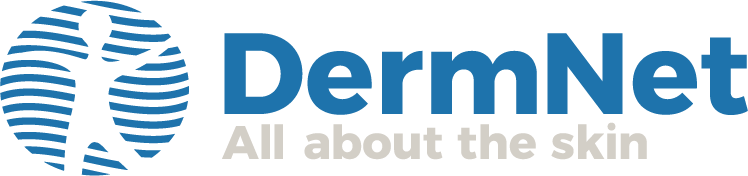
- Website type: Medical resource (dermatology)
- Founded: 1996
- Country of origin: New Zealand
- Founder: Dr Amanda Oakley Dr Mark Duffill Dr Marius Rademaker
- Editor: Dr Ian Coulson
- Website: dermnetnz.org

DermNet is a worldwide clinical resource website about dermatology and skin conditions. Its co-founder and former editor-in-chief is dermatologist and Adjunct Associate Professor Amanda Oakley. The website was launched in 1996 under the umbrella of the New Zealand Dermatological Society, and as of 2017, around 2 million people access the website monthly.

== Purpose ==
The purpose of DermNet is to provide authoritative information about skin diseases, conditions and treatments for dermatologists, students and medical researchers. The website has been praised for articles on little represented conditions, such as hyperhidrosis. As of November 2017, there are 2,300 pages and a library of 25,000 dermatology and dermatopathology images on the website. Pages and images are contributed and reviewed by health professionals from countries including the United States, the United Kingdom, Australia, Canada, and New Zealand. The website also provides online medical courses for the continuing education of dermatologists.

In 2017, DermNet released its first book, Dermatology Made Easy.

DermNet also provides an interactive tool, DermDiag, which allows users to assess their own skin conditions. The tool allows the user to input increasingly specific levels of information regarding their condition, starting from location of ailment, up to number of blemishes, and provides the user with potential diagnoses. The provided diagnoses are ranked from COMMON to RARE, and images of each potential diagnosis are provided to the user, along with clinical features of each condition.

== Awards ==
DermNet won the 2017 New Zealand Ministry of Health Clinician's Challenge Award for the development of a skin disease image recognition tool.

In 2017, Oakley won the Lifetime Achievement Award at the New Zealand Charity Technology Awards for her tenure as creator and editor-in-chief of the website.

In 2018, Oakley was awarded the New Zealand Order of Merit for services to dermatology as part of the Queen's Birthday Honours List.
