= The Happy Ending Music and Reading Series =

The Happy Ending Music and Reading Series is a semimonthly performing arts series which was hosted by Amanda Stern at Joe's Pub in New York, on the first Wednesday of every month - but ended in May 2016.

The event was chosen by New York Magazine, The Village Voice, and NY Press as the best reading series in NYC, and was singled out by the New York Times Magazine for helping to "Keep downtown, NY alive."

Founded by Stern on September 3, 2003, and originally held at the Happy Ending Bar in Chinatown, New York City. Since its inception, the Happy Ending Music and Reading brought together literary and musical talents to share the stage. The success of the series was based largely on Amanda Stern's no-nonsense and oftentimes awkward sense of humor. Of the musicians appearing in the series, Stern required at least one cover song with which the musician must attempt to get the audience to sing along. Of the readers, Stern required "one public risk". Past risks have included karate-chopping wooden boards, freak-dancing with a random member of the audience, spinning a basketball, etc...
