= Cultish =

2021 nonfiction book by Amanda Montell

Cultish: The Language of Fanaticism
- First edition
- Author: Amanda Montell
- Language: English
- Genre: Non-fiction
- Publisher: Harper Wave
- Publication date: June 2021
- Publication place: United States
- Media type: Print
- ISBN: 978-0-06-299315-1

Cultish: The Language of Fanaticism is a 2021 nonfiction book by linguist Amanda Montell about the use of language in cults. It was published on June 15, 2021 by Harper Wave.

== Content ==
Montell argues in Cultish that cults and cultists can be identified in particular through their non-standard use of language – as scholar Scott Lowe put it, "the technical terms, the redefined words, the shorthand, the clichés, the euphemisms, logical distortions, and so on […] set members apart from (and above) their pedestrian neighbors, families, and coworkers". Montell does not necessarily view "cultish" – the "language" she identifies as the set of linguistic tricks cult leaders use to coerce and manipulate members – negatively, but she believes that people should at least be able to recognize it. The book includes analysis of religious groups like the Church of Scientology, the Children of God, Jonestown, and Heaven's Gate; self-help networks and rehabilitation centers like Synanon (to which Montell has a personal connection through her father) and NXIVM; multi-level marketing schemes like Amway; fitness societies like SoulCycle, CrossFit, and Peloton; and political groups and affiliations like QAnon.

== Reception ==
Reviewers have noted the colloquial style of the work. Erin Downey Howerton for Booklist, for example, writes that "[r]eading Montell is like a satisfying chat session with your bestie [best friend]—albeit one that focuses on obsession, language tricks, and manipulation". A reviewer for Kirkus Reviews called the book's prose "accessible".

Scholars overall viewed Montell's book as a good introduction for non-scholars to some concepts in the academic study of new religious movements. Lowe for Nova Religio writes that the book is a "fascinating example of a nonacademic telling academics what they already know with a clarity that seems like revelation". Academic Jennifer Wilson for The New Republic writes that "most people who read Cultish will feel convinced they have, at some point in their lives, been in a cult". One reviewer for Publishers Weekly notes that "the personal digressions… occasionally distract from the bigger picture", but they overall believe that Montell is an engaging and informed narrator.

== Adaptation into docuseries ==
Topic Studios received the rights to adapt Cultish into a television documentary series in November 2022, as reported by Deadline. The documentary series will feature those groups discussed in the book. The series is being produced with help from Montell and Carly Hugo and Matt Parker of the studio Loveless.
