= Manda (name) =

Manda is a given name and a surname which may refer to:

== Given name ==
- Manda Aufochs Gillespie, ecological designer, environmental consultant, and author
- Manda Jagannath (1951–2025), Indian politician
- Manda Vijay Mhatre, Indian politician elected in 2014
- Manda Ophuis (born 1980), Dutch singer and composer

== Surname ==
- Carl Manda (1886-1983), American Major League Baseball player in September 1914
- Hisako Manda (born 1958), Japanese actress and 1978 Miss Universe contestant
- Joie Manda, American music executive
- Kunitoshi Manda (born 1956), Japanese film director, screenwriter and film critic
- Lucenio Manda, Filipino activist and politician
- Maria Manda (born 2003), Bangladeshi footballer
- Milorad Mandić Manda (1961-2016), Serbian actor
- Siadabida Manda (born 1970), footballer from the Democratic Republic of Congo

== Fictional characters ==
- Manda, a monster from the 1963 film Atragon and a later monster in the Godzilla franchise

== See also ==
- Amanda (name)
- Manda (disambiguation)
