= Cottrau =

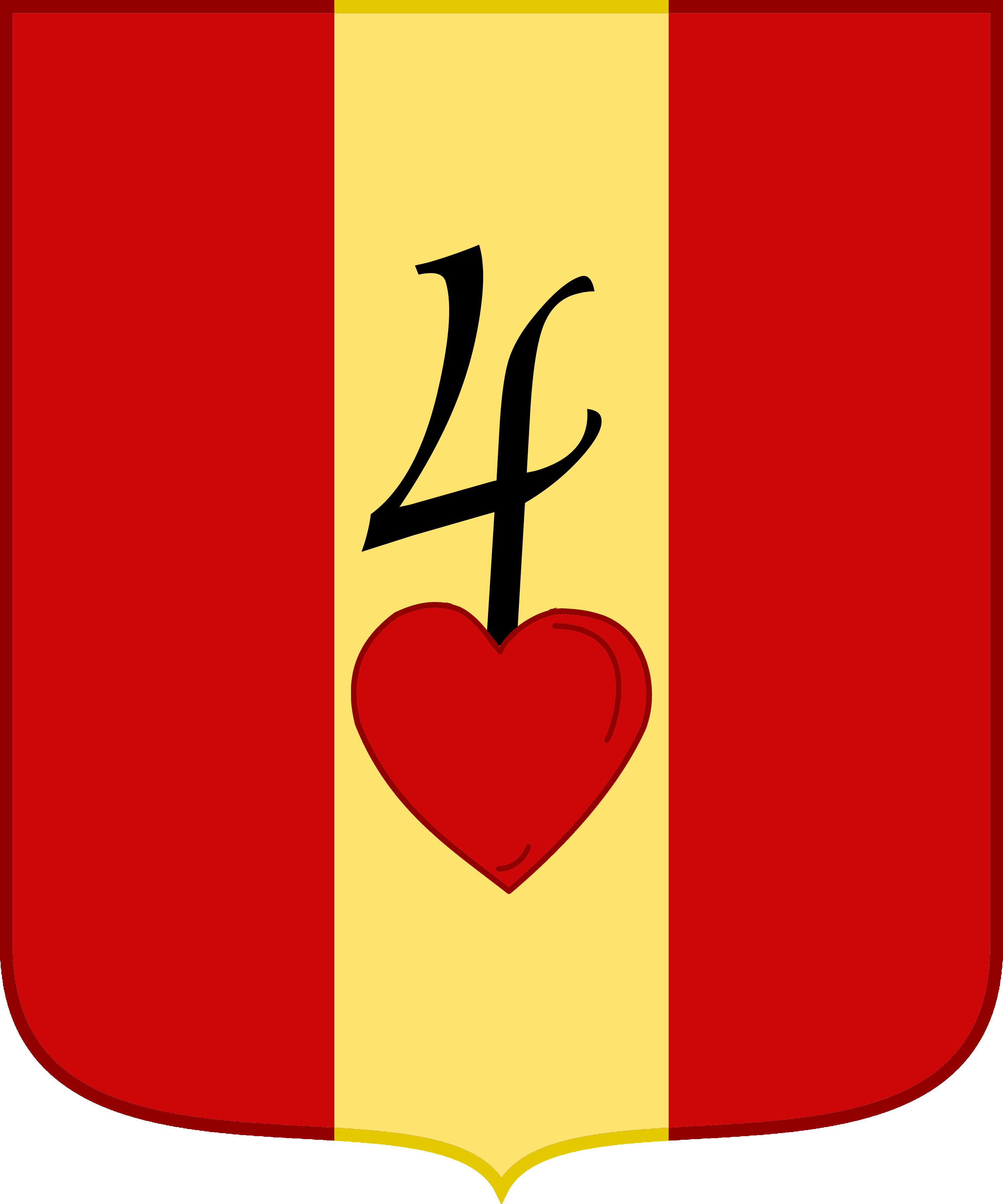
Coat of arms of the Cottrau family

Cottrau (pronounced [kɔtʁo]) is a French surname. Notable people with the surname include:

- Félix Cottrau (1799–1852), French painter
- Guillaume Louis Cottrau (1797–1847), French-Italian composer and music publisher
- Teodoro Cottrau (1827–1879), Italian composer, lyricist, publisher, journalist and politician

== See also ==
- Cottreau
