= Amanda Oakley =

New Zealand dermatologist

Amanda Oakley CNZM
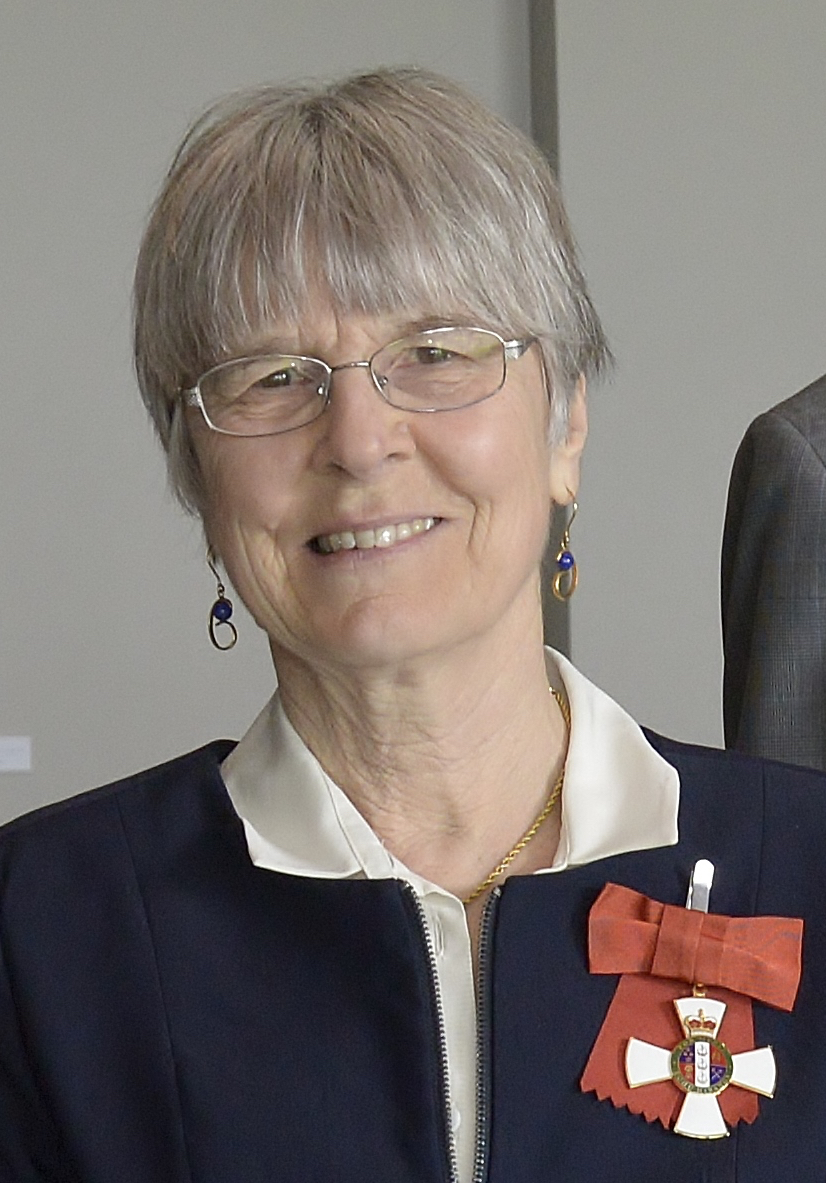
- Oakley in 2018
- Education: University of Bristol
- Years active: 1987–present
- Known for: Founder of DermNet NZ
- Medical career
- Profession: Dermatology
- Institutions: Waikato Hospital

Amanda Margaret Meredith Oakley CNZM is a New Zealand-based dermatologist, specialising in melanoma research and teledermatology. She is a founder and former editor-in-chief of DermNet.

== Medical career ==
Oakley graduated from the University of Bristol in 1979, and completed postgraduate studies in Auckland, London and Durham before emigrating to New Zealand. She has been a practicing dermatologist at Waikato Hospital since 1987.

In 1995, Oakley and a group of New Zealand dermatologists created DermNet, a medical resource site focused on dermatology. Oakley learned how to code and programme to create the website, which was made to be a source of information for dermatologists and patients. DermNet was registered as a charitable trust in 2013.

Oakley has been the Clinical Director of the Department of Dermatology of the Waikato District Health Board, and currently teaches as an Honorary and Adjunct Associate Professor at the University of Auckland's Waikato Clinical Campus. Oakley was the president of both the New Zealand Dermatological Society and the Australian and New Zealand Vulvovaginal Society from 2011 to 2013.

== Honours ==
In March 2017, Oakley won the Lifetime Achievement Award at the New Zealand Charity Technology Awards for her tenure as creator and editor-in-chief of DermNet.

In November 2017, DermNet won the New Zealand Ministry of Health's Clinician's Challenge in the active project/development category for the proposal to train artificial intelligence software to recognise skin diseases in images through pattern recognition.

In the 2018 Queen's Birthday Honours, Oakley was appointed a Companion of the New Zealand Order of Merit, for services to dermatology.

== Selected publications ==
- Teledermatology. CRC Press (2002).
- Dermatology Made Easy. Great Britain: Scion Publishing Ltd (2017).
- Paediatric Dermatology - A Concise Guide Great Britain: Stanford Publishing Ltd (2015).
