= Amanda Grace =

American singer-songwriter

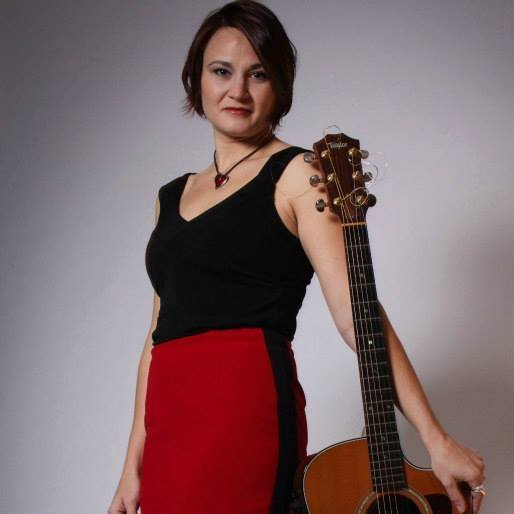

Background information
- Origin: St. Paul, Minnesota, United States
- Genres: Adult contemporary, soul, acoustic rock, Christian, children's music
- Years active: 2010–present
- Website: musicbyamandagrace.com

Amanda Grace is a singer-songwriter born in St. Paul, Minnesota. Grace writes, releases and performs acoustic rock, soul, children's music and Christian music. Her career originally began with children's music. Grace has released three albums, three singles, and is also a part of a women's contemporary folk band called Wildflower.

== Background ==
As a child, Grace dreamed of being a singer and received encouragement from her mother. When she was young she would play music with her sister and play music for churches. Her childhood instrument was the piano, on which she wrote many of her first songs. Grace began writing at the age of six.

She graduated from Bemidji High School. In 1998, she moved to Winona to attend the Winona State University. Grace received a degree from Winona State University in communications with a minor in music. It was during college that she learned to play the acoustic guitar

Some of the inspiration for her music comes from the death of her nephew Bryce Breuer and later her sister's husband Tim Breuer.

== Career ==
A few years after graduation from Winona State University, Grace began to write and play music for children. In 2010 she released her first children's album Trains, Cars & a Trip to Mars under her own label Any Kind of Music. Grace's cover of "You Are My Sunshine", which appears on the album, was featured in Parents magazine in 2010. In August 2012, Grace released an acoustic rock/adult contemporary album called Embrace. In 2014, Grace released the Keeping Hearts EP which added six new acoustic rock songs to her collection of released music.

In 2015 Grace's single "Los Angeles" was in the Top Five of the Upcoming100.com's "Emerging Artists" category. The single which was released in November of that year was also reviewed by NeuFutur Magazine. It was produced by Scotty Lund and featured rapper Trayvon Ellis, professionally known as Prime Blaq. The words for the song were written at an LA Airport prior boarding a plane.

Grace does not claim a particular genre of music, although she credits Mariah Carey and The Cranberries as inspirations.

== Live performances ==
In the past she has appeared at the Winona's Blooming Grounds Coffee House; club owner Amy Jo Marks commented that Grace's style was like that of Norah Jones. In June 2014 she appeared at Ed's No Name bar in Winona with her group Wildflower. The event tied in with the release of her Keeping Hearts album. In September 2014 she was scheduled to appear at the Mid West Music Festival. In 2015, she appeared on the first day of Wisconsin music and art festival Ashley for the Arts. On March 11, 2016, she performed at the Over the Back Fence show held at the St. Mane Theatre in downtown Lanesboro, Minnesota.

== Discography ==
Singles
Title	Release info	Year	Notes
"Los Angeles"		2015	No. 2 spot in the "emerging artists" category
"Better Life"		2016	

Albums and EPs
Title	Release info	Year	Description	Notes
Rayne Angel	Any Kind Of Music	2018	Album	
Trains, Cars & a Trip to Mars	Any Kind Of Music	2010	Album	Children's album dedicated to her nephew Bryce Breuer
Embrace	Any Kind Of Music	2012	Album	
Better Life	Any Kind Of Music	2017	EP	
Keeping Hearts	Any Kind Of Music	2014	EP	
