= Amanda Hollis-Brusky =

American political scientist

Amanda L. Hollis-Brusky is an American constitutional law scholar who specializes in the politics of the U.S. Supreme Court and the conservative legal movements of originalism and textualism. She is the chair of the politics department at Pomona College in Claremont, California.

== Early life and education ==
Hollis-Brusky majored in political science and philosophy at Boston University, graduating in 2003. She then pursued a doctorate at the University of California, Berkeley, which she earned in 2010. Her dissertation was titled "The Federalist Society and the Structural Constitution: An Epistemic Community at Work".

== Career ==
Hollis-Brusky joined the politics department at Pomona College in 2011. In 2014, she won the Wig Award, the college's highest faculty honor, in recognition of her teaching. She is frequently consulted by media outlets on Supreme Court issues. In 2015, she interviewed Supreme Court Justice Sonia Sotomayor, and in 2020 she interviewed U.S. Attorney General Eric Holder and testified before the U.S. House Judiciary Committee on judicial independence.

Her first book, Ideas with Consequences, about the Federalist Society, won the 2016 C. Herman Pritchett award, the American Political Science Association's award for best legal studies book.

Her second book, Separate but Faithful, was written with Joshua C. Wilson and focuses on the Christian conservative legal movement. Reviewer Daniel Bennett, writing in Perspectives on Politics, called it "a detailed and methodologically impressive account" that uses "an innovative theoretical framework" and "has the potential to wield lasting influence".

She is an editor of The Monkey Cage blog at The Washington Post.

== Personal life ==
Hollis-Brusky lives in Claremont, California.

== Books ==
- Ideas with Consequences: The Federalist Society and the Conservative Counterrevolution. Oxford University Press. January 30, 2015. ISBN 978-0199385522.
- With Wilson, Joshua C. (October 15, 2020). Separate but Faithful: The Christian Right's Radical Struggle to Transform Law and Legal Culture. New York: Oxford University Press. ISBN 978-0190637262.
