= Journal of Social Work Education =

- Discipline: Social work
- Language: English
- Edited by: Danielle Parrish

Publication details
- Former name(s): Journal of Education for Social Work
- History: 1965–present
- Publisher: Taylor & Francis
- Frequency: Quarterly
- Impact factor: 1.000 (2017)

Standard abbreviations
- ISO 4: J. Soc. Work Educ.

Indexing
- ISSN: 1043-7797
- LCCN: 2011201770
- OCLC no.: 818922701

Links
- Journal homepage; Online access; Online archive

The Journal of Social Work Education is a quarterly peer-reviewed academic journal dedicated to education in the fields of social work and social welfare. It was established in 1965 as the Journal of Education for Social Work, obtaining its current name in 1985. It is published by Taylor & Francis on behalf of the Council on Social Work Education. The editor-in-chief is Danielle Parrish (Baylor University). According to the Journal Citation Reports, the journal has a 2017 impact factor of 1.000.
