= Amanda Simanek =

American epidemiologist

Amanda Simanek is an American epidemiologist. Previously, she was a professor at the University of Wisconsin–Milwaukee's Joseph J. Zilber School of Public Health. She is currently at the Rosalind Franklin University of Medicine and Science as the Director of the Michael Reese Foundation Center for Health Equity Research and Associate Professor of Epidemiology. She is also a founding member of Those Nerdy Girls.

She is a social epidemiologist and focuses on the study of the "psychosocial determinants of infectious disease, links between infection and chronic disease, and the pathways by which social inequities in health occur across the lifecourse and across generations."

== Biography ==
Simanek grew up in the Chicago suburbs. She graduated from the University of Wisconsin–Madison with degrees in women's studies and political science. She went to the University of Michigan School of Public Health for graduate school, earning a Master of Public Health in International Health Epidemiology and a PhD in Epidemiologic Sciences.
