= Amanda Blain =

Canadian CEO, speaker, blogger, and Internet personality (born 1980)

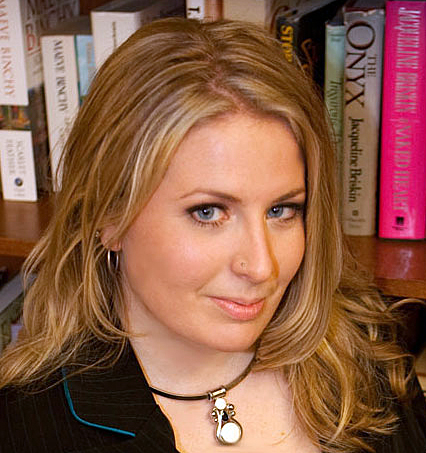
- Born: 1980 (age 44–45); Hamilton, Ontario, Canada
- Occupation(s): Business owner, journalist, and internet personality
- Years active: 2009 to present
- Known for: Girlfriend Social, Google Plus
- Website: http://www.amandablain.com

Amanda Blain (born 1980) is a business owner, journalist, speaker, and Internet personality from Toronto, Ontario, Canada. She is best known for being the founder, owner and web developer of Girlfriend Social, a women-only friendship making website. She is also known for her activity relating to Google Plus, where she acquired 5 million followers, was the 20th most followed person in the world and the number 1 most followed Canadian before Google Plus shut down.

== Early life ==
Blain was born in Hamilton, Ontario, Canada. She studied Archaeology and Museum Studies. She was not a fan of math and science, but ended up becoming full stack web developer, starting when she was 14.

== Professional career ==
=== Girlfriend social ===
Girlfriend Social's Logo

In 2009, Blain designed, developed, and launched Girlfriend Social, a female friendship website, stating, "Although there are many social networks online, most are designed to deal with business networking, dating, or connecting with people you already know, but there are very few sites that connect new friends." Blain came up with the idea following a move to a new city and starting a new job with mostly male co-workers. The site is designed to allow women around the world to make new friends, does not charge users and has over 500,000 members making it the largest female friendship-only social site in the world.

Girlfriend Social was voted "Favorite Website for Meeting New Friends" by About.com readers in their Readers' Choice Awards in 2012.

=== Google plus ===
Blain joined Google Plus on its first day of the official beta, June 29, 2011, and was placed on Google's Suggested User List under the technology category on December 15, 2011. Blain was known for speaking about and promoting the platform, calling it "a true Social Media platform." A frequent user of the hangouts feature on the Google Plus platform, Blain was voted by the community as "Number 1 Hangout User". Blain states that she has met thousands of people in real life after meeting virtually in Google hangouts first. She spoke publicly about the closing of Google Plus on April 1, 2019, saying it was "Amazing. Life changing experience"

=== Journalist ===
Blain started a personal blog and multiple technology-focused websites in 2012. She covers topics like pop culture, video games, social media, and virtual reality on these sites and others.
