= New Zealand Dermatological Society =

Not-for-profit learned society in New Zealand

The New Zealand Dermatological Society is a not-for-profit incorporated society for dermatologists in New Zealand. Its website for public education, DermNet, was started in 1996.
