= Amanda Oleander =

American contemporary artist (born 1989)

Amanda Oleander Rudman
- Born: Amanda Oleander; December 2, 1989 (age 35) Fort Lauderdale, Florida
- Occupation: Artist, illustrator
- Spouse: Joey Rudman
- Children: 1

Website
- www.amandaoleander.com

Amanda Oleander (Rudman) (born December 2, 1989) is a professional contemporary artist known for her intimate and relatable depictions of everyday life.

== Early life and education ==
Oleander was born in Fort Lauderdale, Florida, to a Venezuelan mother and Chilean father. She showed a strong interest in art from an early age and began drawing and painting as a child. Oleander went on to study Fine Arts at the University of North Carolina at Charlotte, where she honed her skills in drawing, painting, and sculpture.

== Career ==
Oleander's career as an artist began to take off in 2014 when she became E! Entertainment’s first in-house artist who illustrated for their articles online. Her work quickly gained a following, and she was soon recognized for her unique style, which blends realism with whimsy and playfulness. In 2015, Oleander's Endangered Species paintings catapulted her career. Oleander was then invited as Vanity Fair’s artist in Residence at Art Basel 2016.

Oleander's artwork has garnered international attention, selling and shipping to over 110 countries. Beyond her acclaimed painting series, Oleander's daily life illustrations gained such prominence that she was invited to give a TEDx talk at San Diego University. Her illustrations capture ordinary moments, such as cuddling in bed or cooking dinner, with an emotional depth and intimacy that resonates with audiences. Along with her impressive career as an artist, Oleander has collaborated with various notable brands and organizations. She has worked with companies such as Volvo, Sundance, and KIND, in addition to partnering with non-profit organizations such as Greenpeace and the World Wildlife Fund, supporting their causes.

== Personal life ==
Oleander is married to fellow artist Joey Rudman, who often appears in her art. The couple currently resides in Los Angeles, California.

== Legacy ==
Amanda Oleander's work has been praised for its ability to capture the small, intimate moments of everyday life in a way that is relatable and emotionally resonant. Her illustrations have been featured in numerous publications, including Forbes, Cosmopolitan, and The Huffington Post. She has been profiled by outlets such as CBS News and NBC News. In recent years, Oleander has also become an advocate for mental health and self-care, using her platform to raise awareness and reduce the stigma surrounding mental illness.
