= Amanda Michalopoulou =

Greek writer

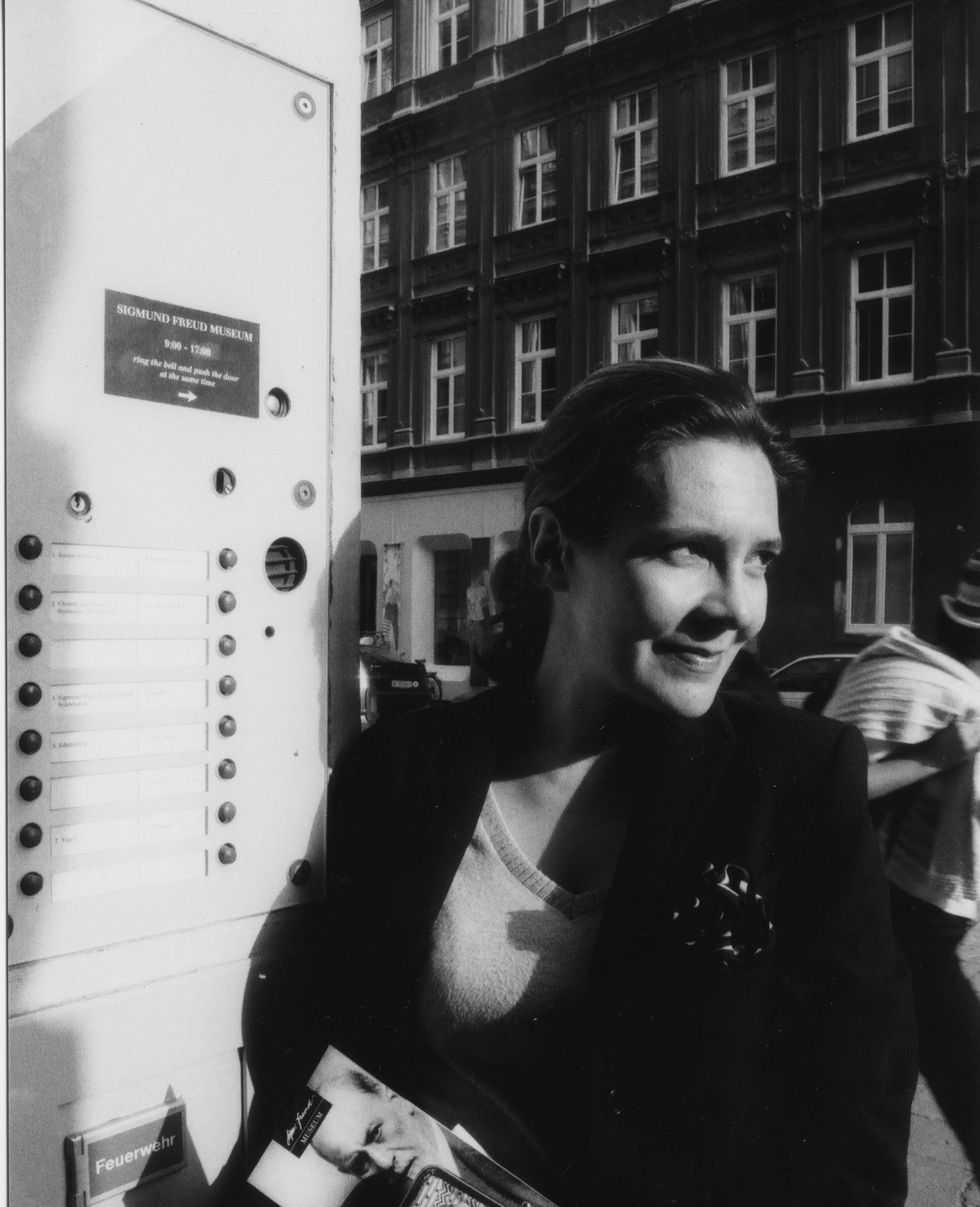
Michalopoulou in 2012

Amanda Michalopoulou is a Greek author. She has published nine novels, several collections of short stories and books for children. Her works have been translated in more than twenty languages and have won the National Endowment for the Arts International Literature Award 2008, the Athens Academy Prize and the Diavazo Award. She was short listed twice for the ALTA Literary Prize in USA.

== Biography ==
Amanda Michalopoulou was born in Athens, Greece and currently teaches creative writing. She previously studied French literature in Athens, and journalism in Paris. She lives in Athens with her husband, photographer Dimitris Tsoumplekas.

== Career ==
Michalopoulou began by writing short stories, and won the Best Short Story Prize from Revmata, a Greek literary magazine, in 1993. In 1994, she published her first collection of short stories, Éxo i zoi ine políchromi (1994; tr: Life is colourful out there). Her other collections of short stories, published subsequently, include Lamperi Mera (Bright Day) and Tha Ithela (2008; "I'd Like"). Tha Ithela won the National Endowment for the Arts' International Literature Award 2008 for the English translation, and was on the long list for the Best Translated Book Award. Her stories have been published in the Harvard Review, PEN Magazine, Asymptote, Brooklyn Rail, World Literature Today and The Guardian.

She wrote several novels, including Jandes (1996; "Octopus Garden"), which won the Diavazo Critics' Prize in Greece; Osses forés antéxis (1998; "As many times as you can bear it"), Paliókeros (2001; "Bloody awful weather"), Pos na kryfteis (2010; "How to Hide"), and Lamperi mera (2012; "Bright Day"). Michalopoulou has also written several children's books. In collaboration with Dimitris Tsoumplekas she wrote I Hina (2008; "The Goose"). Her works have been translated into more than 20 languages. She was a contributing editor for the newspaper Kathimerini from 1990 to 2008. More information at amandamichalopoulou.com

== Works ==
- Έξω η ζωή είναι πολύχρωμη, Εκδόσεις Καστανιώτη, 1994
- Γιάντες, Εκδόσεις Καστανιώτη, 1996
- Το σπίτι που πετάει, Άμμος, 1997
- Όσες φορές αντέξεις, Εκδόσεις Καστανιώτη, 1998
- Γιατί γεννήθηκα, Εκδόσεις Πατάκη, 2000
- Δύο σπίτια, Εκδόσεις Πατάκη, 2000
- Τ' αγαπημένα μου Σαββατοκύριακα, Εκδόσεις Πατάκη, 2000
- Παλιόκαιρος, Εκδόσεις Καστανιώτη, 2001
- Inbox, Απόπειρα, 2002
- Γιατί σκότωσα την καλύτερή μου φίλη, Εκδόσεις Καστανιώτη, 2003
- Αρκεί να μην κόψω τα μαλλιά μου, Εκδόσεις Πατάκη, 2004
- Η μετακόμιση, Εκδόσεις Παπαδόπουλος, 2004
- Οι περιπέτειες της Αεροπλανούλας, Εκδόσεις Πατάκη, 2004
- Θα ήθελα, Εκδόσεις Καστανιώτη, 2005
- Η μετακόμιση, Εκδόσεις Παπαδόπουλος, 2006
- Η εγγονή του Αϊ-Βασίλη, Εκδόσεις Καστανιώτη, 2007
- Πριγκίπισσα Σαύρα, Εκδόσεις Καστανιώτη, 2007
- Εμπιστοσύνη, Τόπος, 2008
- Η χήνα, Εκδόσεις Καστανιώτη, 2008
- Ο Ισίδωρος και ο ναυαγός, Εκδόσεις Πατάκη, 2008
- Η εγγονή του Αϊ-Βασίλη και τα μπισκότα της αγάπης, Εκδόσεις Καστανιώτη, 2009
- Διακοπές στο σπίτι με τον Ισίδωρο, Εκδόσεις Πατάκη, 2010
- Πώς να κρυφτείς, Εκδόσεις Καστανιώτη, 2010
- Η εγγονή του Αϊ-Βασίλη και η εξαφάνιση των ξωτικών, Εκδόσεις Καστανιώτη, 2011
- Όσες φορές αντέξεις, Έθνος, 2011
- Παλιόκαιρος, Έθνος, 2011
- Τ + Υ = Αγάπη για πάντα, Εκδόσεις Πατάκη, 2011
- Έρχεται ο Ίνξορ, Εκδόσεις Πατάκη, 2012
- Λαμπερή μέρα, Εκδόσεις Καστανιώτη, 2012
- Έξω η ζωή είναι πολύχρωμη, Εκδόσεις Καστανιώτη, 2014
- Η γυναίκα του Θεού, Εκδόσεις Καστανιώτη, 2014
- Γιάντες, Εκδόσεις Καστανιώτη, 2018
- Μπαρόκ, Εκδόσεις Καστανιώτη, 2018
