= Amanda Balon =

American actress

Amanda Balon (born 1997) is an American former child actress, vocalist and dancer, best known for playing the title role in the nationwide Broadway tour of the musical Annie. Amanda initially joined the 30th anniversary cast (directed by Broadway director and script lyricist, Martin Charnin) as the youngest orphan, Molly. At age ten, she was given the lead role of Little Orphan Annie. She remained with the production company NETworks Presentations for 3 years.

== Biography ==
Amanda Balon was born in Kansas City, Kansas and was raised in Zimbabwe along with her twin brother and older sister. She has been performing since the age of three. Amanda entered the Daystar Academy of the Performing Arts as their youngest student. She is also a member of the Senior competition travel team.

== Recordings ==
Amanda Balon is part of the all-star cast on the 30th anniversary recording of the Broadway musical released by Time Life Records. Balon sings the never-before-recorded solos from Annie 2. She joins Carol Burnett, Sally Struthers, Kathie Lee Gifford, Andrea McArdle, John Schuck, Harve Presnell, Gary Beach, Marissa O'Donnell and other members from the original cast on the double CD which was produced by Robert Sher and released in June 2008.
