= Amanda Stern =

American writer and literary event organiser

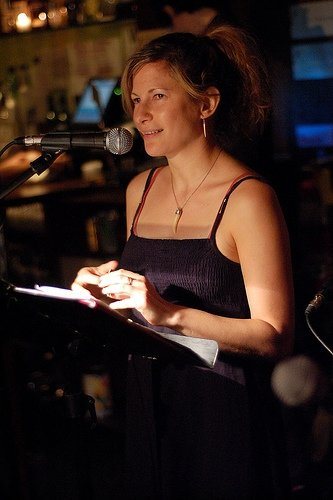
- Amanda Stern hosting The Happy Ending Music and Reading Series.
- Website: www.amandastern.com

Amanda Stern is an American writer and literary event organizer. She has written under the pen names A. J. Stern and Fiona Rosenbloom.

== Career ==
When she was a senior in high school, at Friends Seminary, Stern starred in an off-Broadway production of Sometimes I Wake Up in the Middle of the Night, a play she co-wrote. From there she turned to film, working for Good Machine, Hal Hartley, Ang Lee and Terry Gilliam. She also worked as a comic, co-hosting the Lorne Michaels comedy series "This is Not a Test" alongside Marc Maron at Catch a Rising Star. Soon after, she became an on-air host for Lorne Michaels' Burly Bear Network.

In 2003, Stern founded The Happy Ending Music and Reading Series, which was cited by local critics as one of the best authors' series in New York City. In 2006, she was profiled in the "New York" issue of The New York Times Magazine as one of ten "New Bohemians, helping to keep downtown New York alive". In January 2009, the series moved to uptown to Joe's Pub at the Public Theater. The last event was held in May 2016.

Stern has written eleven books for children under the pseudonyms A. J. Stern and Fiona Rosenbloom. Her debut novel, The Long Haul, was well-received by SFGate. Her 2005 young-adult novel (authored with Rosenbloom pseudonym) You are So Not Invited to My Bat Mitzvah was turned into a 2023 movie of the same title starring Adam Sandler.

Stern has held several residencies at Yaddo and MacDowell. She lives in Fort Greene, Brooklyn.
