= Vangelis Calotychos =

British-Greek academic

Vangelis Calotychos (Βαγγέλης Καλότυχος; born 1963) is a British-Greek scholar of Comparative Literature and Modern Greek studies. He currently serves as the Executive Director of the Modern Greek Studies Association (MGSA) and is a Visiting Associate Professor of Classics at Brown University.

== Education ==
Calotychos was born in London in 1963. He obtained a B.A. in French and Modern Greek from the University of Birmingham and the University of Nice Sophia-Antipolis in 1985. He then moved to the United States, earning an M.A. in English Literature from Ohio State University in 1987, followed by a Ph.D. in Comparative Literature from Harvard University in 1993.

== Career and research ==
Calotychos has held academic positions at Harvard University (1991–1996), New York University (1996–2004), Columbia University where he headed the Modern Greek Seminar, and most recently at Brown University. His research is interdisciplinary, focusing on identity, culture, and politics in Greece, Cyprus, the Middle East, and the Balkans.

As Executive Director of the Modern Greek Studies Association (MGSA), Calotychos has been a vocal advocate for the field of Modern Greek Studies as a "bridge-building" discipline that connects Mediterranean, European, and Middle Eastern studies.

His monograph, Modern Greece: A Cultural Poetics (2003), explored the "discourse of ab-sense"—the imposition of external narratives on the modern Greek state. In The Balkan Prospect (2013), he analyzed Greece's relationship with its Balkan neighbors after 1989, specifically interrogating metaphors of the "bridge" in literature and film.

== Awards and honors ==
- 2013: Edmund Keeley Book Prize (Shared First Prize) for The Balkan Prospect: Identity, Culture, and Politics in Greece after 1989.

== Selected publications ==
- Modern Greece: A Cultural Poetics. Berg, 2003. ISBN 978-1859737163
- Cyprus and Its People: Nation, Identity and Experience in an Unimaginable Community, 1955–1997 (Editor). Westview Press, 1998.
- Manolis Anagnostakis: Poetry and Politics, Silence and Agency in Post-War Greece (Editor). Fairleigh Dickinson University Press, 2012. ISBN 978-1611474664
- The Balkan Prospect: Identity, Culture, and Politics in Greece after 1989. Palgrave MacMillan, 2013. ISBN 978-1137365613
- Their Smell Makes Me Want To Cry by Menis Koumandareas (Translator with Patricia Felisa Barbeito). University of Birmingham, 2004. ISBN 978-0704424241
