= Amanda Montell =

American author, linguist, and writer

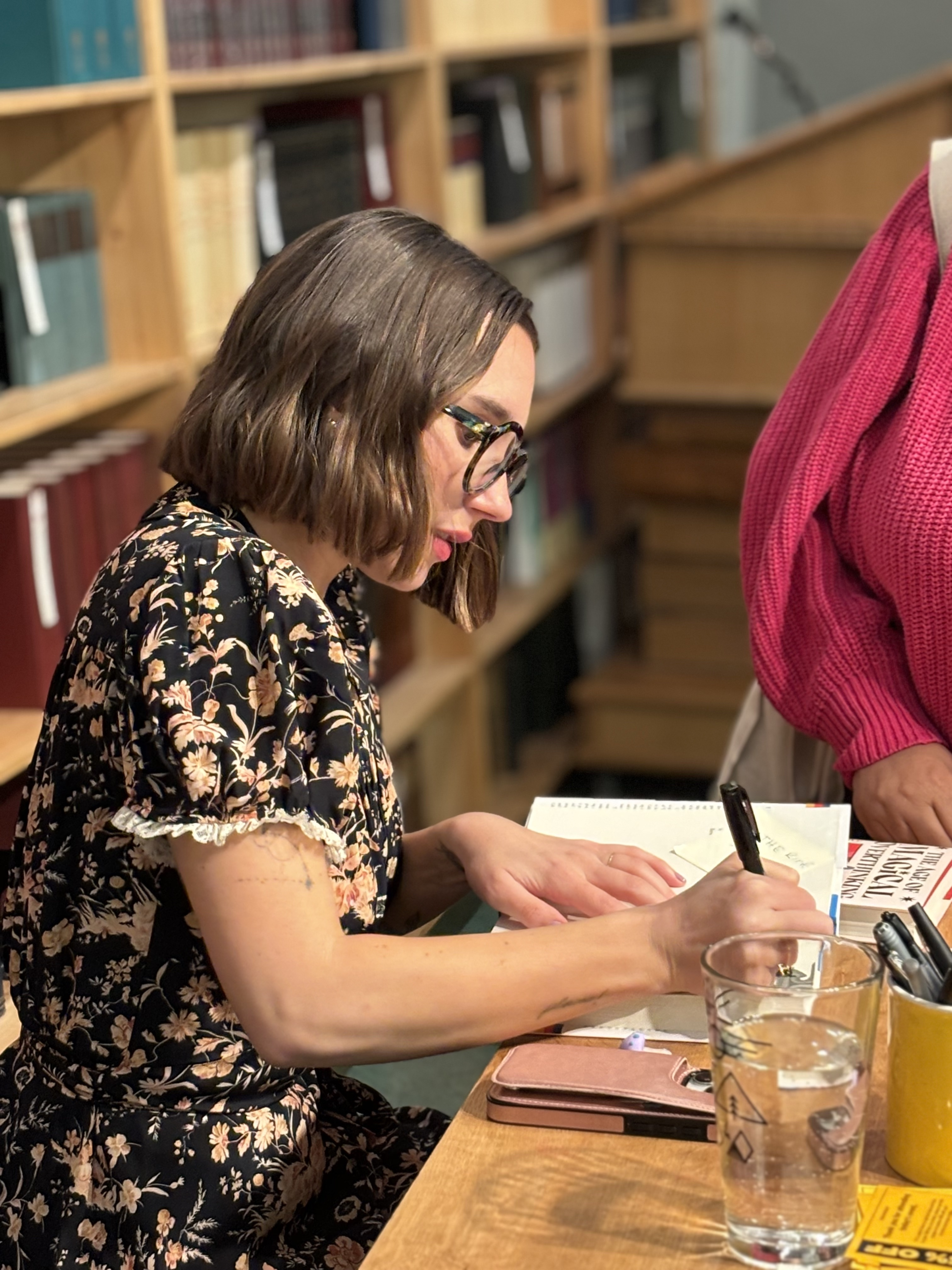
- In 2024, Montell signed copies of her new book, The Age of Magical Overthinking
- Born: February 16, 1992 (age 34); Baltimore, Maryland, U.S.
- Education: New York University
- Writing career
- Genres: Feminist, Nonfiction, Linguistics, Social Science
- Notable works: Wordslut: A Feminist Guide to Taking Back the English Language (2019); Cultish: The Language of Fanaticism (2021); The Age of Magical Overthinking: Notes on Modern Irrationality (2024)
- Website: Amanda Montell

Amanda Montell (born February 16, 1992) is an American author, writer and linguist. She is the author of three books: Wordslut: A Feminist Guide to Taking Back the English Language (2019), Cultish: The Language of Fanaticism (2021), and The Age of Magical Overthinking: Notes on Modern Irrationality (2024).

== Life and career ==
Montell was born and raised in Baltimore, Maryland, United States, to a Jewish family; she attended Hebrew school as a child. Montell studied linguistics at New York University and her writing has appeared in Time, Nylon, Cosmopolitan, Glamour, Domino, and Marie Claire. She previously worked as a beauty and features editor at Byrdie and Who What Wear. She also created a web series, The Dirty Word, for Joey Soloway's now defunct platform, Wifey.

Montell's debut book, Wordslut: A Feminist Guide to Taking Back the English Language, was released in 2019 and received positive reviews from critics. It was named one of the best books of May 2019 by Popsugar, Marie Claire, and Cosmopolitan.

Montell's second book, Cultish: The Language of Fanaticism, was published in 2021 and also received positive reviews from critics. The book was partially inspired by Montell's father, who spent his teen years in the cult Synanon. Montell is also a cohost of the weekly podcast Sounds Like a Cult, which examines the cult-like aspects of various groups from across the cultural zeitgeist.

Montell's third book, The Age of Magical Overthinking: Notes on Modern Irrationality, was published in April 2024. The book explains how cognitive biases warp our actions.
