= Amanda Mabro =

- Born: Montreal, Quebec, Canada
- Occupation: Singer-songwriter
- Instrument: Vocals
- Years active: 2000–present
- Website: amandamabro.com

Amanda Mabro is a Canadian singer-songwriter and vocal coach. Amanda and her band have been active since 2000. She is also one half of the alternative electro duo 30 Frames.

Amanda Mabro has performed at many events including at Festival International de Jazz de Montreal in 2008. She and her band performed several concerts including at the Cabaret Juste Pour Rire in Montreal, and in Brussels, Belgium at the "La Monnaie" Opera House. In 2010, she performed at the Osheaga Music and Arts Festival, and at the Montreal Jazz Festival in Montreal, Quebec, Canada.

Mabro's video, "Nuit Blanche" has garnered Canada-wide airplay on MuchMusic in Canada. She also produced "The WAWA Show" (We Are Women Artists) in Montreal since 2003.

== Discography ==
=== Albums ===
- Superwoman in the Making (2006)
- Red Rows (2008)
- Wine Flows (2008)
- Die to the Past (2011)
- Easy Enough (2014)
- 30 Frames by 30 Frames (2015)

=== Videos ===
- "Nuit Blanche" (2009)
