= Social Work Research =

- Discipline: Social work
- Language: English
- Edited by: James Herbert Williams

Publication details
- Former name(s): Social Work Research and Abstracts
- History: 1977–present
- Publisher: Oxford University Press, NASW Press
- Frequency: Quarterly
- Impact factor: 1.211 (2016)

Standard abbreviations
- ISO 4: Soc. Work Res.

Indexing
- ISSN: 1070-5309 (print); 1545-6838 (web)
- LCCN: 94640837
- OCLC no.: 830987076

Links
- Journal homepage; Online archive

Social Work Research is a quarterly peer-reviewed academic journal covering social work. It was established in 1977 as Social Work Research and Abstracts, and in 1995, this split into two separate journals: Social Work Research and Social Work Abstracts. It is published by Oxford University Press as part of their partnership with the National Association of Social Workers through the latter's NASW Press. The editor-in-chief is James Herbert Williams (Arizona State University). According to the Journal Citation Reports, the journal has a 2016 impact factor of 1.211. Social work research is attempts to further understanding and addressing social problems. The aim of the journal is to inform social work practice, identify needs, evaluate interventions, and promote social justice.
