= Amanda Browder =

American installation artist (born 1976)

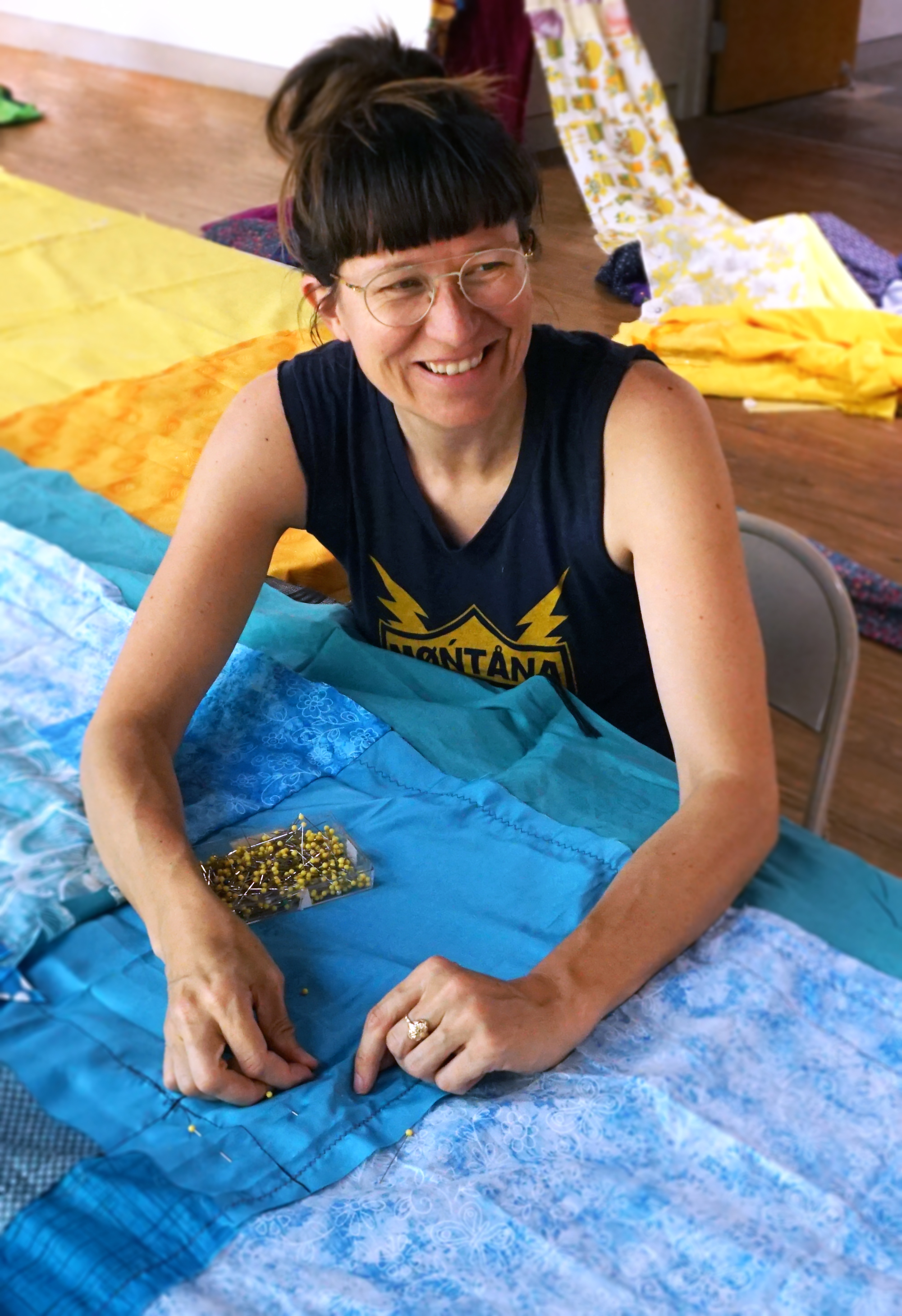
- Amanda Browder, 2019
- Born: Missoula, Montana
- Education: University of Wisconsin-Madison
- Known for: installation art
- Website: amandabrowder.com

Amanda Browder (born 1976 in Missoula, MT) is an American installation artist known for her large-scale fabric installations on building exteriors and other public sites. Her work incorporates donated materials and local volunteers, creating site-specific art. She is the recipient of grants from the National Endowment for the Arts, and Transformation Fellowship from the University of Nevada, Las Vegas (UNLV).

== Biography ==
Browder was raised in Montana. She began sewing when she was in third grade, starting her interest in fabric. Browder received an MFA/MA from the University of Wisconsin-Madison and has taught at the School of the Art Institute of Chicago. She is based in Brooklyn, New York.

== Career ==
Browder produces large-scale fabric installations for building exteriors and other public sites. Browder was part of the show, "Hubris," at the Hyde Park Art Center in 2004. In 2005, she, Duncan MacKenzie and Richard Holland founded the "Bad at Sports" podcast which covers local arts scenes. Browder has collaborated with Chief Curator of the Art Gallery of Mississauga Stuart Keeler on several projects between 2006 and 2008 as the collective known as Career Day.

In 2010, Browder gave a presentation at the Winkelman Gallery in Chelsea for the "#class" exhibition. Also in 2010, she worked on a collaborative public art piece with the North Brooklyn Public Art Coalition. The project was called "Future Phenomenon" and encouraged Brooklyn residents to work together on a large-scale sewing project.

Browder exhibited one work at the 2012 Arts@Renaissance event in Greenpoint, Brooklyn; one work at the 2012 Dumbo Arts Festival in Brooklyn; one work at the New Museum's Ideas City Festival; and a project at the 2013 FAB Fest in New York City. Browder participated in the annual Bushwick Open Studios event in 2013. Browder also showed one work at a Kickstarter party in Greenpoint, Brooklyn celebrating the 2014 opening of a new company building.

Browder has also exhibited at the University of Alabama at Birmingham AAHD, Birmingham, AL; Nuit Blanche Public Art Festival/LEITMOTIF in Toronto; Mobinale, Prague; Allegra LaViola Gallery, NYC; Nakaochiai Gallery, Tokyo; White Columns, NYC; No Longer Empty, Brooklyn. Browder's first large-scale computer-generated digital patterning debut was her project 'At Night We Light Up for the Indianapolis Power & Light Building, unveiled on June 30, 2016, and shown August 26 and 27 as part of a free interactive light festival hosted by the Central Indiana Community Foundation.

In 2016, she received her first National Endowment for the Arts grant to work with the Albright Knox Museum to cover the Buffalo Public Library. In 2016, she sheathed three historic buildings in Buffalo using hundreds of yards of donated fabric. The three buildings include 950 Broadway, the former Richmond Methodist Episcopal Church at Richmond Avenue and West Ferry Street and Albright-Knox's Clifton Hall. The pieces were created from fabric collected and donated from all over the Buffalo area, sewn together by a collection of community volunteers.

In April 2019 Browder installed "The Land of Hidden Gems" as the inaugural UNLV Transformation Fellow. In June 2019 Browder installed "City of Threads" at the Arlington Arts Center in Arlington, Virginia. In September 2019 she installed "Kaleidoscopic" in ArtPrize's "Project 1" in Grand Rapids, Michigan. It included draping a community center building, and covering four sky walks located in downtown Grand Rapids.

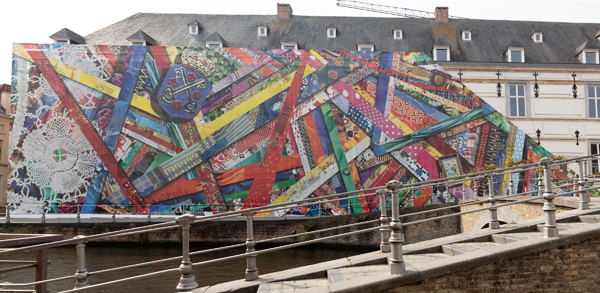
Work by Browder in Bruges

In 2021 Browder was invited to participate in the Bruges Triennial in Bruges, Belgium. Her entry Happy Coincidences consists of three temporary and one permanent installation throughout the city. One installation is a large canvas digital print on architectural mesh hanging along the Verversdijk.
