= Amanda Houston =

British weather presenter

Amanda Houston (born 8 April 1980) is a British weather presenter and DJ, working for ITV Weather.

== Career ==
Houston is originally from Barrow-in-Furness Cumbria; however at 19 she moved to Newcastle upon Tyne, where she became an editorial assistant for the Evening Chronicle and a freelance journalist for Metro Newspaper. She also worked as a DJ and radio presenter.

In August 2008, she became the main weather presenter for ITV Anglia. In October 2013, she moved to London and began covering weather forecasts for various ITV plc regions in England, Wales and the Channel Islands. Since April 2014, she has been presenting national ITV Weather forecasts.

Houston is also a yoga and mindfulness teacher. She has two step sons, born 1999 and 2001.

== Filmography ==
- ITV Anglia – Lead Weather Forecaster (2010-Present)
- ITV Weather – Regional Weather Presenter (2013–Present)
- ITV Weather – National Weather Presenter (2014–Present)
