= Amanda Alcantara =

Dominican-American writer and activist

Amanda Alcántara
- Born: New York City, U.S.
- Education: Manhattan College (BA)
- Occupation: Politician
- Office: Member of the New York State Assembly
- Predecessor: José Rivera
- Successor: George Alvarez
- Political party: Democratic

Amanda Alcantara is a Dominican-American writer and activist. She is the co-founder of La Galeria, a magazine focused on Dominican women, and the author of the blog Radical Latina. A graduate of Rutgers University, she has written for NY1 and El Diario, and Feministing.

Alcantara was employed at New York University's McSilver Institute for Poverty Policy and Research, leaving in August 2017.
