= Amanda Morris =

American chemist and academic

- Education: Johns Hopkins University; Pennsylvania State University
- Scientific career
- Workplaces: Virginia Tech; Princeton University

Amanda Morris is an American chemist who is the Patricia Caldwell Faculty Fellow and professor of inorganic and energy chemistry at Virginia Tech. Her research considers next-generation materials for catalysis and light-harvesting. She was elected chair of the American Chemical Society Gay and Transgender Chemists and Allies committee in 2021.

== Early life and education ==
Morris was an undergraduate at Pennsylvania State University. She moved to Johns Hopkins University for doctoral research, where she worked alongside Gerald Meyer. In 2009, Morris joined Princeton University and the laboratory of Andrew B. Bocarsly.

== Research and career ==
Morris makes use of photo-electrochemistry to understand new materials for renewable energy. She has created photosynthetic systems for solar harvesting. Morris has proposed metal–organic frameworks as light harvesters and high surface-area catalysts. Metal organic frameworks are stable solid state organic-inorganic hybrid materials. The high surface areas mean that they can improve their catalytic activity. Her early research looked to understand how to control the optical and electronic properties of metal organic frameworks. She studied how electrons were transported through metal organic frameworks, and how to design MOFs that showed efficient photo-induced charge transport.

Morris served as co-chair of the Virginia Tech LGBT Staff Caucus, where she led efforts to expand the university's non-discrimination clause to protect people from gender minorities. She also led efforts to install gender inclusive restrooms and use preferred names on university records. Morris was the first academic advisor of oSTEM at Virginia Tech. She was elected chair of the American Chemical Society Gay and Transgender Chemists and Allies (GTCA) committee in 2021. She was made head of the department of chemistry in 2022. Beyond her own research, she uses her laboratory to enhance the curriculum of the Roanoke City Public Schools.

== Awards and honors ==
- Jimmy W. Viers Teaching Award
- Patricia Caldwell Faculty Fellow
- Kavli Frontiers of Science Fellow
- Inter-American Photochemical Society Young Investigator Award
- John C. Schug Research Award
- Dreyfus Teacher-Scholar Award
- Alfred P. Sloan Research Fellow
- NSF CAREER Award Recipient
- Presidential Principles of Community Award
- College of Science Diversity Award
- Ralph E. Powe Junior Faculty Enhancement Award

== Selected publications ==
- Morris, Amanda; Gerald J Meyer; Fujita, Etsuko (2009). "Molecular approaches to the photocatalytic reduction of carbon dioxide for solar fuels". Accounts of Chemical Research. 42 (12): 1983–1994. doi:10.1021/ar9001679. PMID 19928829. Wikidata Q33516369.
- Spencer R Ahrenholtz; Charity C Epley; Morris, Amanda (2014). "Solvothermal preparation of an electrocatalytic metalloporphyrin MOF thin film and its redox hopping charge-transfer mechanism". Journal of the American Chemical Society. 136 (6): 2464–2472. doi:10.1021/ja410684q. PMID 24437480. Wikidata Q44992883.
- Jie Zhu; Pavel M Usov; Wenqian Xu; et al. (2018). "A New Class of Metal-Cyclam-Based Zirconium Metal-Organic Frameworks for CO2 Adsorption and Chemical Fixation". Journal of the American Chemical Society. 140 (3): 993–1003. doi:10.1021/jacs.7b10643. PMID 29268601. Wikidata Q48363681.
