= Amanda Bayer =

American economist

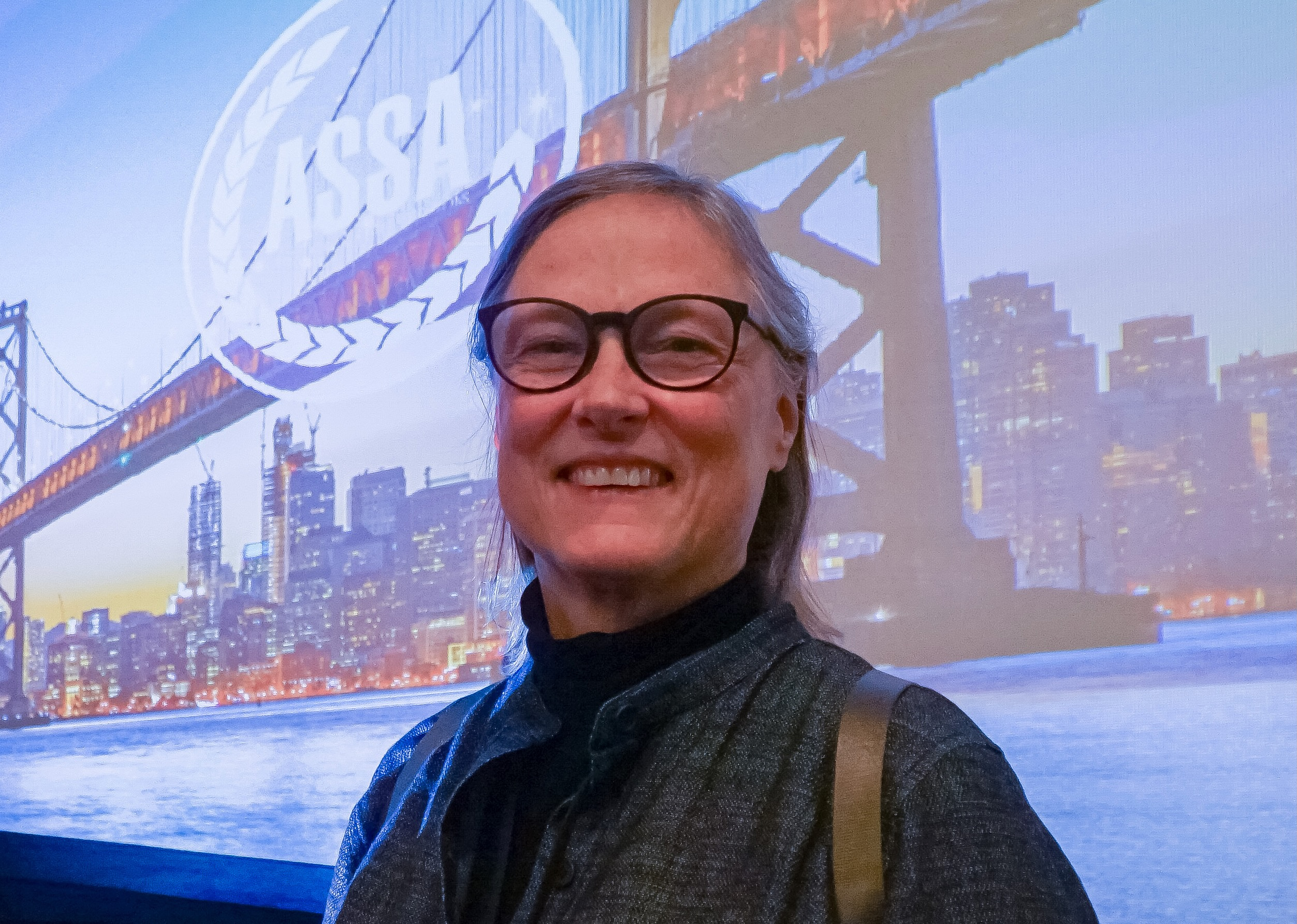
- Education: Yale University, MPhil, PhD; Williams College, MA, BA
- Scientific career
- Fields: Economics
- Workplaces: Swarthmore College
- Doctoral advisor: James Heckman; David George Pearce; Joseph Tracy
- Website: Official website

Amanda Bayer is an American economist who is the Franklin and Betty Barr professor of economics at Swarthmore College, known for her work fostering innovation in economic education and research. She was elected to the executive committee of the American Economic Association in 2021.

== Career ==
Bayer has been a member of the faculty at Swarthmore College since 1992. She has also served at the Board of Governors of the Federal Reserve System, first as a research economist and later as a visiting senior adviser. She has worked to create resources for economists to be more inclusive in their practices, and has conducted and published research on the effectiveness of these resources. Her work has been covered by major media publications.

=== Selected works ===
- Bayer, Amanda, and Cecilia Elena Rouse. "Diversity in the economics profession: A new attack on an old problem." Journal of Economic Perspectives 30, no. 4 (2016): 221–42.
- Bayer, Amanda, Jean Baldwin Grossman, and David L. DuBois. "Using volunteer mentors to improve the academic outcomes of underserved students: The role of relationships." Journal of Community Psychology 43, no. 4 (2015): 408–429.
- Bayer, Amanda, Syon P. Bhanot, and Fernando Lozano. "Does simple information provision lead to more diverse classrooms? Evidence from a field experiment on undergraduate economics." AEA Papers and Proceedings, vol. 109, pp. 110–14. 2019.
- Bayer, Amanda, Gary A. Hoover, and Ebonya Washington. "How You Can Work to Increase the Presence and Improve the Experience of Black, Latinx, and Native American People in the Economics Profession." Journal of Economic Perspectives 34, no. 3 (2020): 193–219.
- Bayer, Amanda, and David W. Wilcox. "The unequal distribution of economic education: A report on the race, ethnicity, and gender of economics majors at US colleges and universities." The Journal of Economic Education 50, no. 3 (2019): 299–320.
- Bayer, Amanda, Gregory Bruich, Raj Chetty, and Andrew Housiaux. "Expanding and diversifying the pool of undergraduates who study economics: Insights from a new introductory course at Harvard." The Journal of Economic Education 51, no. 3-4 (2020): 364–379.
