= Amanda Ferguson =

British fencer

Personal information
- Born: 19 February 1967 (age 59) Droylsden, Lancashire, England

Sport
- Sport: Fencing

Amanda Ferguson (born 19 February 1967) is a British fencer. She competed in the women's team foil event at the 1992 Summer Olympics.
