= Amanda Sussman =

Canadian author, speaker (born 1972)

- Born: 1972 (age 53–54)
- Education: McGill University; Johns Hopkins University School of Advanced International Studies
- Occupations: Author, speaker, and strategist
- Known for: Plan Canada's head of policy
- Children: 3

Amanda Sussman (born 1972) is a Canadian author, speaker, and strategist. She is the author of the 2007 book The Art of The Possible: A Handbook for Political Activism. Sussman resides in Toronto with her husband Brian Current and three children. She is known for her work as Plan Canada's head of policy and advocacy.

== Early life and education ==
Sussman was raised in the Ashkenazi Jewish community in Toronto, Canada and is the second of four children. In 1995, she received a Bachelor of Arts, Joint Honors in Anthropology and Political Science, with a concentration in International Development from McGill University in Montreal, Quebec. In 1998, Sussman received a Master of Arts in International Relations and International Economics from Johns Hopkins University School of Advanced International Studies (SAIS) in Washington D.C., with a double major in Canadian and Latin American studies.

== Career ==
From 1996 to 1999, Sussman worked in human rights advocacy with organizations including Human Rights Watch, Amnesty International and the United Nations High Commission for Refugees. From 1999 to 2004, she was senior advisor on human rights issues to federal Cabinet Ministers in the Canadian government, including Canada's Minister of Citizenship and Immigration, Elinor Caplan and the Minister of Foreign Affairs, Bill Graham (Canadian Politician).

After leaving government in 2006, Sussman wrote the book The Art of the Possible: A Handbook for Political Activism, in which she outlined the methods that she uses as a political strategist. The book was published in Toronto by McClelland & Stewart. In 2010, she gave a TEDx Talk in Toronto, expanding on the same subject.

Also in 2010, Sussman was part of a team that implemented the Muskoka Initiative, led by Canadian Prime Minister Stephen Harper, which globally leveraged $7.5 billion to address the top five causes of maternal and child mortality in the developing world.

In 2011, Sussman took part in the successful effort to create an International Day of the Girl and played a role in Canada's first national strategy to prevent and respond to gender-based violence. She helped organize Plan International's global initiative for girls' rights known as "Because I am a Girl".

At the 44th G7 Summit in 2018, Sussman was the strategist behind the $3.8B investment to girls’ education in humanitarian settings led by the Prime Minister of Canada Justin Trudeau. The funds are intended to provide education for 8.7 million children caught in world conflicts.
