= Amanda Hickey =

American surgeon

Amanda Sanford Hickey
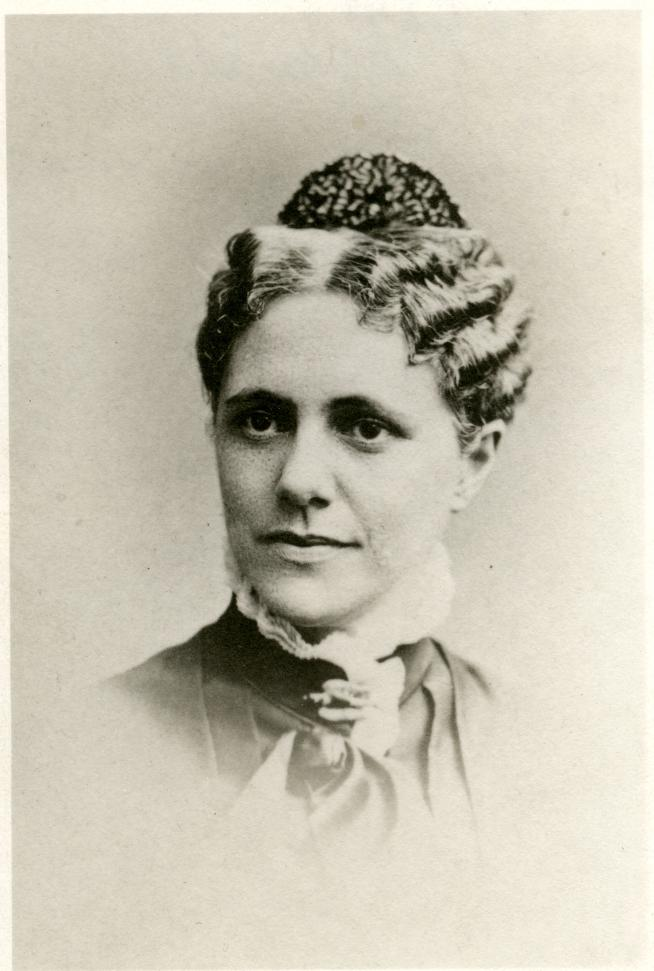
- Born: Amanda Sanford; 28 August 1838; Rhode Island
- Died: 17 October 1894 (aged 56)
- Education: Woman's Medical College of Pennsylvania (M.D.); University of Michigan
- Spouse: Patrick Hickey
- Scientific career
- Fields: Surgery, Obstetrics
- Workplaces: Auburn City Hospital

Amanda Sanford Hickey (28 August 1838 – 17 October 1894) was an American surgeon, obstetrician, and physician who practiced medicine in Auburn, New York. She was the first woman to earn a Doctor of Medicine from the University of Michigan Medical School.

== Early life and education ==
Amanda Sanford Hickey was born into a Quaker family on 28 August 1838 in Rhode Island. After the death of her father, she moved with her mother to Scipioville in Cayuga County, New York, and attended the Friends' Academy in Union Springs, New York.

After graduating from the Friends' Academy, Hickey spent a year studying Greek and earning money from the cultivation of a vegetable garden. She then began working as a teacher at the Hawland School in Union Springs, while studying medicine on her own.

In 1868 or 1869, Hickey enrolled in the Woman's Medical College of Pennsylvania in Philadelphia, where she studied for one year, after encouragement from Emily Howland. She interned at the New England Hospital for Women and Children in Boston, where she studied obstetrics under the instruction of Lucy Ellen Sewall and Marie Elizabeth Zakrzewska. Her colleagues at the hospital included Emma Louise Call and Eliza Mosher. By 1870, Hickey was already working as a midwife there.

In 1872, Hickey graduated with the highest honors from the University of Michigan Medical School, becoming the first female graduate of the institution. Hickey was able to graduate in two years because she had already accumulated credits before she entered the university. Hickey wrote her doctoral thesis on puerperal eclampsia. In his graduation speech, Henry F. Lyster honored Hickey by saying, "It is my pleasing duty to welcome to the profession a woman coming from these halls." Some male students reportedly fired spitballs at Hickey as she received her diploma.

== Career ==
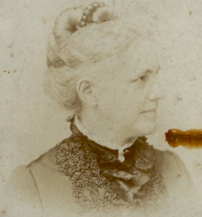
Portrait of Amanda Sanford Hickey

After earning her medical degree, Hickey opened a private medical practice in Auburn, New York. She was the first woman to open a medical practice in Auburn. In 1879, she travelled to London with her friend, fellow physician Eliza Mosher, to observe the medical practices and facilities there. In London, Hickey and Sewall learned of new practices such as listerism and laparotomies. The pair then travelled to Paris at the suggestion of Elizabeth Blackwell, where they continued to observe European medical practices.

Upon her return to the United States in 1880, Hickey became a founding staff member of Auburn City Hospital, now Auburn Community Hospital, and remained on the hospital staff until her death. She established the Maternity Cottage, a dedicated maternity ward at the hospital, which was later named in her honor. She also had "a reputation as an outstanding surgeon, performing intra-abdominal surgery with above-average success."

Hickey was a member of the Medical Society of New York and served as president of the Cayuga County Medical Society. A supporter of women's rights and universal suffrage, she was a founding member of the Cayuga County Political Equality Club.

She married Patrick Hickey, a widower with children, in 1884, and continued to practice medicine.

== Death and legacy ==
Hickey died of pneumonia on October 17, 1894. According to her obituary in Medical Record, she contracted the disease "it is supposed, by chill after assisting at a tedious abdominal operation in an overheated room."

Sanford House of Bursley Hall at the University of Michigan is named for Hickey. As of July 2023, Dr. Lona Moody was Amanda Sanford Hickey Professor of Internal Medicine at the University of Michigan.
