= Amanda Banton =

Australian lawyer

Amanda Kim Banton (born 26 July 1970) is an Australian class actions lawyer, best known for filing class actions against ratings agencies Standard & Poor's and Fitch Ratings.

== Life and career ==
Banton studied law and commerce at the University of Adelaide, graduating in 2002. During her studies, she worked for the Commonwealth Government and at KPMG Consulting in the Public Sector Consulting Group. Banton commenced her legal career at Piper Alderman in 2002, and was appointed Partner in its Dispute Resolution Group in 2007. In 2015 Banton joined Squire Patton Boggs.

Between 2014 and 2016, Banton filed several class actions against Standard & Poor's alleging misleading and deceptive conduct and negligence, which settled in May 2018 for $215 million. In 2014 Banton filed a class action lawsuit against ratings firm Fitch Ratings alleging misleading and deceptive conduct and negligence in giving AAA and AA ratings to certain collateralized debt obligations. Fitch settled pre-trial in September 2019 for AU$27 million, representing the recovery of about 95% of the losses incurred by the plaintiffs, and is believed to be (in percentage terms), one of the largest settlements achieved pre-trial in Australia.

In April 2019 Banton pleaded guilty to assaulting a woman at a legal industry event hosted by Banco Chambers. She received a 18-month conditional release order with no conviction recorded.

Since 2020, Banton has been the Managing Partner of Banton Group, specialising in commercial dispute resolution, class actions, restructuring and insolvency litigation and advisory matters.

In 2020, Banton represented the parents of Fatima Dyczynski in an appeal against their exclusion from the 2019 MH17 class action settlement, reached between Malaysia Airlines and Australian families of MH17 Malaysian Airlines crash victims.

=== Awards ===
- 2021 Law Firm Leader of the Year – Australasian Law Awards
- 2019 Australian Dispute Resolution Partner of the Year (finalist) – Lawyers Weekly
- 2018 Australian Dispute Resolution Team of the Year (finalist) – Lawyers Weekly
- 2016 Australian Insolvency Partner of the Year (winner)– Lawyers Weekly
- 2014 Hot 40 Private Practice Lawyer - Australasian Lawyer
- 2013 Australian Dispute Star for Restructuring and Insolvency - Euromoney's Benchmark, Asia Pacific
