= Amanda Broderick =

British marketing academic

Amanda Jayne Broderick
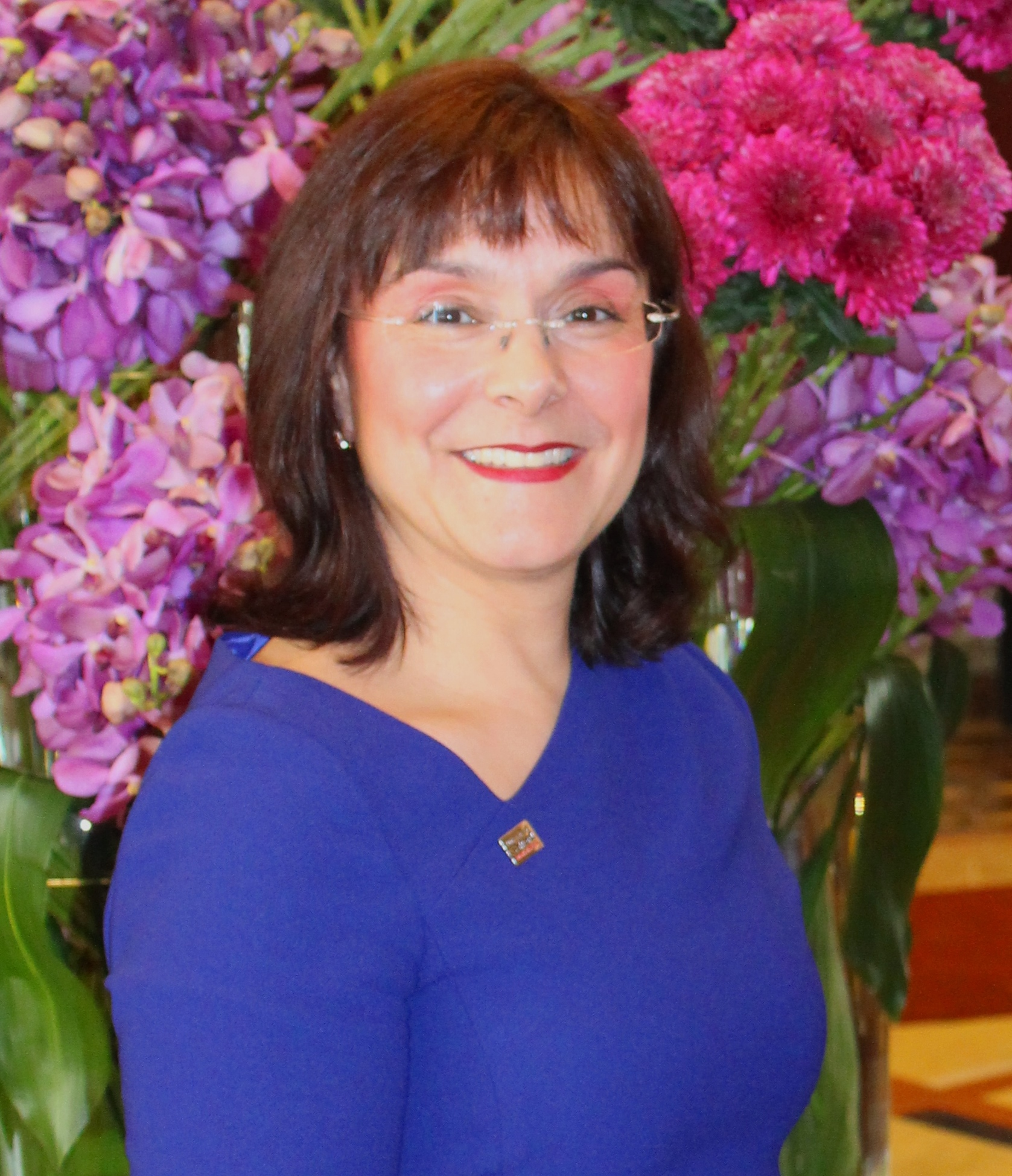
- Born: 1971 (age 54–55); Staffordshire, England.
- Education: De Montfort University in Leicester, UK (B.A., Ph.D.)
- Occupations: British marketer, academic and academic

Amanda Jayne Broderick (born 1971) is a British marketer, academic and academic administrator who has been the vice-chancellor and president of the University of East London since September 2018. She is also professor of international business.

== Biography ==
With family origins in Afghanistan, Belgium, Ireland and Hull, Broderick was born in 1971 and brought up in Staffordshire, England. She graduated from De Montfort University in Leicester, UK with a 1st Class Bachelor of Arts (BA) degree in marketing and psychology and a Doctor of Philosophy (PhD) degree in international business.

== Career ==
She previously lectured at the University of Newcastle, the University of Salford, Durham University, Coventry University, Aston University and De Montfort University. Before moving to Newcastle University, she was pro-vice chancellor (International Priorities) and founding executive dean of the College of Business & Law, University of Salford; principal of St. Cuthbert's Society (a college of Durham University) and deputy dean of Durham Business School. She also led the development of the University Academy 92, founded by the Class of ’92 and Lancaster University and launched in September 2017.

== Research ==
Broderick's expertise lies in the fields of international business, marketing psychology and strategic communications. She has authored two seminal texts in her field and has a track record in research and enterprise funding.. Since joining UEL, she has also been an advocate for the University's research in areas including early years development.

== Professional service ==
During her tenure as dean at Salford, it was the 2014 Times Higher Education Business School of the Year.. At UEL, she has used this previous experience to oversee a significant expansion in the University's provision for student entrepreneurs, which ranked 2nd in the UK for annual student start-ups in 2024..

In 2019, she was elected as UK representative on the Association of Commonwealth Universities (ACU) Council, and in February 2024 as Chair of British Universities and Colleges Sport (BUCS).

She is a frequent contributor to higher education publications including Wonkhe, the Higher Education Policy Institute, and Times Higher Education, as well as writing for other outlets on issues such as economic growth.
