= Amanda Matta =

American journalist, television and radio commentator

- Born: Amanda Louise Matta; January 30, 1995 (age 31)
- Education: Juniata College (BA); Drexel University (MS)
- Years active: 2021–present
- Known for: Media reporter for the British royal family
- Parent(s): Martin Timothy Matta; Jennifer Louise Bretz

Instagram information
- Page: Amanda Matta
- Years active: 2012-present
- Followers: 119,000

Substack information
- Newsletter: The Fascinator
- Notes: @mattaoffact
- Topic: Commentary
- Subscribers: 7.7 thousand

TikTok information
- Page: Matta_Of_Fact
- Followers: 1.5 million
- Last updated: March 12, 2026
- Website: Official site

Amanda Louise Matta (born January 30, 1995) is an American television and social media commentator on the British royal family. She has been quoted by the BBC.

== Early life and education ==
Amanda Louise Matta was born on January 30, 1995, to Martin Timothy Matta and Jennifer Louise Matta (née Bretz). Martin died in 1996 at the age of 23-years old. Jennifer remarried in 1998 to Alphonse C. Miller, and Amanda served as their flower girl.

Matta graduated from Elizabethtown Area High School in 2013 and attended Juniata College. She graduated from Juniata College with a degree in Art History, and Drexel University in Museum Leadership.

== Career ==
Matta began posting on TikTok in 2021 and her videos became popular. "It was a complete accident but my views and follower count grew almost immediately," Matta said. "My first video got almost three million views, and then I jumped to 10,000 followers and it continued to grow from there."

In August 2021, with the discussion of Princess Michael of Kent using her husband's name, news articles began citing Matta's commentary. In February 2022, Business Insider ran an article going over one of Matta's TikTok videos corroborating each point with addition resources. Later that May, The Guardian included Matta in an article about royal TikTokers.

After Queen Elizabeth II died in September 2022, Matta was quoted by BBC.

On May 12, 2023, Matta sat down with Bridgerton author Julia Quinn at a paid event, to discuss Quinn's newest novel which detailed the relationship and romance between Queen Charlotte and King George III. In September, Matta highlighted in a video the double standard between Meghan, Duchess of Sussex and Catherine, Princess of Wales in the media.

When King Charles III visited Canada in May 2025, Matta was consulted by BBC during their live coverage of the speech to highlight Charles' use of soft power in his dressing.

=== Podcasts ===
Podcast	Year	Genre	Host(s) or Starring	Produced by	Ref
Art of History	2021–present	Interview, history and commentary	Amanda Matta	Independent	
Off With Their Headlines	2025–present	Interview, history and commentary	Amanda Matta & Meredith Constant	Independent	
Reign Check	2026-present	Interview, commentary	Amanda Matta & Michael Panter	Independent	
