= Asymptote (magazine) =

Literary magazine for translations of world literature

- Website type: Online literary magazine
- Available in: English
- Creator: Lee Yew Leong
- Editor: Lee Yew Leong
- Website: www.asymptotejournal.com
- Launched: 2011; 15 years ago

Asymptote is a print and online literary magazine dedicated to translations of world literature, including poetry, fiction, nonfiction, and drama, mostly to English, but also to other languages. Reviews, interviews, blogs, visual arts and audiovisual materials are also found on the website; issues are released four times a year. As of July, 2018, Asymptote had published work translated from 100 language by writers from 117 different countries. Writers such as Mary Gaitskill, Jose Saramago, J. M. Coetzee, Junot Díaz, Yann Martel, and Mo Yan have appeared in the magazine.

The magazine was established in 2011 by the Taipei-based Singaporean writer Lee Yew Leong, who is the editor-in-chief. Lee said in 2011, "We operate differently from other translation journals in that we don't just sit back and wait for translations to come to us. We actually identify the good work from writers [that haven't yet been introduced to the English-speaking world] and actively seek out translators to help to translate the work for us."

In 2016, Asymptote celebrated its fifth anniversary with public events held in New York, London, Ottawa, and Chicago.

== Awards ==
In 2015, the magazine received the International Literary Translation Initiative Award, one of a dozen awards given yearly by the London Book Fair.

== Asymptote (1950) ==
Asymptote - an earlier, but fictional, avant garde literary magazine - features in the A. A. Milne short story A Rattling Good Yarn, published in 1950 in his collection A Table Near the Band. The story is summed up on the dust wrapper as "a hilarious spoof about an extremely popular writer and an avant garde literary critic." Asymptote is the "advanced literary monthly" wherein the two protagonists do battle.
