= Amanda Montejano =

Mexican mathematician

Amanda Montejano Cantoral is a Mexican mathematician specializing in combinatorics, and particularly in the application of graph coloring to geometric graphs. She is a professor at the Juriquilla campus of the National Autonomous University of Mexico, in the Multidisciplinary Unit of Teaching and Research of the Faculty of Sciences.

== Education and career ==
Montejano graduated from the National Autonomous University of Mexico in 2004, and earned a doctorate in applied mathematics at the Polytechnic University of Catalonia in Spain in 2009. Her doctoral dissertation, Colored combinatorial structures: homomorphisms and counting, was supervised by Oriol Serra Albó.

She was a postdoctoral researcher at the National Autonomous University of Mexico, in the Center for Applied Physics and Advanced Technology, before taking her present position in the Multidisciplinary Unit of Teaching and Research.

== Recognition ==
Montejano is a member of the Mexican Academy of Sciences.
