= Amanda Cottreau =

Canadian singer-songwriter

- Born: Yarmouth, Nova Scotia
- Genres: Folk, Traditional
- Occupation: Singer-songwriter
- Years active: 1998–present

Amanda Cottreau is a Canadian folk singer-songwriter based in Ottawa, Ontario. She is a member of Songwriters Association of Canada, and made it to round 2 of CBC searchlight contest 2015 with Lady Lover and featured vocalist on a second song, Little Bird.

== Career ==
Cottreau begun her musical career as a lead background vocals in a worship band from 1998-2003 which was based in Kingston, Ontario. Later, she worked with Ryan Potter, an Ottawa-based musician and producer. In November 2010, she released her first solo album Universe in a Soft Shell. In 2012, one of the tracks Couldn't Wait from the album Universe in a Soft Shell was featured on TV series Degrassi: The Next Generation.

Cottreau has performed over a hundred shows between Ontario, Quebec and Nova Scotia along with Lucila Al Mar, JustJamaal & Raymundo Pizana.

== Discography ==
Year	Album	Genre	Credit	No. of songs
2010	Universe In A Soft Shell	Folk	Solo	5
2011	Around 11	Folk	Various artists	12
2010	In the Stairwell	Folk	Solo/Single	1
2015	Lady Lover	Folk	Solo/Single	1
2016	SEA & SKY	Folk	Solo/Single	1
