= Amandine Aftalion =

French applied mathematician

Amandine Aftalion (born 1973) is a French applied mathematician, known for her research on Bose–Einstein condensates and on the mathematics of footracing. She is a director of research at the Centre national de la recherche scientifique (CNRS).

== Education and career ==
Aftalion studied at the École normale supérieure (Paris) from 1992 to 1996, earning her agrégation in mathematics in 1994 and Master of Advanced Studies in numerical analysis in 1995. She defended her doctoral dissertation, Quelques problèmes d'équations aux dérivées partielles elliptiques non linéaires et applications à des modèles en supraconductivité et en combustion, in 1997 at Pierre and Marie Curie University, under the direction of Henri Berestycki. In 2002 she earned a habilitation with the thesis Equations aux dérivées partielles elliptiques non linéaires : propriétés qualitatives et modèles en physique des basses températures.

She has been a researcher with CNRS since 1999, and was promoted to director of research in 2008. Since 2010 her position with CNRS has been associated with Versailles Saint-Quentin-en-Yvelines University.

== Contributions ==
Aftalion is the author of the book Vortices in Bose–Einstein Condensates (Birkhäuser, 2006). The book studies quantum vortex and superfluid behavior in Bose–Einstein condensates, using the Gross–Pitaevskii equation to model the energy in these systems.

In her research on the mathematics of sports, Aftalion uses differential equations to model both the motion and forces on a runner, and the aerobic and anaerobic fitness of the runner as a race progresses. She has used the theory of optimal control to show that long-distance runners can achieve greater endurance by small variations in speed, contradicting earlier research by Joseph Keller suggesting that runners should keep their speed nearly constant throughout a race. In follow-on work, she showed that, although long-distance runners should speed up in the final sprint of a race, the optimal strategy for a short footrace involves slowing down towards the end of the race.
