= NKo (Unicode block) =

Unicode block containing characters for the Manding languages of West Africa

- Range: U+07C0..U+07FF (64 code points)
- Plane: BMP
- Scripts: N'Ko
- Major alphabets: Manden
- Assigned: 62 code points
- Unused: 2 reserved code points

Unicode version history
- 5.0 (2006): 59 (+59)
- 11.0 (2018): 62 (+3)

Unicode documentation
- Code chart ∣ Web page

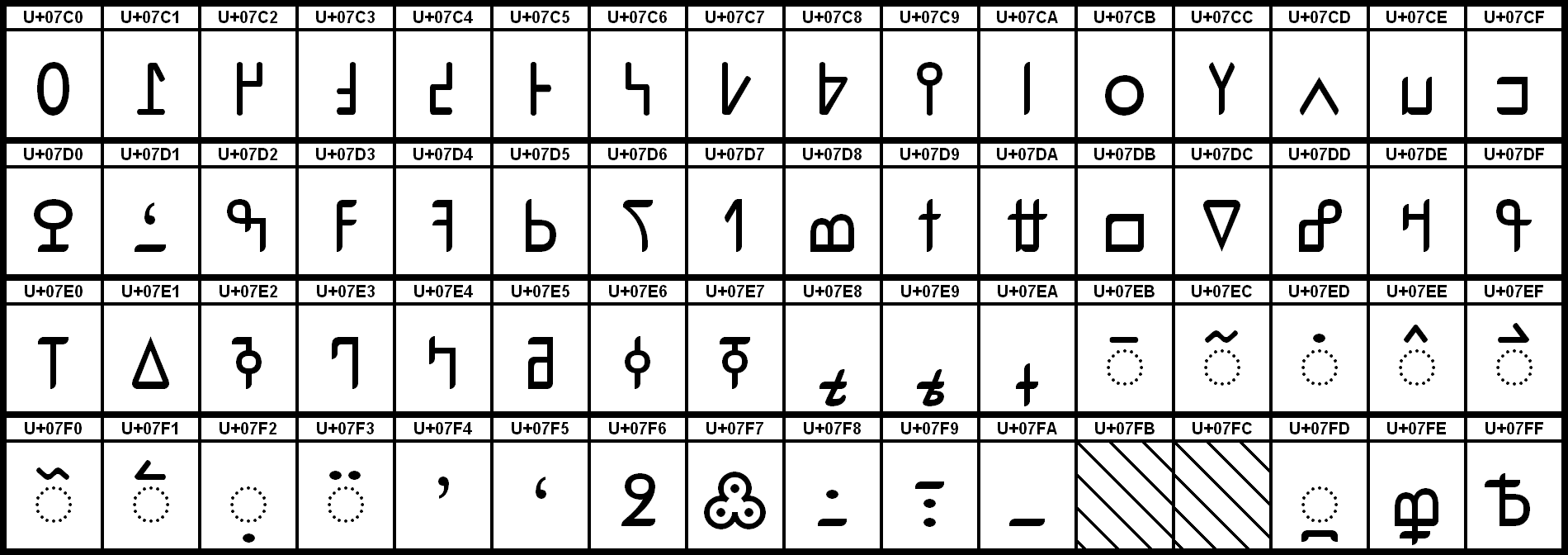
Graphical representation of the NKo Unicode block

NKo is a Unicode block containing characters for the Manding languages of West Africa, including Bamanan, Jula, Maninka, Mandinka, and a common literary language, Kangbe, also called NKo.

NKo became part of Unicode with version 5.0 in July 2006. With Unicode 11.0 in June 2018, three additional characters were added: a combining mark for abbreviated units of measure and two currency symbols.

NKo^{[1]}^{[2]} Official Unicode Consortium code chart (PDF)
	0	1	2	3	4	5	6	7	8	9	A	B	C	D	E	F
U+07Cx	߀	߁	߂	߃	߄	߅	߆	߇	߈	߉	ߊ	ߋ	ߌ	ߍ	ߎ	ߏ
U+07Dx	ߐ	ߑ	ߒ	ߓ	ߔ	ߕ	ߖ	ߗ	ߘ	ߙ	ߚ	ߛ	ߜ	ߝ	ߞ	ߟ
U+07Ex	ߠ	ߡ	ߢ	ߣ	ߤ	ߥ	ߦ	ߧ	ߨ	ߩ	ߪ	߫	߬	߭	߮	߯
U+07Fx	߰	߱	߲	߳	ߴ	ߵ	߶	߷	߸	߹	ߺ			߽	߾	߿
Notes: 1. As of Unicode version 16.0; 2. Grey areas indicate non-assigned code points

The punctuation marks ⟨⸜⟩ and ⟨⸝⟩ were placed in the Supplemental Punctuation block.

== History ==
The following Unicode-related documents record the purpose and process of defining specific characters in the NKo block:

Version	Final code points (Note: Proposed code points and characters names may differ from final code points and names)	Count	L2 ID	WG2 ID	Document
5.0	U+07C0..07FA	59	L2/03-265		Anderson, Deborah (2003-08-17), Letters in support of encoding N'Ko
5.0	U+07C0..07FA	59	L2/03-414		Three letters in support of N'ko encoding, 2003-11-01
5.0	U+07C0..07FA	59	L2/04-172	N2765	Everson, Michael; Doumbouya, Mamady; Diané, Baba Mamadi; Jammeh, Karamo Kaba (2004-06-08), Proposal to add the N'Ko script to the BMP of the UCS
5.0	U+07C0..07FA	59	L2/04-283	N2833	Everson, Michael (2004-06-23), Revisions to the N'Ko script for the PDAM code chart
5.0	U+07C0..07FA	59	L2/05-006	N2898	Doumbouya, Mamady (2005-01-11), Re: N'Ko Proposal in Amendment 2
5.0	U+07C0..07FA	59	L2/05-010		Yergeau, François; Andries, Patrick (2005-01-20), Re: N'Ko Proposal in Amendment 2
5.0	U+07C0..07FA	59	L2/05-017	N2914	Doumbouya, Mamady (2005-01-21), Documents showing old and new N'Ko letters
5.0	U+07C0..07FA	59		N2932 (htm, doc)	Doumbouya, Mamady (2005-03-12), Encoding of N'Ko in ISO/IEC 10646
5.0	U+07C0..07FA	59	L2/05-026		Moore, Lisa (2005-05-16), "Consensus 102-C1", UTC #102 Minutes, "Use the block and long script name "NKo" (without apostrophe) as the name for N'Ko."
5.0	U+07C0..07FA	59	L2/05-169	N2949	Yergeau, François; Andries, Patrick (2005-07-12), For a Correct Encoding of N'ko
5.0	U+07C0..07FA	59	L2/05-248	N2982	Yergeau, François; Andries, Patrick (2005-09-04), Comments on 2977 (Alleged parallel between 3 N'Ko Glyphs & Latin Long S)
5.0	U+07C0..07FA	59	L2/05-270		Whistler, Ken (2005-09-21), "E. N'Ko Name Changes", WG2 Consent Docket (Sophia Antipolis)
5.0	U+07C0..07FA	59	L2/05-279		Moore, Lisa (2005-11-10), "Consensus 105-C29", UTC #105 Minutes
5.0	U+07C0..07FA	59		N2953 (pdf, doc)	Umamaheswaran, V. S. (2006-02-16), "7.2.2", Unconfirmed minutes of WG 2 meeting 47, Sophia Antipolis, France; 2005-09-12/15
5.0	U+07C0..07FA	59	L2/05-237	N2977	Everson, Michael; Doumbouya, Mamady; Diané, Baba Mamadi; Jammeh, Karamo Kaba (2008-08-26), Clarification on the identity and use of three N'Ko letters
11.0	U+07FD..07FF	3	L2/15-338	N4706	Everson, Michael (2015-12-19), Proposal to encode four N'Ko characters in the BMP of the UCS
11.0	U+07FD..07FF	3	L2/16-037		Anderson, Deborah; Whistler, Ken; McGowan, Rick; Pournader, Roozbeh; Glass, Andrew; Iancu, Laurențiu (2016-01-22), "11", Recommendations to UTC #146 January 2016 on Script Proposals
11.0	U+07FD..07FF	3	L2/16-004		Moore, Lisa (2016-02-01), "C.8", UTC #146 Minutes
