= N'Ko =

N'Ko may refer to:

- N'Ko script, for writing Manding
  - NKo (Unicode block)
- N'Ko language, a stardardization of the Manding languages in West Africa
