= Jahanka language =

Manding language of Guinea Bissau and Guinea

Jahanka
- Jahanque
- Native to: Guinea-Bissau, Guinea
- Region: Boké, Gabu
- Native speakers: 150,000 (2017–2022)
- Language family: Niger–Congo: Mande; Western Mande; Manding; West Manding; Jahanka
- Writing system: Arabic script

Language codes
- ISO 639-3: jad
- Glottolog: jaha1245

Jahanka is a Manding language of Guinea-Bissau and Guinea. It is partially intelligible with Mandinka. (The Jahanka of Senegal and Guinea-Bissau is a dialect of Kassonke).
