= En Avant (album) =

Studio album by Ferdinand Richard
- Released: 1983
- Recorded: 1983
- Studio: Sunrise Studios, Kirchberg, Switzerland
- Genre: Avant-rock
- Length: 28:07
- Language: English, Vietnamese, Arabic, Polish, Dioula, Spanish, French, German
- Label: RecRec (Switzerland)
- Producer: Ferdinand Richard

Ferdinand Richard chronology
En Forme!! (1981)	En Avant (1983)

Ferdinand En Avant, Huit Chansons en Huit Langues (English: Ferdinand Forward, Eight Songs in Eight Languages), often referred to as En Avant, is the second solo album by French avant-rock bass guitarist and composer, Ferdinand Richard. It was recorded in 1983 at Sunrise Studios in Kirchberg, Switzerland, and was released on LP record by the Recommended Records affiliated Swiss independent record label, RecRec Music the same year.

En Avant consists of eight avant-rock songs sung in English, Vietnamese, Arabic, Polish, Dioula, Spanish, French and German. The music was scored for two bass guitars and a cello by Richard, who also wrote the lyrics for, and sang seven of the eight songs. The lyrics for the songs on En Avant are printed in the album liner notes in English, French and German.

In 2001 the French independent record label, Orkhêstra reissued En Avant and Richard's previous solo album, En Forme!! on a single CD.

== Background ==
Ferdinand Richard was the founding member of the French avant-rock group Etron Fou Leloublan in 1973, and was a member of a number of other musical ensembles, including Gestalt et Jive, Bruniferd and his own band, Ferdinand et les Philosophes. Richard also collaborated with English experimental guitarist Fred Frith from the English avant-rock group Henry Cow to record Dropera (1991), a "twisted rock opera".

Richard's first solo album, En Forme!! (1981) featured some of the members of Etron Fou Leloublan, which was still active at the time. On En Avant Richard explored his interest in language and culture, which developed during his studies of Medieval Literature at Grenoble in south-eastern France in the early 1970s. In the song "Victoire", sung in Arabic, Richard reflects on his childhood in Saint-Malo in north-western France. "Monsieur Blanc" (Mr. White) is a "surrealist fable" sung in the Dioula language of West Africa.

En Avant features Tom Cora from Skeleton Crew on cello, with Rick Brown from the V-Effect on drums on one of the tracks, and Christiane Cohade from Virgule 4 on bass guitar on two of the tracks. German poet and publisher Urs Engeler wrote the lyrics for, and sang the last song on the album, "Alltägliche Dinge".

== Reception ==
In the September 2002 issue of Paris Transatlantic Magazine, Dan Warburton said in a review of the Orkhêstra CD reissue of En Avant, En Forme!! that it "stand[s] out a mile" in the "predominantly insipid if not downright dull world of French pop." He added that anyone "interested in how the intricacies of prog rock fused with the raw punch of punk" should investigate this album.

Andrew Jones in his book Plunderphonics, 'pataphysics & pop mechanics: an introduction to musique actuelle praised En Avant saying that the texts "show a deft juxtaposition of culture and tongue, and a poetic heart at work."

== Track listing ==
All tracks composed by Ferdinand Richard except where noted.

Side A
No.	Title	Singer and language	Length
1.	"Contribution to Anglo American Culture"	Ferdinand Richard, English	0:41
2.	"Histoire des Meilleurs"	Richard, Vietnamese	4:29
3.	"Victoire"	Richard, Arabic	3:53
4.	"Boire en Silence"	Richard, Polish	3:29

Side B
No.	Title	Singer and language	Length
5.	"Monsieur Blanc"	Richard, Dioula	5:17
6.	"Hombre de Lodo"	Richard, Spanish	5:28
7.	"Saint Malo"	Richard, French	2:38
8.	"Alltägliche Dinge" (Ferdinand Richard, Urs Engeler)	Urs Engeler, German	2:12

== Personnel ==
- Ferdinand Richard – Fender 6-string bass, 4-string Music Master Special, vocals
- Tom Cora – cello
- Christiane Cohade – bass guitar on "Histoire des Meilleurs" and "Boire en Silence"
- Rick Brown – drums on "Boire en Silence"
- Urs Engeler – vocals on "Alltägliche Dinge"

=== Production ===
- Recorded by Michel Engeli and Robert Vogel at Sunrise Studios, Kirchberg in Switzerland
- Mixed Sunrise Studios, Kirchberg and Studio THC, Genova in Switzerland
- Produced by Ferdinand Richard
- Artwork by Peter Bäder

== Works cited ==
- Jones, Andrew (1995). "Ferdinand Richard". In Jones, Andrew (ed.). Plunderphonics, 'pataphysics & pop mechanics: an introduction to musique actuelle. SAF Publishing Ltd. pp. 41–49. ISBN 0-946719-15-2.
