= N'Ko language =

Standardized Manding koiné of West Africa

N'Ko
- ߒߞߏ
- Region: Guinea, Guinea-Bissau, Mali, West Africa
- Language family: Niger–Congo: Mande; Western Mande; Central Mande; Manding–Jogo; Manding–Vai; Manding–Mokole; Manding; N'Ko
- Writing system: NKo script

Language codes
- ISO 639-2: nqo
- ISO 639-3: nqo
- Glottolog: nkoa1234

N'Ko (Note: Sometimes spelled "N'Ko", "N'ko" or "Nko".) (ߒߞߏ) is a standardized unified koiné form of several Manding languages written in the N'Ko alphabet. It is used in Guinea, Guinea-Bissau, Mali, Ivory Coast, Burkina Faso and some other West African countries, primarily, but not exclusively, in written form, whereas in speech the different varieties of Manding are used: Maninka, Bambara, Dyula and others. While the majority of speakers of these different varieties of Manding do not use either the written or spoken form of the koiné, thousands of people across West Africa today recognize and embrace the intention behind its promulgation.

It is a literary register with a prescriptive grammar known as ߞߊ߲ߜߍ (kángbɛ, kán-gbɛ "language-clear") codified by Solomana Kante, with the màninkamóri variety, spoken in Kante's native Kankan region, serving as the mediating compromise dialect.

Valentin Vydrin in 1999 and Coleman Donaldson in 2019 indicated that the popularity of writing Manding languages in the standardized N'Ko form is growing. This standardized written form is increasingly used for literacy education among the speakers of different varieties. It is also commonly used in electronic communication.

The standard strives to represent all Manding languages in a way that attempts to show a common "proto-Manding" phonology and the words' etymology, including when the actual pronunciation in modern spoken varieties is significantly different. For example, there is at least one such convention, for representing velars between vowels: [ɡ], [k], [ɣ], [x] or zero may be pronounced, but the spelling will be the same. For example, the word for "name" in Bambara is [tɔɡɔ] and in Maninka it is [tɔɔ], but the standard written N'Ko form is ߕߐ߮ tô. In written communication each person will write it in a single unified way using the N'Ko script, and yet read and pronounce it as in their own linguistic variety.

On June 27, 2024, N'Ko was added to Google Translate.
