= Ferdinand Richard =

French musician and composer

- Born: Hervé Richard; 25 June 1950 (age 75); Meknes, Morocco
- Genres: Avant-rock
- Occupations: Musician, composer
- Instruments: Bass guitar, vocals, guitar
- Years active: 1973–1999
- Labels: Celluloid, RecRec

Hervé Richard (born 25 June 1950), better known as Ferdinand Richard, is a French avant-rock bass guitarist and composer.

Richard was a founding member of the French avant-rock group Etron Fou Leloublan in 1973, and remained with them until they broke up in 1986. He was also a member of Alfred Harth's group Gestalt et Jive in the mid-1980s, and collaborated with Fred Frith in 1989 to record Dropera (1991). Richard also formed his own group, Ferdinand et les Philosophes in 1990, and recorded two solo albums, En Forme!! (1981) and En Avant (1983).

== Biography ==
Hervé Richard-Cochet, known under the name Ferdinand Richard, was born in June 1950 in Meknes in Morocco, but spent his childhood between 1951 and 1964 in Saint-Malo in north-western France, from where his family comes. From 1969 to 1971 he studied Medieval Literature and Law at Grenoble in south-eastern France, then attended a double-bass course at the Conservatoire Régional de Musique de Grenoble. He has lived in southern France and Marseille since 1964.

== Music career ==
In 1971 Richard abandoned his studies, adopted the pseudonym "Ferdinand", and played in several local rock groups, covering Cream, Led Zeppelin, Jimi Hendrix, etc... he even tried improvisation with anarchist group Libre Cours (1971), before joining a local iconoclastic rock group called Etron Fou Leloublan in 1973, playing bass guitar, singing and composing.

Etron Fou Leloublan, French for (roughly) "Crazy Shit, the White Wolf" or "Mad Shit, the White Wolf" were a "nonconformist" avant-rock group that produced a blend of punk rock, jazz, French music hall, comedy satire and "avant-garde mayhem". Their music was a "viable [...] alternative to both French rock'n'roll and French free jazz", which had stagnated at the time. Richard played his bass guitar in ways that went beyond its traditional "metronomic role" – he used "double stops, chords, harmonics and onomatopoeic sound effects" to add melody to the group's songs. He also tuned his instrument "up a minor third" to better match his partner's alto saxophone. Later on, in the early 80's, he bought himself a rare Fender Bass VI six-string electric bass guitar from a New York pawn shop, which became his sole instrument. Richard remained with Etron Fou Leloublan until they broke up 13 years later, during which time they recorded six albums and performed hundreds of concerts in Europe, the Soviet Bloc, and North America.

While still with Etron Fou Leloublan, Richard also released two solo albums, En Forme!! and En Avant in 1981 and 1983 respectively. En Avant, subtitled Huit Chansons en Huit Langues (Eight Songs in Eight Languages), is scored by Richard for two bass guitars and a cello (played by Tom Cora), and consists of eight songs sung in English, Vietnamese, Arabic, Polish, Dioula, Spanish, French and German. On En Avant Richard explored his interest in language and culture, and wrote the lyrics for, and sang seven of the eight songs (the German song was composed and sung by Urs Engeler).

In 1984 Richard also formed a duo, Bruniferd, with saxophonist Bruno Meillier from Etron Fou Leloublan that was dedicated to "precise and condensed musical poetry". Bruniferd made three albums and toured Europe and Japan.

Near the end of Etron Fou Leloublan, Richard joined the German saxophonist Alfred Harth's multinational avant-rock group Gestalt et Jive in 1984. They performed regularly in Europe and North America for four years, during which time they made two albums, developed their "instant composition" technique, and gave their farewell concert at the 6th Festival International de Musique Actuelle de Victoriaville in Victoriaville, Quebec in Canada in October 1988.

In 1989, Berliner drummer Peter Hollinger, East German saxophonist Dietmar Diessner and Richard decided to start a power-improvisation trio, "Falaq", which never recorded but delivered several dozen performances in Europe and North America. In 1993, US drummer David Moss replaced Diessner.

In 1989, during one of the first "artists residencies" supported by Marseille Culture Department, Richard created an urban musical concept with Czech violinist Iva Bittová and Czech drummer Pavel Fajt. The project was recorded for the Czech national radio and television (at the time part of the Soviet bloc).

In 1989 Richard formed his own band, Ferdinand et les Philosophes, a trio of Richard, guitarist Alain Rocher (later replaced by Laurent Luci) and drummer Dominique Lentin (from "Les i"). Les Philosophes performed at the 9th Victoriaville festival in October 1991, and went on to record two albums.

Richard also collaborated with English experimental guitarist Fred Frith from the English avant-rock group Henry Cow in 1989, as Fred & Ferd, to record Dropera (1991), a "twisted rock opera".

In 1993, Richard produced a concept album and performance, Arminius, with Japanese violinist Takumi Fukushima (After Dinner), German violinist Helmut Bieler-Wendt (The Blech), and Czech bass-player Vladimir Vaclavec (Dunaj) based on the work of Roman historian Tacitus. In 1995, this music was reconditioned to be the Sensurround (8-channel) music score of the theatre play La bataille d'Arminius by Jean Jourd'heuil at Théâtre Nanterre-Amandiers in Paris.

In 1996, Richard transformed "les Philosophes" into "Ferdinand et les Diplomates", with Marseille drummer Gilles Campaux and turn-tablist DJ Rebel, a cult figure from the French hip hop scene. In 2007, they released the album E-Pop (Richard's last recording) through the cryptic Japanese label Out-One-Disc.

=== Studio producer ===
As a producer, Richard has worked with the groups "MÖGEL", a female punk group from Sweden, "Les Batteries", a drum trio founded by former colleague Guigou Chenevier with British Charles Hayward (This Heat) and American Rick Brown (V-Effect), and for three albums with "Les i", a French avant-rock combo.

== Cultural career ==
In 1985, Richard founded the Aide aux Musiques Innovatrices association (A.M.I.), and in July 1986 launched the first Movement International des Musiques Innovatrices (MIMI) summer festival that takes place each year in the south of France dedicated to all kinds of innovation in music. MIMI has featured such acts as After Dinner from Japan, Iva Bittova from Czech Republic, Les Têtes Brulées from Cameroon, and André Duchesne's Les 4 Guitaristes de l'Apocalypso-Bar from Quebec, groups from New Zealand, Russia, Vanuatu, Democratic Republic of Congo, the Middle-East, etc... but also Fred Frith through diverse formations, Ornette Coleman, Jeff Mills, Terry Riley, The Ex, and many then unknown groups which became famous later. Once based in la Friche de la Belle-de-Mai in Marseille, A.M.I. became a Centre for the Development of Popular Music, and, as an urban development platform, launched various training workshops, artists residences, festivals, an incubator for cultural micro-businesses, and a consistent program of international extensions.

- 1992– : Founder member of Friche de la Belle-de-Mai, Marseille. On the 12 hectares of a former industrial site, La Friche hosts today about 70 different cultural structures. He served as Deputy Director under the presidency of architect Jean Nouvel from 1996 to 2002.
- 1994–2015 : Member of EFAH (European Forum for the Arts and Heritage, main European platform for cultural networks) now Culture Action Europe. Chairman from 1996 to 1999.
- 1997–2007 : Board member of the European Certificate in Cultural Management Orientation Board, Marcel Hicter Foundation, Bruxelles. President 2001 to 2004.
- 1997– : Lecturer for various cultural management training institutions (Institut d'Etudes Politiques, Grenoble, Lyon 2, Senghor University, Alexandria, Egypt, UniSavoie, Chambéry, Ecume European Master, Dijon, Sciences Po, Bordeaux, ARSEC, Lyon, University of Fribourg, Switzerland, Eigabigaku Uni, Tokyo, etc...).
- 1997–1998 : Steering Committee Member of the National Committee for Popular Music, commissioned by Catherine Trautmann, Minister of Culture and Communication, France.
- 1998–2005 : Founder member and Secretary of "Fanfare," an international network dedicated to urban arts emerging initiatives.
- 1998–1999 : President of Medinma, first Mediterranean music market held in Marseille (now Babel Med Music).
- 2001–2002 : Task-force member in the frame of Fabrice Lextrait's mission ("A new era for cultural implementation"), commissioned by M. Michel Duffour, State-Secretary for Cultural Decentralisation, France.
- 2002– : "Qualified Personality" at Observatoire des Politiques Culturelles, Grenoble. Board member since 2009.
- 2004–2005 : Founder member and president of Gondwana, regional federation for an African arts biennale in Marseille.
- 2005– : Board member of the Roberto Cimetta Fund, supporting mobility for artists and cultural operators in the Euro-Arab dimension. Chairman since 2009.
- 2006– : Expert/collaborator of Agenda 21 Culture commission, part of CGLU/UCLG (United Cities and Local Governments) network.
- 2010–2015 : Coordinator of the panel of experts at the UNESCO International Fund for Cultural Diversity.
- 2012–2015 : Member of the admissions jury for Kedge-Euromed-management High School, Marseille.
- 2016– : "Qualified Personality" representing the Institut du Monde Arabe, Paris at the governance of Institut du Monde Arabe, Tourcoing, France.
- 2017– : Founder and chairman of Global Grand Central, global virtual platform presenting global archives about artistic projects of all kinds and all countries.

== Selected discography ==
=== Bands and collaborations ===
Etron Fou Leloublan

- Batelages (1977, LP, Gratte-Ciel, France)
- Les Trois Fous Perdégagnent (Au Pays Des...) (1978, LP, Tapioca, France)
- En Public aux Etats-Unis d'Amérique (1979, LP, Celluloid Records, France)
- Les Poumons Gonflés (1982, LP, Turbo, France)
- Les Sillons de la Terre (1984, LP, Le Chant du Monde, France)
- Face Aux Éléments Déchaînés (1985, LP, RecRec Music, Switzerland)
- Classic guide to No Man's Land (1987, Compilation, NML 8813 C.D.)
- Compilation festival MIMI 1986 (1986, Oblique Musique)
- 43 Songs (1991, 3xCD box set, Baillemont) – compilation
- À Prague (live) (2010, CD, Gazul)
- Réédition intégrale Etron Fou Leloublan (1991, Baillemont, 3CDs)

Gestalt et Jive

- Nouvelle Cuisine (1985, LP, Moers Music, Germany)
- Gestalt et Jive Trio (1986, 2xLP, Creative Works Records, Switzerland)
- Neowise, (2020, Stream, Al Maslakh, Lebanon)
- Live in Rhein-Main.For Holli (2025, 2CD ADN, Italy)

Bruniferd

- Bruniferd (1986, LP, RecRec Music, Switzerland)
- Un Putch Kitch (1991, CD, SMI, France)
- Pas Sages, Secrets (1997, CD, ST, France)
- Compilation Festival MIMI 1988 (1989, AMI 2002)

Les 4 Guitaristes de l'Apocalypso-Bar

- Fin de Siècle (1989, LP, Ambiances Magnétiques, Canada)

Fred & Ferd (Fred Frith and Ferdinand Richard)

- Dropera (1991, LP, RecRec Music, Switzerland)

Ferdinand et les Philosophes

- ... Enclume (1991, LP, RecRec Music, Switzerland)
- Ensableur de Portugaises (1994, CD, RecRec Music, Switzerland)

Ferdinand et les Diplomates

- E-pop (2007, OUTONEDISCDDCO 1008)

=== Solo ===
- En Forme!! (1981, LP, Celluloid Records, France)
- En Avant (1983, LP, RecRec Music, Switzerland)
- Arminius (1993, Stupeur&Trompette)

=== Collaborations ===
- Morgan-Fischer, Miniatures (1980, PIPE REC)
- Guigou Chenevier, Arthur et les Robots (1980, SAPEM)
- Fred Frith, Speechless (1981, RALPH REC)
- Les Quatre Guitaristes, Fin de Siècle (1989, AMB.MAGN)
- Mia Zabelka, Possible fruit (1991, EXTRAPLATTE, EX 172 CD)
- Various Artists, Hardis Bruts (Hommage À L'Art Brut) (1992, IN-POLY-SONS, IPS 0592)
- Christiane Cohade (1993, CD)
- Tadahiko Yokogawa, Solocism (1997, DIW-SUYN Japan)

== See also ==
- Romantic Warriors II: A Progressive Music Saga About Rock in Opposition
- Romantic Warriors II: Special Features DVD
