= Manden =

Manden may refer to:

- Manding languages, spoken by the northern group of...
- Mandé peoples
