= Bolon language =

Manding language of Burkina Faso

Bolon
- Native to: Burkina Faso
- Native speakers: (23,000 cited 1998)
- Language family: Niger–Congo?: Mande; Western Mande; Manding; East Manding; Bolon

Language codes
- ISO 639-3: bof
- Glottolog: bolo1266

Bolon is a Manding language of Burkina Faso. There are two dialects, White/Southern and Black/Northern; White Bolon is partially intelligible with Jula.
