= En Avant =

En Avant, meaning "forward", "ahead" or "In front" in the French language, may refer to

- En Avant (album), a 1983 solo album by French avant-guard musician Ferdinand Richard
- En Avant (anthem), national anthem of Seychelles from 1976 until 1978
- En Avant (steam launch), first steam launch on the upper Congo River, launched in 1881
- En Avant Estuaire FC, a Gabonese football club
- En Avant Guingamp, a French football team
- En Avant Guingamp (women), a French football team
- Knock-on (rugby league), error by the player in possession of the ball in rugby league football, known as "en avant" in French
- Knock-on (rugby union), event where the ball is knocked forward in rugby union, known as "en avant" in French
