= 43 Songs =

Box set by Etron Fou Leloublan
- Released: 1991
- Recorded: 1976–1985
- Genre: Avant-rock
- Length: 202:46
- Label: Baillemont (France)
- Producer: Etron Fou Leloublan, Guigou Chenevier, Fred Frith

Etron Fou Leloublan chronology
Face Aux Éléments Déchaînés (1985)	43 Songs (1991)

43 Songs is a three-CD box set by French avant-rock band Etron Fou Leloublan (EFL). It contains all tracks from the band's five studio albums, Batelages (1977), Les Trois Fous Perdégagnent (Au Pays Des...) (1978), Les Poumons Gonflés (1982), Les Sillons de la Terre (1984) and Face Aux Éléments Déchaînés (1985). It was released in 1991. Some of the tracks were mastered from particularly noisy vinyl sources and there is no booklet included.

The box set cover depicts "Crazy Shit, The White Wolf" (the rough English translation of the band's name) on top of a broken Eiffel Tower.

== Background ==
Etron Fou Leloublan (EFL), together with Henry Cow (England), Stormy Six (Italy), Samla Mammas Manna (Sweden) and Univers Zero (Belgium), was one of the five original Rock in Opposition (RIO) bands that performed at the inaugural RIO festival in London on 12 March 1978. RIO was a musical collective of experimental music groups united in their opposition to the music industry. EFL recorded five studio albums between 1976 and 1985, and their music has been described as "Art rock with a twisted A". Their compositions are "fractured" elements of jazz, rock and pop with unusual structures that sometimes sound like "demented and absurdist small-orchestra hymns". The 43 Songs box set covers EFL's entire recording career.

== Track listing ==
Disc one
No.	Title	Writer(s)	Original album	Length
1.	"L'amulette et le petit Rabbin"	Chenevier, Ruynat	Batelages (1977)	18:07
2.	"Sololo Brigida"	Chenevier	Batelages (1977)	3:18
3.	"Yvett'Blouse"	Etron Fou Leloublan	Batelages (1977)	0:26
4.	"Madame Richard Larika"	Richard, EFL	Batelages (1977)	9:23
5.	"Histoire de Graine"	Richard, EFL	Batelages (1977)	11:20
6.	"Face à l'extravagante montée des ascenceurs, nous resterons fidèles à notre calme détermination"	EFL	Les Trois Fous Perdégagnent (1978)	6:13
7.	"Le fleuve et le manteau"	Richard, EFL	Les Trois Fous Perdégagnent (1978)	7:48
8.	"Percutant reportage au pays des fées"	EFL, Chenevier, Ruynat	Les Trois Fous Perdégagnent (1978)	0:35
9.	"Recherche pour un journal, des lunettes, une pipe et un bérêt" / "13h58, ou les petites aventures du médecin chef" / "Je veux danser avec toi"	EFL	Les Trois Fous Perdégagnent (1978)	5:53
10.	"Le désastreux voyage de piteux Python"	Richard, EFL	Les Trois Fous Perdégagnent (1978)	10:40

Disc two
No.	Title	Writer(s)	Original album	Length
1.	"P.O.I. (Pourissement des Organes Interieurs)"	Richard, EFL	Les Trois Fous Perdégagnent (1978)	6:56
2.	"Nave de bilande"	EFL	Les Trois Fous Perdégagnent (1978)	3:00
3.	"Nicolas"	Thirion, Jausserand	Les Poumons Gonflés (1982)	4:07
4.	"Mimi"	Richard	Les Poumons Gonflés (1982)	2:59
5.	"Exposition universelle"	Chenevier	Les Poumons Gonflés (1982)	1:43
6.	"Nicole"	Thirion, Richard	Les Poumons Gonflés (1982)	5:41
7.	"La musique"	Thirion, Baudelaire	Les Poumons Gonflés (1982)	3:03
8.	"Christine"	Richard	Les Poumons Gonflés (1982)	6:40
9.	"Those distant waters"	Chenevier, Richard	Les Poumons Gonflés (1982)	3:17
10.	"Upsalla"	Chenevier	Les Poumons Gonflés (1982)	2:06
11.	"Io prefero"	Thirion, Chenevier	Les Poumons Gonflés (1982)	4:30
12.	"Pas'l'sou"	Chenevier, Jausserand	Les Poumons Gonflés (1982)	3:14
13.	"Phare plafond"	Richard, Chenevier	Les Sillons de la Terre (1984)	4:14
14.	"Les vitres"	Richard, Thirion	Les Sillons de la Terre (1984)	4:47
15.	"Les alsaciennes"	Thirion	Les Sillons de la Terre (1984)	1:59
16.	"Nouveau"	Richard, Chenevier	Les Sillons de la Terre (1984)	4:14
17.	"L'enfance de guigou"	Chenevier, Meillier	Les Sillons de la Terre (1984)	6:08

Disc three
No.	Title	Writer(s)	Original album	Length
1.	"Emoi"	Chenevier, Richard	Les Sillons de la Terre (1984)	4:08
2.	"C'est pas bien"	Richard	Les Sillons de la Terre (1984)	4:00
3.	"Et qu'cet air-là"	Chenevier	Les Sillons de la Terre (1984)	2:54
4.	"Lavabo"	Richard, Meillier	Les Sillons de la Terre (1984)	5:09
5.	"Le jeu, l'alcool et les femmes"	Meillier	Les Sillons de la Terre (1984)	3:46
6.	"Lavés à la machine"	Richard	Face Aux Éléments Déchaînés (1985)	4:19
7.	"Tous le poussent"	Richard	Face Aux Éléments Déchaînés (1985)	3:39
8.	"Hors de son monde"	Chenevier	Face Aux Éléments Déchaînés (1985)	4:00
9.	"Paris 65"	Chenevier	Face Aux Éléments Déchaînés (1985)	4:04
10.	"Sous les draps"	Thirion	Face Aux Éléments Déchaînés (1985)	3:52
11.	"Comment choisir son infirmière"	Richard	Face Aux Éléments Déchaînés (1985)	3:14
12.	"Gifle Hubert"	Richard	Face Aux Éléments Déchaînés (1985)	4:45
13.	"Blanc"	Richard, Thirion	Face Aux Éléments Déchaînés (1985)	4:13
14.	"Binet d'eau froide"	Richard, Chenevier, Thirion	Face Aux Éléments Déchaînés (1985)	0:18
15.	"Plus rien ne nous retient dans ce pays"	Richard, Chenevier	Face Aux Éléments Déchaînés (1985)	3:34
16.	"Mon petit chorus"	Richard, Chenevier, Thirion	Face Aux Éléments Déchaînés (1985)	4:12

== Personnel ==
=== Etron Fou Leloublan ===
- Ferdinand Richard – bass guitar, vocals
- Guigou Chenevier – drums, percussion, tenor saxophone, vocals
- Chris Chanet (Eulalie Ruynat) (1.1–5) – winds, vocals
- Francis Grand (1.6–10, 2.1–2) – alto and tenor saxophone, melodica, flute, harmonica, zither, vocals
- Jo Thirion (2.3–17, 3.1–16) – organ, piano, trumpet, vocals
- Bernard Mathieu (2.3–12) – soprano and tenor saxophone
- Bruno Meillier (2.13–17, 3.1–5) – alto, tenor and baritone saxophones

=== Guests ===
- Jean-Pierre Grasset (1.6–9) – guitars
- Michel Grezes (2.12) – voice
- Fred Frith (2.8, 2.12, 3.8–9, 3.13, 3.15) – guitar, violin

== Production ==
- Batelages (1977)
  - Recorded in November 1976
  - Produced by Etron Fou Leloublan
- Les Trois Fous Perdégagnent (Au Pays Des...) (1978)
  - Recorded at Studio Tangara, Toulouse, France in November 1977
  - Produced by Etron Fou Leloublan
- Les Poumons Gonflés (1982)
  - Recorded at THC, Bernex, Switzerland in November 1981
  - Produced by Fred Frith
- Les Sillons de la Terre (1984)
  - Recorded at Studio THC, Geneva, Switzerland, 20–30 August 1983
  - Produced by Guigou Chenevier
- Face Aux Éléments Déchaînés (1985)
  - Recorded at Sunrise Studio, Kirchberg, Switzerland, August 1985
  - Produced by Fred Frith
