= Dropera =

Studio album by Fred Frith and Ferdinand Richard
- Released: 1991
- Recorded: August 1989
- Studio: Sound and Vision Studio, Zürich, Switzerland
- Genre: Avant-rock
- Length: 46:03
- Language: French
- Label: RecRec (Switzerland)
- Producer: Raymund van Santen

Fred Frith chronology
Attention Span (1990)	Dropera (1991)	Live Improvisations (1992)

Dropera is a concept album by Fred Frith and Ferdinand Richard, credited as "Fred & Ferd". It was their first collaborative album as a duo and was recorded in Zürich, Switzerland in August 1989. It was released on both LP and CD by RecRec Music in Switzerland in 1991. The album's songs were sung in French and a booklet of the song lyrics in French, German and English accompanied the album.

== Background ==
English experimental guitarist/composer Fred Frith and French experimental bass guitarist/composer Ferdinand Richard had previously worked together in other contexts before coming together as a duo to record this album. Frith was a founding member of the English avant-rock band Henry Cow and Richard a founding member of the French avant-rock band Etron Fou Leloublan. Their paths first crossed in the mid-1970s when Henry Cow began touring Europe. Contact consolidated in 1978 when the two bands and three others joined forces to form Rock in Opposition. In mid-1980 Etron Fou Leloublan (including Richard) recorded with Frith in France and Switzerland, and appeared on one side of Frith's 1981 solo LP, Speechless. Frith also played on and produced two of Etron Fou Leloublan's albums in 1982 and 1985.

== Content and reception ==
Professional ratings
Review scores
Source	Rating
AllMusic	3/5 stars

Dropera is a "twisted rock opera" about the comic and surreal adventure of two diners in a French restaurant involving abduction, an aircraft crash, death and re-awakening. Frith and Richard composed the music, and Richard wrote and sang the song texts. The music has been described as a mixture of avant-rock, pastorale with a little improvisation. AllMusic wrote that notwithstanding the "leaden" sound of the programmed drums, "Fans of Frith will not be disappointed with this collaboration.

== Track listing ==
Music by Fred Frith and Ferdinand Richard; lyrics by Ferdinand Richard.

Face A: On Vit!

1. "Petite Entrée: Au Restaurant, On Se Regarde!" – 3:31
2. "Tableau 1: Riche Et Mystérieux!" – 5:56
3. "Tableau 2: Mauvaise Gauche!" – 2:24
4. "Tableau 3: Deux Emballés!" – 2:52
5. "Tableau 4: Tous Cuits!" – 4:02
6. "Fin Tragique: Flottent Les Petits Morceaux!" – 2:33

Face B: On Est Mort!

1. "Enchaînement Alchimique: Nos Fantômes Naissent!" – 3:42
2. "Tableau 5: La Mer Est Notre Mère!" – 4:08
3. "Tableau 6: Ah, Que La Vie Est Dure!" – 4:59
4. "Tableau 7: Allez, On Danse!" – 4:08
5. "Tableau 8: Holà! Tu Rèves! / Fin Comique: A Quand La Suite?" – 7:48

=== English titles ===
Side A: One Lives!

1. "Petite Entrée: In the Restaurant, They Eye Each Other!" – 3:31
2. "Scene 1: Rich and Mysterious!" – 5:56
3. "Scene 2: Wrong Left Turn!" – 2:24
4. "Scene 3: Two Abducted!" – 2:52
5. "Scene 4: Everyone Fried!" – 4:02
6. "Tragic Finale: Little Pieces Floating!" – 2:33

Side B: One Has Died!

1. "Alchemical Outcome: Birth of Our Phantoms!" – 3:42
2. "Scene 5: The Sea Is Our Mother!" – 4:08
3. "Scene 6: It's a Hard Life!" – 4:59
4. "Scene 7: Hey, Let's Dance!" – 4:08
5. "Scene 8: You Must Be Dreaming! / Comic Finale: When's the Sequel?" – 7:48

Translations from the album booklet.

== Personnel ==
- Fred Frith – guitars, violins, keyboards, digital and analogue percussion, background vocals
- Ferdinand Richard – six-string bass guitar, lead vocals
- Raymund van Santen – alto saxophone, clarinet, flageolet

=== Production ===
- Recorded by Andy Rathgeb in August 1989 at Sound and Vision Studio, Zürich, Switzerland
- Mixed by Tim Hodgkinson in December 1989 at Cold Storage Studio, London
- Produced by Raymund van Santen
- Photography by Bill Gilonis
- Artwork by Peter Bäder
