= Alexandra Vydrina =

Russian linguist (1988–2021)

- Александра В. Выдрина
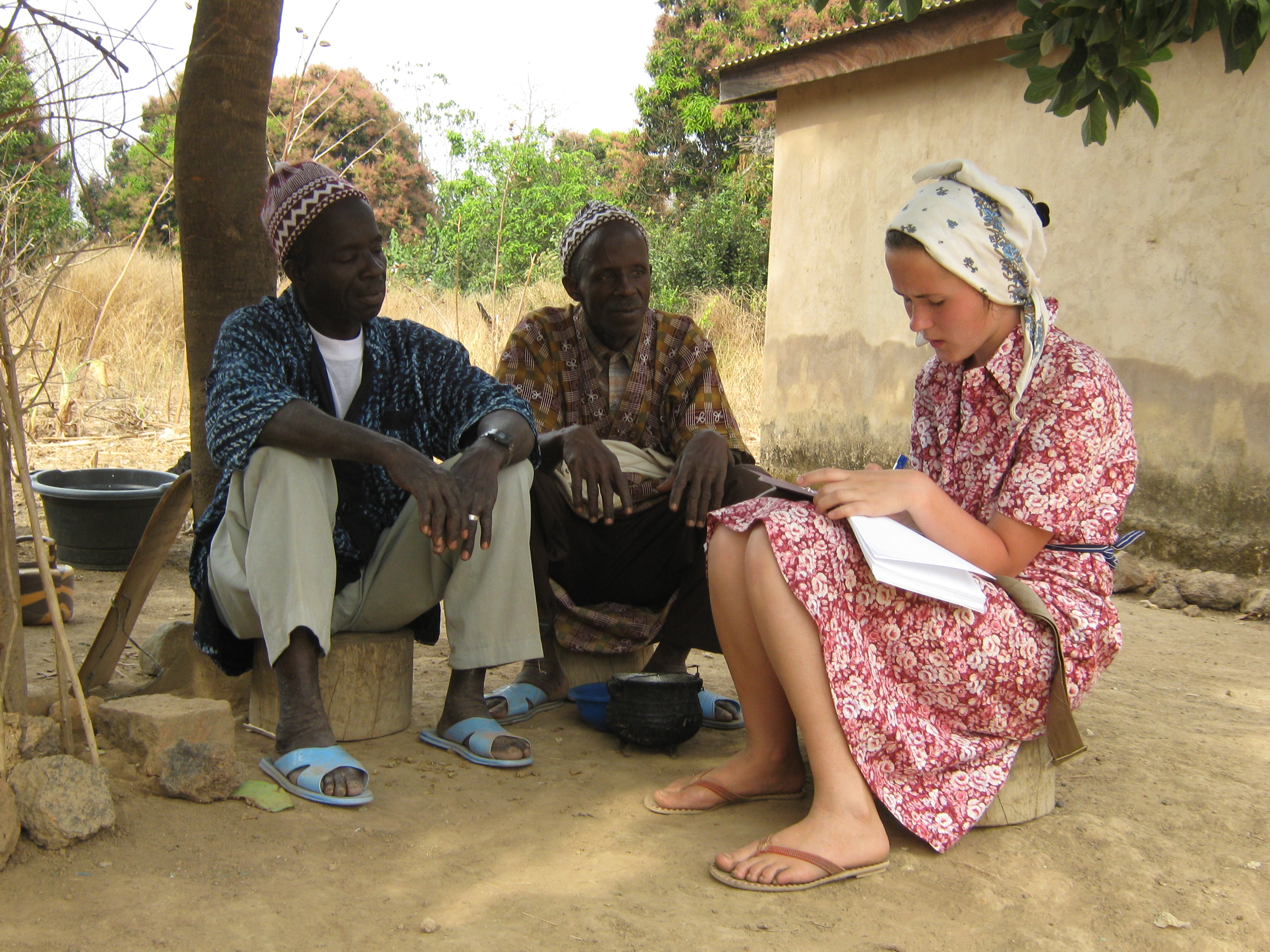
- Alexandra Vydrina collecting Kakabe language data in Saajoya village, Guinea
- Born: 2 July 1988; Belogorka, Soviet Union (now Russia)
- Died: 16 September 2021 (aged 33); Norway
- Relatives: Valentin Vydrin (father)

Academic background
- Education: Saint Petersburg State University, Institut national des langues et civilisations orientales
- Thesis: A corpus-based description of Kakabe, a Western Mande language: Prosody in grammar (2017)
- Doctoral advisor: Martine Vanhove, Dmitry Idiatov

Academic work
- Discipline: Linguist
- Main interests: Mande languages

Alexandra Vydrina (2 July 1988 – 16 September 2021) was a Russian linguist and researcher at the French National Centre for Scientific Research (Paris) specializing in research on African languages of Guinea. In West Africa, she was known as Sogolon Condé.

== Life and contributions ==
Vydrina received her education at St. Petersburg State University and in 2008 started working on the Kakabe language of Guinea, a Mande language spoken in the Fouta Djallon highland region. She was a doctoral student at INALCO (Paris), and had postdoctoral positions in the CNRS and at the Higher School of Economics (Moscow).

She completed a dictionary of Kakabe in 2015, and a comprehensive grammatical description in 2017. She also contributed to general questions of the interaction of tone and intonation with information structure, of modality, and of small-scale multilingualism from the perspective of her research on the Kakabe language.

== Works ==
=== Major works on Kakabe ===
- Vydrina, Alexandra (2015). "Dictionnaire kakabé-français suivi d'un indexe français-kakabé". Mandenkan. 53: 1–253.
- Vydrina, Alexandra (2017). "A corpus-based description of Kakabe, a Western Mande language: prosody in grammar" (Document). Paris: INALCO. Available in open access: https://tel.archives-ouvertes.fr/tel-01801759

=== Further research articles ===
- Vydrin, Valentin; Vydrina, Alexandra (2010). "Impact of Pular on the Kakabe language (Futa Jallon, Guinea)". Journal of Language Contact. 3: 86–105. doi:10.1163/19552629-90000006. S2CID 143813204.
- Vydrina, Alexandra (2011). "Лабильность в языке какабе". Acta Linguistica Petropolitana: MANDEICA PETROPOLITANA: 174–217.
- Vydrina, Alexandra (2011). "Показатель пассива в северо-западных диалектах языка какабе". Le monde mandé: Pour le cinquantième anniversaire de Valentin Vydrin.
- Vydrina, Alexandra (2013). "Le comportement tonal des marqueurs prédicatifs dans la langue kakabé". Mandenkan: Bulletin semestriel d'études ličnguistiques mandé (50): 147–170. doi:10.4000/mandenkan.283. ISSN 0752-5443.
- Vydrina, Alexandra; Vydrin, Valentin (2014). "Предварительные наброски к диалектологии какабе". От Бикина до Бамбалюмы, из варяг в греки: экспедиционные этюды в честь Елены Всеволодовны Перехвальской. Нестор-История. ISBN 978-5-4469-0242-2.
- Vydrina, Alexandra (2014). "Modes of modality: Modality, typology, and universal grammar". From agent-oriented modality to sequential: The polysemy of the marker ni in Kakabe (Mande). Amsterdam: Benjamins. pp. 379–406.
- Vydrina, Alexandra (2017). "Kakabe jazyk". Jazyki mira: Jazyki Mande. St. Petersburg: Nestor-Istorija. pp. 172–212.
- Segerer, Guillaume; Vydrina, Alexandra (2020). "Sogolon". Language in Africa. 1 (4): 55. doi:10.37892/2686-8946-2020-1-4-55-68. S2CID 241540126.
- Vydrina, Alexandra (2020). "Operator focus in discourse and grammar: The two perfectives in Kakabe". Journal of African Languages and Linguistics. 41 (1): 99–145. doi:10.1515/jall-2020-2005. ISSN 1613-3811. S2CID 222316820.
- Nikitina, Tatiana; Vydrina, Alexandra (2020). "Reported speech in Kakabe: Loose syntax with flexible indexicality" (PDF). Folia Linguistica. 54 (1): 133–166. doi:10.1515/flin-2020-2029. ISSN 1614-7308. S2CID 216554576.
- Vydrina, Alexandra (2020). "Topicality in sentence focus utterances". Studies in Language. 44 (3): 501–547. doi:10.1075/sl.18069.vyd. S2CID 225410192.
- Vydrina, Alexandra (2021). "Fouta-Djallon linguistic ecology: Between polyglossia and small-scale multilingualism". International Journal of Bilingualism. 25 (4): 959–978. doi:10.1177/13670069211023148. ISSN 1367-0069. S2CID 237829968.

== Secondary sources ==
- Guillemain, Franck. 2019. Sasha Vydrina, la langue kakabé en Guinée. Documentary film. 17 minutes. https://www.canal-u.tv/video/cnrs_ups2259/sasha_vydrina_la_langue_kakabe_en_guinee.50573
- Konoshenko, Maria (2021). "In memoriam: Alexandra Vydrina (1988–2021)". Language in Africa. 2 (3): 3–10. doi:10.37892/2686-8946-2021-2-3-3-10.
