= Kassonke language =

Manding language of Mali and Senegal

Kassonke
- Western Maninka
- Xaasongaxango
- Native to: Mali
- Ethnicity: Kassonke, Malinke
- Native speakers: 2.5 million (2009–2022)
- Language family: Niger–Congo?: Mande; Western Mande; Manding; West Manding; Kassonke

Official status
- Official language in: Mali

Language codes
- ISO 639-3: Either: kao – Kassonke mlq – Western Malinke (Malinka)
- Glottolog: xaas1235 Xaasongaxango west2500 Western Maninkakan

The Kassonke (Khassonké) language, Xaasongaxango (Xasonga), or Western Maninka (Malinke), is a Manding language spoken by the Khassonké and Malinke of western Mali and by the Malinke of eastern Senegal. Kassonke is an official language in Mali. Western and Eastern Maninka are 90% mutually intelligible, though distinct from the Mandinka (Malinke) of southern Senegal, which is a national language there.

== Phonology ==
=== Consonants ===
		Labial	Alveolar	Palatal	Velar	Uvular	Glottal
Nasal		m	n	ɲ	ŋ		
Stop	voiceless	p	t	c	k	q	
Stop	voiced	b	d	ɟ	ɡ		
Fricative		f	s		x		h
Trill			r				
Lateral			l				
Approximant				j	w		

=== Vowels ===
	Front	Central	Back
Close	i iː		u uː
Mid	e eː		o oː
Open		a aː	

== See also ==
- Bafoulabé
- Kayes
