= Mandinka language =

Mande language

Mandinka
- Mandingo
- Mandinka kaŋo مَانْدِينْكَا كَانْجَوْ Mandingo مَانْدِنْجَوْ ߡߊ߲߬ߘߌ߲߬ߞߊ
- Pronunciation: [ma.ⁿdi.ᵑka ka.ŋo]
- Native to: Senegal, The Gambia, Guinea-Bissau
- Region: Casamance, The Gambia, Senegal
- Ethnicity: Mandinka
- Native speakers: 2.1 million (2017–2022)
- Language family: Niger–Congo?: Mande; West Mande; Central-West; Central Mande; Manding-Jogo; Manding-Vai; Manding-Mokole; Manding; West Manding; Mandinka
- Writing system: Arabic, Latin, N'Ko, Garay

Official status
- Official language in: The Gambia
- Recognised minority language in: Senegal

Language codes
- ISO 639-3: mnk
- Glottolog: mand1436
- Linguasphere: 00-AAA-aa

A Mandinka speaker, recorded in Taiwan.

The Mandinka language (Mandinka kaŋo; Ajami: مَانْدِينْكَا كَانْجَوْ), also known as Mandingo, is a Mande language spoken by the Mandinka people of northern Guinea-Bissau, the Casamance region of Senegal, and The Gambia, where it is one of the principal languages.

Mandinka belongs to the Manding branch of Mande and is similar to Kassonke but with only 5 instead of 7 vowels, due to lacking the ATR distinction. The varieties spoken in the West Northern bank region in the Gambia borders on a pitch accent due to its proximity with non-tonal neighboring languages like Wolof.

== Phonology ==
Mandinka is here represented by the variety spoken in Casamance. There is little dialectical diversity.

=== Tone ===
Mandinka has two tones, high and low. Unmodified nouns are either high tone on all syllables or low tone on all syllables. The definite suffix -o takes a low tone on high-tone nouns and a falling tone on low-tone nouns. It also assimilates any preceding short vowel, resulting in a long /oo/ with either low or falling tone. It shortens a preceding long high vowel (ii > io, uu > uo; ee optionally > either eo or ee) or assimilates itself (aa remains aa) leaving only its tone:

/búŋ/ 'a room' > /búŋò/ 'the room'
/tèŋ/ 'a palm tree' > /tèŋô/ 'the palm tree'
/kídí/ 'a gun' > /kídòò/ 'the gun'
/kòrdàà/ 'a house' > /kòrdáà/ 'the house'

In Senegal and Gambia, Mandinka is approaching a system of pitch accent under the influence of local non-tonal languages such as Wolof, Serer, and Jola.

The tonal system remains more robust in the Eastern and Southern Mandinka dialects (Tilibo) spoken in the Guinea-Bissau, Guinea and Eastern Senegal. These conservative dialects merge into other conservative Manding languages like Maninka, the once official language of the Mali Empire, Bambara, and Susu. All of these preserve the typical West African terraced downstep in tonality that is only lightly alluded to in the Western Mandinka dialects spoken in much of Gambia and Senegal.

=== Vowels ===
Vowel qualities are /i e a o u/. All may be long or short. There are no nasal vowels; instead, there is a coda consonant /ŋ/. Long vowels are written double: aa, ee, ii, oo, uu.

=== Consonants ===
The following table gives the consonants in the Latin orthography, and their IPA equivalent when they differ.

		Labial	Alveolar	Palatal	Velar	Glottal
Nasal		m	n	ɲ ⟨ñ⟩	ŋ	
Stop	voiceless	(p) (Note: /g/ and /p/ are found in French loans.)	t	t͡ʃ ⟨c⟩	k	
Stop	voiced	b	d	d͡ʒ ⟨j⟩	(g)	
Fricative	voiceless	f	s			h
Approximant	plain	w	r	j ⟨y⟩		
Approximant	lateral		l			

Syllabic nasals occur, such as in nnààm 'yes!' (response), ŋte "I, me". Word-initial mb, nd, ndy, ng occur but are not particularly common; it is not clear whether they should be considered syllabic nasals or additional consonants.

Consonants may be geminated in the middles of words (at least /pp, tʃtʃ, dʒdʒ, kk, ll, mm, nn, ɲɲ/). The only other consonant found at the ends of syllables in native words is /ŋ/, which assimilates to the following consonant, e.g. /ŋs, ŋtʃ, ŋb/ → [ns, ɲtʃ, mb]. Syllable-final /r/ and /s/ are found in French loans (e.g. /kùrtù/ 'pants').

== Orthography ==
The Latin alphabet and the Arabic alphabet are widely used for Mandinka; the former is official, but the latter is more widely used and older. In addition, the pan-Manding writing system, the N'Ko script, invented in 1949, is often used in Guinea-Bissau, north east Guinea, and in bordering communities in Ivory Coast and Mali. Additionally, the Garay alphabet, originally developed for Wolof, has seen some limited use.

In the Latin script, c represents /t͡ʃ/, ŋ /ŋ/, and ñ /ɲ/; the letters v, x, z, and q are not used. Vowels are as in Spanish or Italian and are doubled to indicate length or distinguish words that are otherwise homophones.

In most places, the Ajami script uses a subset of Arabic characters for Mandinka phonemes (apart from, at times, an extra vowel mark for e).

The Latin and Arabic consonants correspond as follows:

Arabic	ا	ع	ب	ت	ط	ض	ج	ه	ح	خ	د	ر	س	ش	ص	ث	ظ	ڢ	ل	م	ن	و	ي	ك	لا
Latin	('), aa, ee	(', with madda ŋ)	b, p	t	t	t	c, j	h	h		d	r	s	s (sh)	s	s	s	f	l	m	n, ñ, ŋ	w	y	k, g	la

Letters in italics are not normally used in native Mandinka words. ه (h) may also be used to indicate a final glottal stop, which is not noted in the Latin script. The letter ŋ of the Latin script is often indicated with vowel signs in the Arabic script; see below.

The vowels correspond as follows (diacritics are placed over or under the consonant in Arabic):

Arabic	ـَ	ـِ	ـُ	ـْ	ـִ	ـً	ـٍ	ـٌ	ـَا	ـِي	ـُو
Latin	a, e	i, e, ee	o, u	(no following vowel)	e	aŋ, eŋ	iŋ, eeŋ, eŋ	oŋ, uŋ	aa	ii	oo, uu
Mandinka names of Arabic marks:	sira tilidiŋo;	sira tilidiŋo duuma;	ŋoo biriŋo;	sira murumuruliŋo;	tambi baa duuma;	sira tilindiŋo fula;	sira tilindiŋo duuma fula;	ŋoo biriŋo fula.			

In addition, a small Arabic 2 (۲) may be used to indicate reduplication, and the hamza may be used as in Arabic to indicate glottal stops more precisely.

== Vocabulary and phrases ==
- Faama: "father", "leader" or "king"
- Mansa (title): "sultan", "king" or "emperor"
- Abaraka: "thank you"
- Háa / Háa dee: "yes"
- Hàni: "no"

Súu mòolu lèe?
Home person.PL where?
"How is the family?"

(Reply)

Ì bée be jée
3PL all CONT there
"They are all fine"

Kóri tanaa te (jée)?
Hope trouble NEG (there)?
"Hope there is no trouble there"

(Reply)

Tanaa te (jée)
Trouble NEG (there)
"There is no trouble"

Í tóo ndìi?
2SG name what?
"What is your name?"

(Reply)

Ń tóo mu, _ le ti
1SG name is, _ EMPH is
"My name is _"

Ń ka táa le
1SG HAB go EMPH
"I am going"

Nàa jàŋ
Come here
"Come here"

Í kó ñáa-dìi?
2SG say manner-what?
"What did you say?"

(Reply)

Ń kó __
1SG say __
"I said __"

M̀ ma’a loŋ
1SG don't know
"I don't know"

Í ñiiñaa táa le
2SG beautiful POS EMPH
"You are beautiful/handsome"

M̀ ma’a fóo mòo ye
1SG don’t say person PST
"I did not tell anyone"

Wò pompiteeroo nàati ń ye nàng
that potato bring 1SG for come
"Bring me that potato"

Í be mìntoo le
2SG CONT where EMPH
"Where are you"

== See also ==
- Mande languages
- Manding languages
- Mandinka people
- Mandé peoples

== Bibliography ==
- R. T. Addis, A Study on the Writing of Mandinka in Arabic script, 1963.
- Dramé, Man Lafi, Parlons Mandinka, L'Harmattan 2003 (in French)
