= Pierre Grandet =

Pierre Grandet (born 1954) is a French Egyptologist.

After studying history and Egyptology at the University of Paris IV Sorbonne and the practical school of Advanced Studies, he had taught the hieroglyphics and Egyptian pharaonic civilization during Khéops in Paris and the Catholic University of Angers.

In 1996 he authored L'Égypte ancienne. He contributes regularly to the journal l'Histoire and is the author, among others, L'Égypte des grands Pharaons - Ramsès III, work on Ramesses III. In addition, he co-authored (with Bernard Mathieu) a grammar book entitled Cours d'égyptien hiéroglyphique.
