= Solomana Kante =

Guinean writer and neographer (1922–1987)

Solomana Kanté
- ߛߎ߬ߟߋ߬ߡߊ߬ߣߊ߬ ߞߊ߲ߕߍ߫
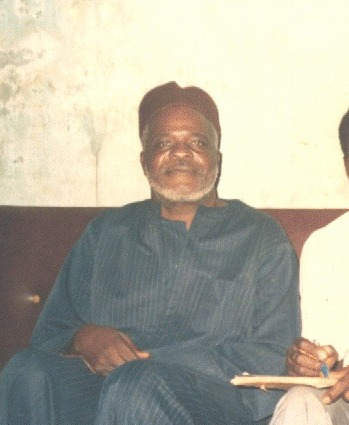
- Born: 1922; Kankan, French Guinea (now Guinea)
- Died: November 23, 1987 (aged 64–65); Conakry, Guinea

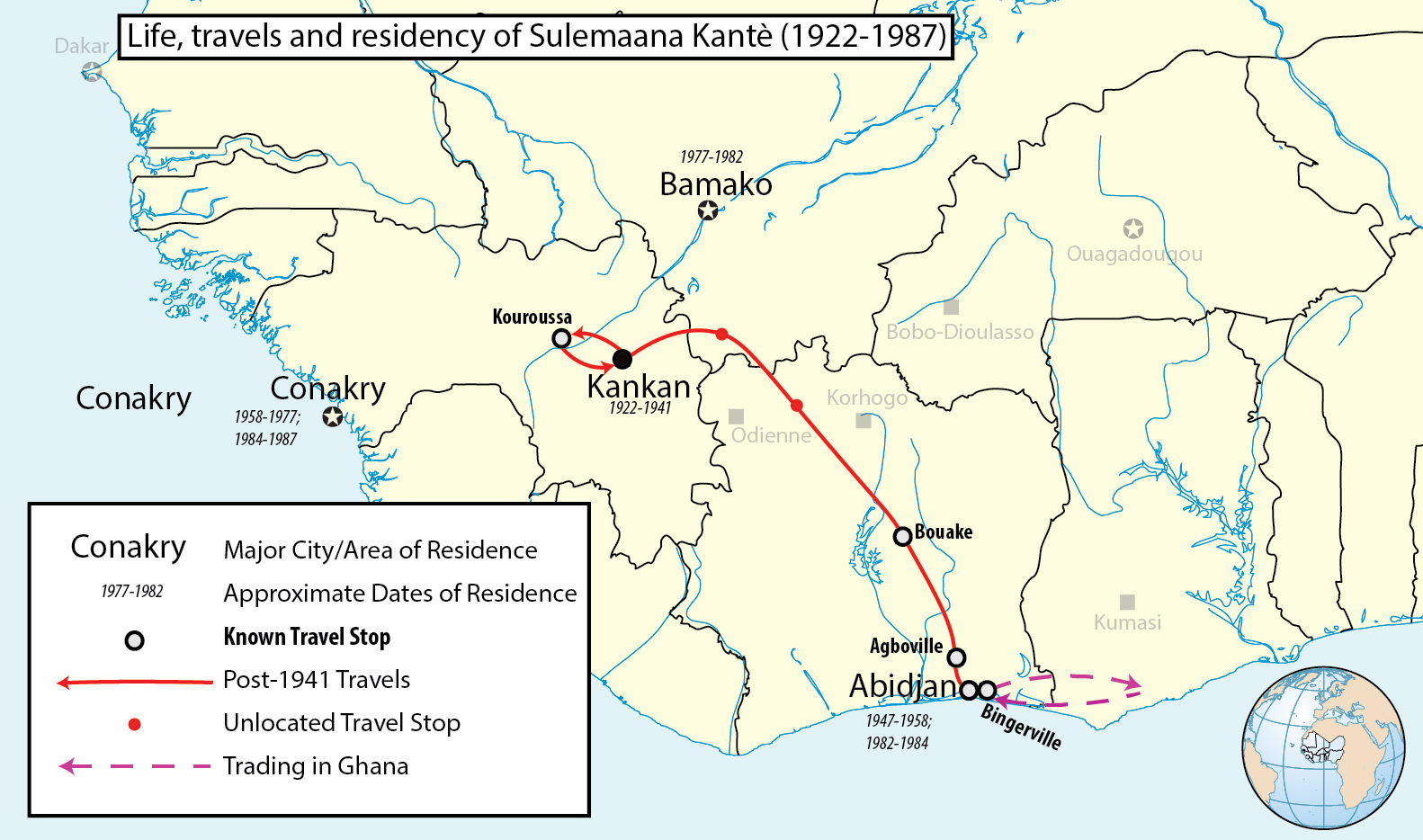
Map of the life of Sulemaana Kante, inventor of the N'ko alphabet

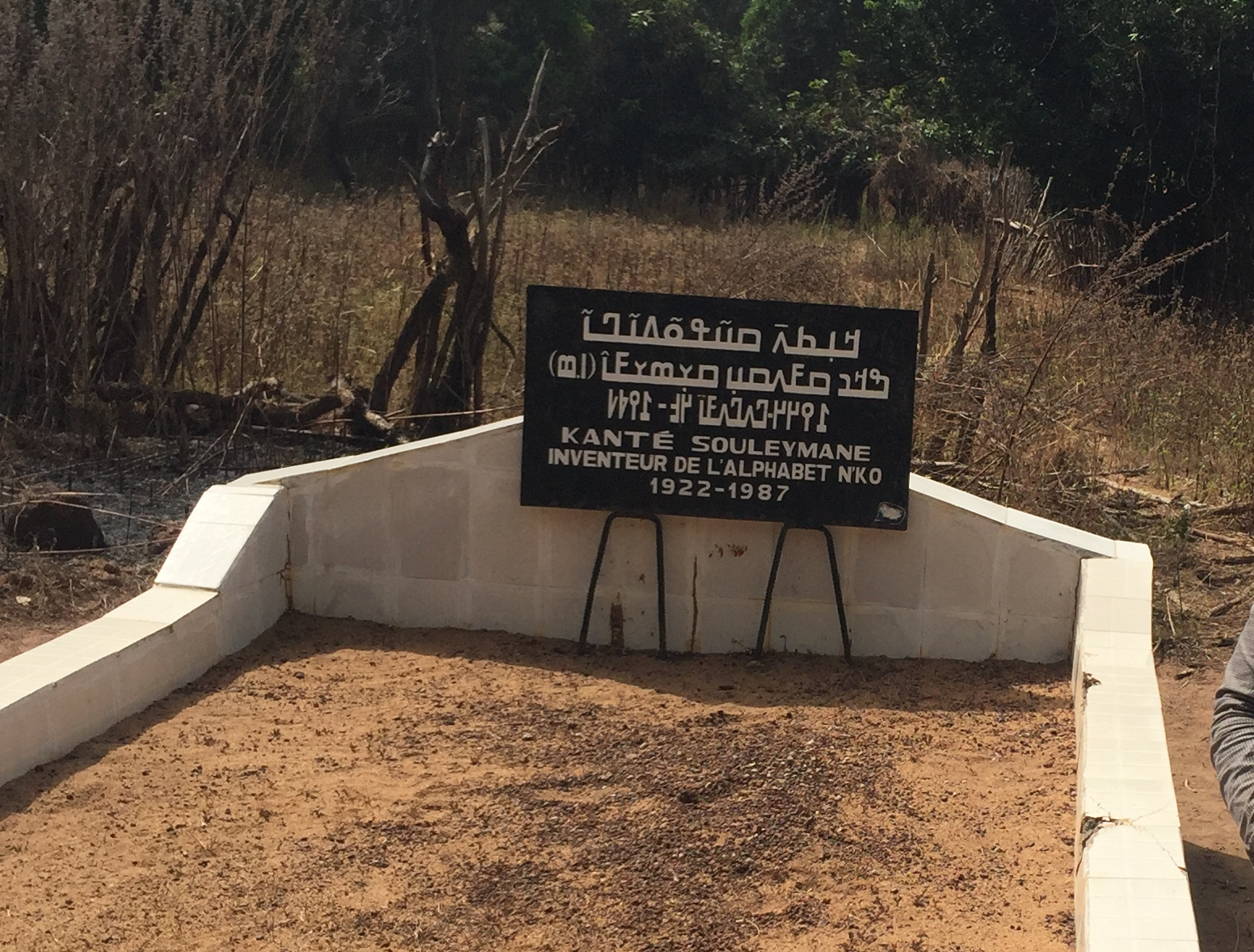
Grave of Solomana Kanté

Solomana Kanté (also written as Sùlemáana Kántε, Souleymane Kanté or Sulemaana Kantè; N'Ko: ߛߎ߬ߟߋ߬ߡߊ߬ߣߊ߬ ߞߊ߲ߕߍ߫, 1922 – November 23, 1987) was a Guinean writer, neographer, and educator, best known as the inventor of the N'Ko alphabet for the Manding language varieties of Africa.

Kanté created N'Ko, a modern script for, as he saw it, the Manding language in 1949 after five years of experimentation with various writing systems. The script first came into use in Kankan, Guinea and was disseminated from there into other Manding-speaking parts of West Africa.

== Sources ==
- Conrad, David C. (2001). "Reconstructing Oral Tradition: Souleymane Kanté’s Approach to Writing Mande History". Mande Studies 3, 147–200.
- Kaba, Diaka Laye (1992). "Souleymane Kanté: l’inventeur de l’alphabet N’ko". L’Éducateur: Trimestriel Pédagogique des Enseignants de Guinée 11–12, 33
- Kanté, Bourama (1996). "Souvenir de Kanté Souleymane". Somoya Sila: Journal Culturel de l'Association ICRA-N'KO 19.
- Kanté, Souleymane (1961). "Alphabet de la langue N’ko: ‘N’ko sebesun’." In Méthode pratique d’écriture N’ko. Kankan, reprinted by Mamady Keita (1995), Siguiri.
- Vydrine, Valentin, ed. (2001). "Lettres de Souleymane Kanté et Maurice Houis". Mande Studies 3, 133–146.
