= Valentin Vydrin =

Russian Africanist (born 1961)

Valentin Feodosyevich Vydrin (also spelled Vydrine; Russian: Валентин Феодосьевич Выдрин; born February 6, 1961, Belogorka, Leningrad Oblast) is a Russian Africanist. Until 2011, he was the head of the Department of Ethnography of African Peoples of the Kunstkamera, Professor, Doctor of Philology. He is a Graduate of the Department of African Studies of the Faculty of Eastern Studies of the Saint Petersburg State University, where he was later a lecturer. He is an author of numerous scientific works, published in Russian, French, and English, on the topic of Mande languages, including dictionaries and treatises on grammatical features.

Since 2010, he has been lecturing in France as a professor of Mande languages at the Institut national des langues et civilisations orientales in Paris.

His daughter, Alexandra Vydrina (1988–2021), was also a linguist.

== Works ==
- Manding-English Dictionary (Maninka, Bamana). Vol. 1. St. Petersburg: Dimitry Bulanin Publishing House, 1999, 315 p.
- Mandé language family of West Africa: Location and genetic classification. SIL Electronic Survey Report. Dallas, SIL International. (with T.G. Bergman and Matthew Benjamin), 2000
- On the problem of the Proto-Mande homeland // Вопросы языкового родства – Journal of Language Relationship 1, 2009, pp. 107–142.
- И опять — части речи в бамана // Типологические обоснования в грамматике: К 70-летию проф. Храковского В. С. / Под ред. А. П. Володина. — М., 2004.
- Язык бамана: Учебное пособие. — СПб.: СПбГУ, 2008.
- Фонологический тип и именная морфология пра-манде. — СПб., 2001 (дисс.).
- Тональные системы языков манде: Краткий обзор // Вопросы языкознания. — 2003. — № 2.
- К реконструкции фонологического типа и именной морфологии пра-манде // Acta Linguistica Petropolitana — Труды Института лингвистических исследований. — СПб: Наука, 2006. — Том 2, Ч. 2. — С. 9-252.
- Выдрин В. Ф., Томчина С. И. Манден-русский (манинка, бамана) словарь. — СПб: Издательство Дмитрий Буланин, 1999. — Т. 1.
