= Etron Fou Leloublan =

French avant-garde rock band

- Etron Fou Leloublan in 1982; Left to right: Guigou Chenevier, Bruno Meillier, Ferdinand Richard and Jo Thirion

Background information
- Also known as: EFL
- Origin: France
- Genre: Avant-garde rock
- Years active: 1973–1986
- Labels: Celluloid, RecRec
- Past members: Chris Chanet (Eulalie Ruynat); Guigou Chenevier; Ferdinand Richard; Francis Grand; Bernard Mathieu; Jo Thirion; Bruno Meillier

Etron Fou Leloublan (French for "Crazy Shit, The White Wolf" or "Mad Shit, the White Wolf" (Note: The band's name, "Etron Fou Leloublan" has been roughly translated from the French to "Crazy Shit, the White Wolf" or "Mad Shit, the White Wolf". The literal translation of the name is "a lump of excrement" (Etron) "mad" (Fou) "the White Wolf" (Leloublan, which is a contraction of Le Loup Blanc).)), also known as EFL, were a French avant-garde rock band founded in 1973 by actor and saxophonist Chris Chanet. They recorded five studio albums between 1976 and 1985, and released a live album, En Public Aux Etats-Unis d'Amérique recorded during a tour of the United States in 1979. Etron Fou Leloublan were best known as one of the five original Rock in Opposition (RIO) bands that performed at the first RIO festival in London in March 1978.

Etron Fou Leloublan's music has been described as a blend of punk rock, jazz, French music hall, comedy satire and "avant-garde mayhem".

== History ==
Etron Fou Leloublan were originally called Etron Fou, a trio comprising vocalist and saxophonist Eulalie Ruynat (real name Chris Chanet), Ferdinand Richard (bass guitar) and Guigou Chenevier (drums, percussion). Their first concert was on 27 December 1973, when they opened for the French progressive rock band, Magma. Etron Fou then went on to produce a "viable, musical alternative to both French rock'n'roll and French free jazz", which had stagnated at the time. In November 1976, they changed their name to Etron Fou Leloublan and recorded their first album, Batelages (1977). Chanet left the band before the album was released.

Towards the end of 1977 Francis Grand replaced Chanet on saxophone and the trio recorded their second album, Les Trois Fous Perdégagnent (Au Pays Des...). In March 1978, at the invitation of English avant-garde rock group Henry Cow, Etron Fou Leloublan joined Rock in Opposition (RIO) and performed at the first RIO festival in London with four other groups. They also played at the second RIO festival in Milan in April 1979, organised by RIO's Italian representative, Stormy Six. In November 1979, Etron Fou Leloublan toured the United States, and performances at the Squat Club in New York City and Trinity College in Hartford, Connecticut were recorded and released on a live album, En Public aux Etats-Unis d'Amérique.

Etron Fou Leloublan became a quartet in 1980 with Bernard Mathieu replacing Grand on saxophone, and the addition of multi-instrumentalist and singer Jo Thirion. In mid-1980, the band recorded with former Henry Cow guitarist Fred Frith in France and Switzerland, and appeared on one side of Frith's 1981 solo LP, Speechless. Frith produced Etron Fou Leloublan's next album, Les Poumons Gonflés (1982), on which he also guested on two of the tracks, playing violin and guitar. For their fifth album, Les Sillons de la Terre (1984) the saxophonist changed again with Bruno Meillier replacing Mathieu.

Etron Fou Leloublan recorded their last album, Face Aux Éléments Déchaînés in August 1985 as a trio of Richard, Thirion, and Chenevier, not bothering to fill the recurring vacant saxophone position. Frith produced the album and guested on four of the tracks. The band broke up in 1986.

== Members ==
- Ferdinand Richard – bass guitar, vocals
- Guigou Chenevier – drums, percussion
- Chris Chanet (Eulalie Ruynat) (1973–1976) – vocals, saxophone
- Francis Grand (1976–1978) – saxophone
- Gérard Bole Du Chaumont (1978) – saxophone
- Bernard Mathieu (1979–1982) – saxophone
- Jo Thirion (1980–1986) – organ, piano, trumpet
- Bruno Meillier (1982–1983) – saxophone

== Discography ==
=== Studio albums ===
- Batelages (1977, LP, Gratte-Ciel)
- Les Trois Fous Perdégagnent (Au Pays Des...) (1978, LP, Tapioca)
- Les Poumons Gonflés (1982, LP, Turbo)
- Les Sillons de la Terre (1984, LP, Le Chant du Monde)
- Face Aux Éléments Déchaînés (1985, LP, RecRec Music)

=== Live albums ===
- En Public aux Etats-Unis d'Amérique (1979, LP, Celluloid Records)
- À Prague (2010, CD, Gazul)
- Live at the Rock in Opposition Festival 1978 (2015, Replica Records)

=== Compilations ===
- 43 Songs (1991, 3xCD box set, Baillemont) – comprises all the studio albums

=== Appears on ===
- Miniatures - a sequence of fifty-one tiny masterpieces edited by Morgan-Fisher (1980, LP, Pipe)
- Speechless by Fred Frith (1981, LP, Ralph Records)

== See also ==
- Romantic Warriors II: A Progressive Music Saga About Rock in Opposition
