= Bernard Mathieu =

French Egyptologist (born 1959)

Bernard Mathieu (born 11 January 1959) is a French Egyptologist who was director of the Institut français d'archéologie orientale from 1999 to 2005.

== Works ==
- La Poésie amoureuse de l'Égypte ancienne. Recherches sur un genre littéraire au Nouvel Empire, Bibliothèque d'études 115, Institut français d'archéologie orientale, Le Caire, 1996 (1997 "Gaston Maspero" prize from the Académie des inscriptions et belles-lettres);
- Éditeur, avec C. Berger, des études sur l'Ancien Empire et la nécropole de Saqqâra dédiées à Jean-Philippe Lauer, Orientalia Monspeliensia, IX, Université Paul Valéry, Montpellier, 1997;
- Les textes de la pyramide de Pépi I. Description et analyse (en collaboration avec J. Leclant, C. Berger-El Naggar, I. Pierre-Croisiau), Mémoires de l'Institut français d'archéologie orientale 118/1-2, IFAO, Le Caire, 2001;
- (with Pierre Grandet) Cours d'Égyptien hiéroglyphique;
- Éditeur, avec S. Bickel, de D'un monde à l'autre. Textes des Pyramides et Textes des Sarcophages, Bibliothèque d'études 139, Institut français d'archéologie orientale, Cairo, 2004;
- La Pyramide de Khéops, une solution de construction inédite, Bernard Mathieu (preface), Jean Kuzniar (author), Éditions du Rocher, 2017;
- Les Textes de la pyramide de Pépi I, Bernard Mathieu, Institut français Archeologie Orientale du Caire, 2018
