= Dyula language =

Mande language spoken in West Africa

Dyula
- Jula, Dioula
- Julakan ߖߎ߬ߟߊ߬ߞߊ߲
- Native to: Burkina Faso, Mali, Côte d'Ivoire
- Ethnicity: Dyula
- Native speakers: L1: 2.6 million (2012–2021); L2: 10 million (2012–2013)
- Language family: Niger–Congo?: Mande; Western; Manding; East; Bambara–Dyula; Dyula
- Writing system: N'Ko, Latin, Ajami

Official status
- Official language in: Burkina Faso

Language codes
- ISO 639-2: dyu
- ISO 639-3: dyu
- Glottolog: dyul1238

A Dyula speaker speaking Mooré and Dyula, recorded in Taiwan

Dyula, Jula, Juula or Dioula (Julakan ߖߎ߬ߟߊ߬ߞߊ߲) is a language of the Mande language family spoken mainly in Burkina Faso, Côte d'Ivoire and Mali, as well as other countries, including Ghana, Guinea and Guinea-Bissau. It is one of the Manding languages and is mutually intelligible with Bambara as well as Malinke. It is a trade language in West Africa and is spoken by millions of people, either as a first or second language. Similar to the other Mande languages, it uses tones. It may be written in the Latin, Arabic or N'Ko scripts.

Dyula is one of the official languages of Burkina Faso alongside Mooré, Fula, and Bissa.

== History ==
Historically, Dyula ("jula" in the language) was not an ethonym, but rather a Manding label literally meaning 'trader'. The term used to distinguish Muslim traders from the non-Muslim population living in the same area, mainly Senufo agricultors. It then became an exonym for Manding-speaking traders such as the Bambara or the Mandinka and their languages. At the same time, however, a process of ethnogenesis across the centuries led to some communities in modern towns like Bobo-Dioulasso, Odienné and Kong adopting the label as one of their ethnic identity. These communities speak varieties of Dyula with common traits that distinguish it from the lingua franca form of Jula that one hears in markets across much of Burkina Faso and Côte d'Ivoire.

Later, the term was also used for a simplified version of Bambara, which comes from Mali, mixed with elements of Maninka. It became a widely used lingua franca. Native speakers of Manding in the Ivory Coast use the pejorative term Tagbusikan (language of the Tagbusi/people outside the traditional Manding 'culture') to refer to this simplified language, while they called their own language Konyakakan, Odiennekakan or Maukakan. The influx of millions of migrant workers from the Sahel further boostered the use of Dyula in the Ivory Coast due to the need of a lingua franca. Many Burkinabe learned Dyula while staying in the Ivory Coast and further disseminated it back home. Today, Dyula is used to at least some extent by 61% of the population of the Ivory Coast and by about 35% of the Burkinabe (mainly those living in the southern or western part of the country).

== Phonology ==
=== Consonants ===
Consonants
		Labial	Alveolar	Palatal	Velar	Glottal
Nasal		m	n	ɲ	ŋ	
Plosive	voiceless	p	t	c	k	
Plosive	voiced	b	d	ɟ	ɡ	
Fricative	voiceless	f	s			h
Fricative	voiced	v	z			
Rhotic			r			
Approximant			l	j	w	

=== Vowels ===
Vowels
	Front	Central	Back
Close	i		u
Close-mid	e		o
Open-mid	ɛ		ɔ
Open		a	

The seven vowel sounds may also be either lengthened /iː eː ɛː aː ɔː oː uː/ or nasalized /ĩ ẽ ɛ̃ ã ɔ̃ õ ũ/.

== Writing systems ==
=== N'Ko alphabet ===
The N'Ko script is an indigenous writing system for the Manding language continuum, invented in 1949 by Solomana Kanté, a Guinean educator. Today, the script has been digitised as part of Unicode, which allows it to be used easily online, but the lack of funding and the official status of French means that use of this alphabet largely happens outside of formal education and is not systematically used on street signs, etc.

=== Latin alphabet and orthography ===
Dioula orthography is regulated in Burkina Faso by the Dioula Sub-Commission of the National Commission for Languages. On 15 July 1971, the National Sub-Commission for Dioula was created and on 16 July 1971, it began a study in order to set the Dioula alphabet. An alphabet was published on 27 July 1973 and gained official status on 2 February 1979. Some letters were added later, ⟨c, j⟩ for borrowed words, and others were replaced: ⟨sh⟩ by ⟨s⟩, and ⟨ny⟩ by ⟨ɲ⟩.

Dioula Alphabet
A	B	C	D	E	Ɛ	F	G	H	I	J	K	L	M	N	Ɲ	Ŋ	O	Ɔ	P	R	S	T	U	V	W	Y	Z
a	b	c	d	e	ɛ	f	g	h	i	j	k	l	m	n	ɲ	ŋ	o	ɔ	p	r	s	t	u	v	w	y	z
Phonetic value
a	b	c	d	e	ɛ	f	g	h	i	ɟ	k	l	m	n	ɲ	ŋ	o	ɔ	p	r	s	t	u	v	w	j	z

In Burkina Faso, the Dioula alphabet is made up of 28 letters each representing a single phoneme. In the orthography, long vowels are represented by doubled letters; thus, /e/ is written ⟨e⟩ and /eː/, ⟨ee⟩. The nasalisation of a vowel is written followed by an n; for example, /ẽ/ is written ⟨en⟩.

The notation of tones was recommended in 1973, but in practice they are not written. The transcription guide published in 2003 does not reiterate this recommendation. Tones are noted solely in lexicographical works. However, to avoid ambiguity, tone marking is obligatory in certain cases.

For example:

- ⟨a⟩ he/she (third person singular pronoun)
- ⟨á⟩ you (second person plural pronoun)

== Media ==
Dioula can be heard spoken in the 2004 film Night of Truth, directed by Fanta Régina Nacro, Burkina Faso's first female director.

== See also ==
- Dyula people

== Bibliography ==
- Commission nationale des langues burkinabè – Sous-commission du dioula, Guide de transcription du Dioula, Burkina Faso, 2003
- Commission nationale des langues burkinabè – Sous-commission nationale du dioula, Règles orthographiques du Dioula, Ouagadougou, Coopération suisse, 1999, 69
- Moussa Coulibaly et Haraguchi Takehiko, Lexique du Dioula, Institute of Developing Economies, 1993 (read online [archive])
- Maurice Delafosse, Vocabulaires comparatifs de plus de 60 langues ou dialectes parlés à la Côte d'Ivoire et dans les régions limitrophes, Paris, E. Leroux, 1904, 284
- Maurice Delafosse, Essai de manuel pratique de la langue mandé ou mandingue. Étude grammaticale du dialecte dyoula. Vocabulaire français-dyoula. Histoire de Samori en mandé. Étude comparée des principaux dialectes mandé, Paris, Publications de l'INALCO, 1904, 304
- Mohamadou Diallo, « Le noyau du code orthographique du dioula du Burkina Faso », Mandekan, Bulletin semestriel d’études linguistiques mandé, o 37, 2001, 9–31
- Hien, Amélie (2000). La terminologie de la médecine traditionnelle en milieu jula du Burkina Faso : méthode de recherche, langue de la santé et lexique julakan-français, français-julakan (PhD thesis) (in French). Université de Montréal. pp. 27–31. hdl:1866/30143.
- Mamadou Lamine Sanogo (master's thesis, supervised by Bakary Coulibaly), Les syntagmes nominaux du jula véhiculaire, University of Ouagadougou, 1991, 81
- Mamadou Lamine Sanogo (DEA thesis, supervised by Bakary Coulibaly), Approche définitoire du jula véhiculaire, University of Ouagadougou, 1992, 79
- Mamadou Lamine Sanogo, « Tons, segments et règles transformationnelles en jula », Mandenkan, Paris, o 30, 1995, 41–54
- Mamadou Lamine Sanogo (University of Rouen thesis, supervised by Claude Caitucoli (URA-CNRS 1164)), Langues nationales, langues véhiculaires, langue officielle et glottopolitique au Burkina Faso, 1996, 832
- Mamadou Lamine Sanogo, « Les fondements scientifiques d'une règle d'écriture orthographique : le redoublement de la voyelle finale du défini en jula », Cahiers du CERLESHS, University of Ouagadougou, o 16, 1999, 127–144
- Mamadou Lamine Sanogo, À propos de jula à Bobo-Dioulasso, 2000, 73–83, spécial 2, PUO
- Mamadou Lamine Sanogo, « L'ethisme jula : origines et évolution d'un groupe ethnolinguistique dans la boucle du Niger », dans Y. G. Madiéga et O. Nao, 1, 2003, 370–379
- Mamadou Lamine Sanogo, « À propos des constructions du syntagme complétif en dioula », Cahiers du CERLESHS, University of Ouagadougou, o 20, 2003, 179–211
- Mamadou Lamine Sanogo, « Vers une approche sociolinguistique des dérivatifs en dioula véhiculaire », Cahiers du CERLESHS, University of Ouagadougou, o 1* er numéro spécial, June 2003, 221–223
- Mamadou Lamine Sanogo, La recherche terminologique dans un dialecte couvert : le cas du dioula, Paris, Édition des archives contemporaines, 2006, 631–639
- Y. Person, Samori : Une révolution dyula, 1, Dakar, IFAN, « Mémoires de l’Institut fondamental d’Afrique noire », 1968
- Y. Person, Samori : Une révolution dyula, 2, Dakar, IFAN, « Mémoires de l’Institut fondamental d’Afrique noire », 1970
- Y. Person, Samori : Une révolution dyula, 3, Dakar, IFAN, « Mémoires de l’Institut fondamental d’Afrique noire », 1975
