= Manding languages =

Dialect continuum of Mande languages of West Africa

Manding
- Manden
- Geographic distribution: West Africa
- Native speakers: 9.1 million (2017–2021)
- Linguistic classification: Niger-Congo?: Mande; Western Mande; Central Mande; Manding–Jogo; Manding–Vai; Manding–Mokole; Manding
- Subdivisions: Manding-East; Manding-West

Language codes
- ISO 639-3: man
- Glottolog: mand1435
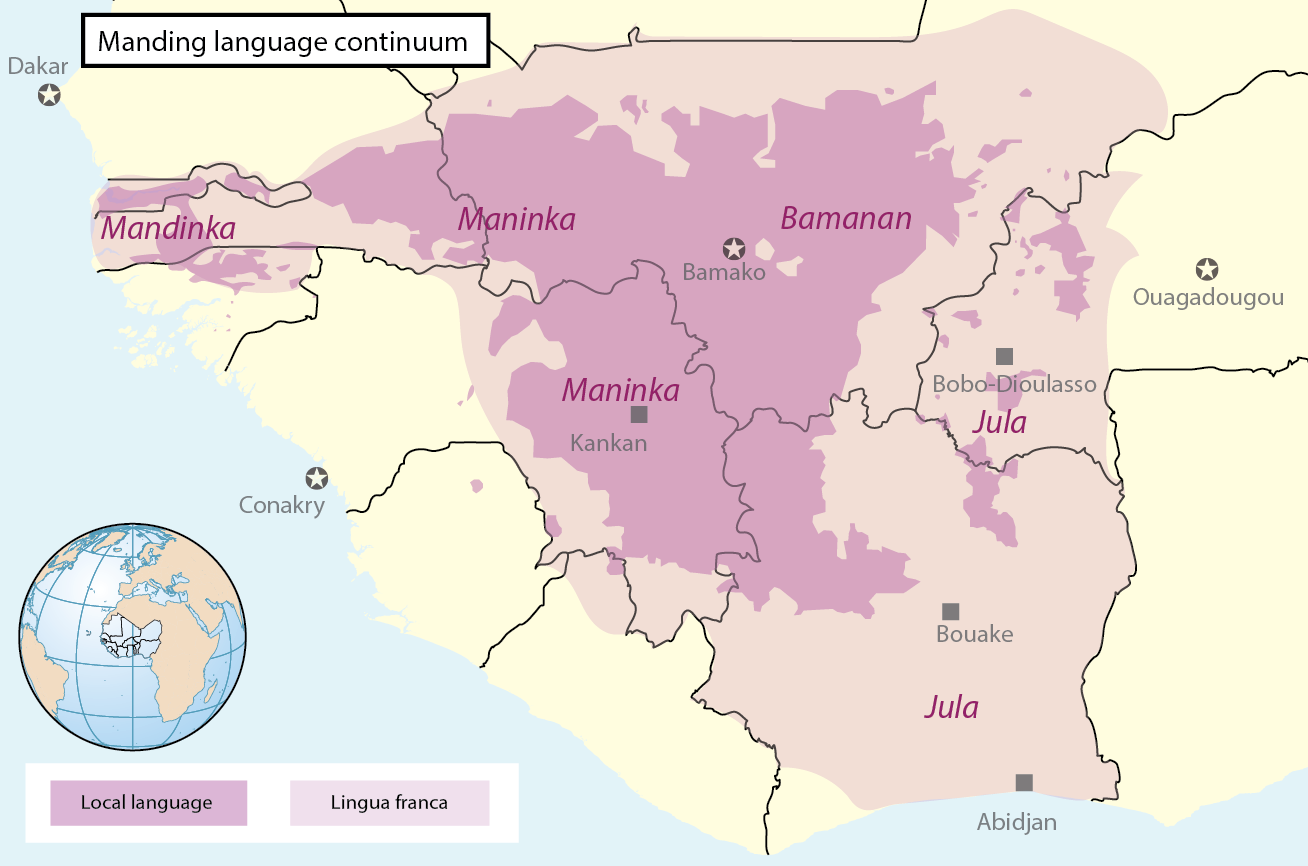
- Map of the Manding language continuum

The Manding languages (sometimes spelt Manden, and archaically Mandingo) are a dialect continuum within the Mandé family (itself possibly within the larger Niger-Congo family) spoken in West Africa. Varieties of Manding are generally considered (among native speakers) to be mutually intelligible – dependent on exposure or familiarity with dialects between speakers – and spoken by around 37 million people in The Gambia, Senegal, Mali, Burkina Faso, Guinea-Bissau, Guinea, Ivory Coast, Sierra Leone, and Liberia. Their best-known members are Mandinka or Mandingo, the principal language of The Gambia; Bambara, the most widely spoken language in Mali; Maninka or Malinké, a major language of Guinea and Mali; and Jula, a trade language of Ivory Coast and western Burkina Faso.

== Subdivisions ==
The Manding languages, the differences from one another and relationships among them are matters that continue to be researched. In addition, the nomenclature is a mixture of indigenous terms and words applied by English and French speakers since before the colonisation of Africa, which makes the picture complex and even confusing.

The Mandinka people speak varieties from the first two groups. The differences between the western and eastern branches manifest themselves primarily phonetically. While dialects of the western group usually have 10 vowels (5 oral and 5 long/nasal), the eastern group, typified by Bambara, has 14 vowels (7 oral and 7 nasal):

- Manding
  - West
    - Kassonke – Western Maninka (Mali, Senegal)
    - Mandinka (Senegal, Gambia, Guinea Bissau)
    - Kita Maninka (Mali)
    - Jahanka (Guinea, Senegal, Gambia, Mali; one of several dialects under this name)
  - East
    - Marka (Dafin) (Burkina Faso, Mali)
    - Bambara–Dyula (Northeastern Manding; Mali, Burkina Faso, Ivory Coast)
    - Eastern Maninka (Southeastern Manding; multiple varieties in Mali, Guinea, Ivory Coast)
    - Bolon (Burkina Faso)

In addition, Sininkere (Burkina Faso) is of an unclear placement within Manding.

== Writing ==
The Manding languages have a strong oral tradition, but also have written forms: adaptations of the Arabic alphabet and the Latin alphabet and at least two indigenous scripts.

- The Arabic script was introduced into the region with the arrival of Islam and was adapted to write in the Manding languages as the Ajami, which is still commonly used for Mandinka.
- The Latin script was introduced into the region following European conquest and colonization. It is used fairly widely, with "official" versions in many countries, for teaching, literacy and publication.
- The Nko script, developed in 1949 by Solomana Kante, is designed to write Manding using a common literary standard comprehensible to speakers of all these varieties. It is gaining popularity.
- A lesser-known original script was developed for Bambara in the early 20th century but is not used.

== See also ==
- Proto-Mandekan reconstructions (Wiktionary)
- Mande languages
- NKo language
