= Maninka language =

Manding language of West Africa

Maninka
- Malinke
- Maninkakan ߡߊ߬ߣߌ߲߬ߞߊ߬ߞߊ߲
- Native to: Guinea, Mali, Liberia, Sierra Leone, Ivory Coast
- Ethnicity: Mandinka
- Native speakers: 4.6 million (2012–2021)
- Language family: Niger–Congo?: Mande; Western; Manding; East; Maninka
- Writing system: N'Ko, Latin

Official status
- Official language in: Guinea, Mali

Language codes
- ISO 639-3: Variously: mku – Konyanka emk – Eastern Maninkaka msc – Sankaran Maninkaka mzj – Manya (Liberia) jod – Wojenaka (Odienné Jula) jud – Worodougou kfo – Koro (Koro Jula) kga – Koyaga (Koyaga Jula) mxx – Mahou (Mawukakan)
- Glottolog: mane1267 Manenkan mani1303 Maninka–Mori
- ELP: Koro (Cote d'Ivoire)

Maninka (also known as Malinke), or more precisely Eastern Maninka, is the name of several closely related languages and dialects of the southeastern Manding subgroup of the Mande language family (itself, possibly linked to the Niger–Congo phylum). It is the mother tongue of the Malinké people in Guinea, where it is spoken by 3.1 million people and is the main language in the Upper Guinea region, and in Mali, where the closely related Bambara is a national language, as well as in Liberia, Sierra Leone and Ivory Coast, where it has no official status. It was the language of court and government during the Mali Empire.

== Phonology ==
The Wudala dialect of Eastern Maninka, spoken in the central highlands of Guinea and comprehensible to speakers of all dialects in that country, has the following phonemic inventory. (Apart from tone, which is not written, sounds are given in orthography, as IPA values are not certain.)

=== Tones ===
There are four tones: high, low, rising and falling

The marker for definiteness is a falling floating tone:

/kɔ̀nɔ̀/ 'a bird' (LL), /kɔ̀nɔ᷈/ 'the bird' (LLHL, perhaps [kɔ̌nɔ̂])
/kɔ́nɔ̀/ 'a belly' (HL), /kɔ́nɔ᷈/ 'the belly' (HLHL, perhaps [kɔ̂nɔ̂])

=== Vowels ===
Vowel qualities are /i e ɛ a ɔ o u/. All may be long or short, oral or nasal: /iː eː ɛː aː ɔː oː uː/ and /ĩ ẽ ɛ̃ ã ɔ̃ õ ũ/. (It may be that all nasal vowels are long.) Nasal vowels nasalize some following consonants.

=== Consonants ===
Maninkaka consonants
		Labial	Alveolar	Palatal	Dorsal	Labial–velar
Nasal		m	n	ɲ		
Stop	voiced	b	d ~ ɾ	ɟ	g ~ g͡b	
Stop	voiceless	p	t	c	k	
Fricative		f	s		h	
Approximant			l	j		w

/d/ typically becomes a flap [ɾ] between vowels. /c/ (also written ⟨ty⟩) often becomes /k/ before the vowels /i/ or /ɛ/. There is regional variation between /g/ and the labial–velar /g͡b/. /h/ occurs mostly in Arabic loans, and is established. /p/ occurs in French and English loans, and is in the process of stabilizing.

Several voiced consonants become nasals after a nasal vowel. /b/ becomes /m/, /j/ becomes /ɲ/, and /l/ becomes /n/. For example, nouns ending in oral vowels take the plural in -lu; nouns ending in nasal vowels take -nu. However, /d/ remains oral, as in /nde/ "I, me".

== Writing ==
Maninka in Guinea is written in an official Latin-based script, an older official orthography (also Latin-based), and the N'Ko script.
