= Bambara language =

Manding language of Mali

Bambara
- Bamanankan بَمَنَنكَن ߓߡߊߣߊ߲ߞߊ߲
- Native to: Mali
- Region: central southern Mali
- Ethnicity: Bamana
- Speakers: L1: 4.2 million (2012); L2: 10 million (2012)
- Language family: Niger–Congo?: Mande; Western; Manding; East; Bambara–Dyula; Bambara
- Writing system: Latin script Arabic script (Ajami); NKo script Masaba

Official status
- Official language in: Mali (co-official)

Language codes
- ISO 639-1: bm
- ISO 639-2: bam
- ISO 639-3: bam
- Glottolog: bamb1269

Bambara or Bamana (N'Ko script: ߓߡߊߣߊ߲), also known as Malian or Bamanankan (N'Ko script: ߓߡߊߣߊ߲ߞߊ߲; Arabic script: بَمَنَنكَن), is a lingua franca and national language of Mali spoken by perhaps 14 million people, natively by 4.2 million Bambara people and about 10 million second-language users. It is estimated that about 80 percent of the population of Mali speak Bambara as a first or second language. It has a subject–object–verb clause structure and two lexical tones.

== Classification ==
Bambara is a variety of a group of closely related languages called Manding, whose native speakers trace their cultural history to the medieval Mali Empire. Varieties of Manding are generally considered (among native speakers) to be mutually intelligible – dependent on exposure or familiarity with dialects between speakers – and spoken by 9.1 million people in the countries Burkina Faso, Senegal, Guinea-Bissau, Guinea, Liberia, Ivory Coast and the Gambia. Manding is part of the larger Mandé family of languages.

== Geographical distribution ==
Bambara is spoken throughout Mali as a lingua franca. The language is most widely spoken in the areas east, south, and north of Bamako, where native speakers and/or those that identify as members of the Bambara ethnic group are most densely populated. These regions are also usually considered to be the historical geographical origin of Bambara people, particularly Ségou, after diverging from other Manding groups.

== Dialects ==
The main dialect is Standard Bamara, which has significant influence from Maninkakan. Bambara has many local dialects: Kaarta, Tambacounda (west); Beledugu, Bananba, Mesekele (north); Jitumu, Jamaladugu, Segu (center); Cakadugu, Keleyadugu, Jalakadougu, Kurulamini, Banimɔncɛ, Cɛmala, Cɛndugu, Baninkɔ, Shɛndugu, Ganadugu (south); Kala, Kuruma, Saro, dialects to the northeast of Mopti (especially Bɔrɛ); Zegedugu, Bɛndugu, Bakɔkan, Jɔnka (southeast).

== Phonology ==
=== Consonants ===
	Labial		Alveolar		Palatal		Velar		Glottal
Nasal	m		n		ɲ		ŋ		
Plosive	p	b	t	d	t͡ʃ ⟨c⟩	d͡ʒ ⟨j⟩	k	ɡ	
Fricative	f		s	z	(ʃ) ⟨sh⟩		(ɣ) ⟨kh⟩		h
Approximant	w		l		j ⟨y⟩				
Trill			r						

Each consonant represents a single sound with some exceptions:

- "W" is pronounced as in English (e.g. wait) except at the end of a word, when it is the plural mark and is pronounced as [u].
- "S" is pronounced most often as in the English word "see" but is sometimes pronounced as "sh" [ʃ] as in the word "shoe" or as [z].
- "G" is pronounced most often as in the English word "go" but in the middle of a word, it can be pronounced as in the Spanish word "abogado" ([ɣ]) and sometimes at the beginning of a word as [gw].

=== Vowels ===
	Front	Central	Back
Close	i iː ĩ		u uː ũ
Close-mid	e eː ẽ		o oː õ
Open-mid	ɛ ɛː ɛ̃		ɔ ɔː ɔ̃
Open		a aː ã	

=== Tone ===
The language has two (mid/standard and high) tones; e.g. sa 'die' vs. sá 'snake.'

== Writing ==
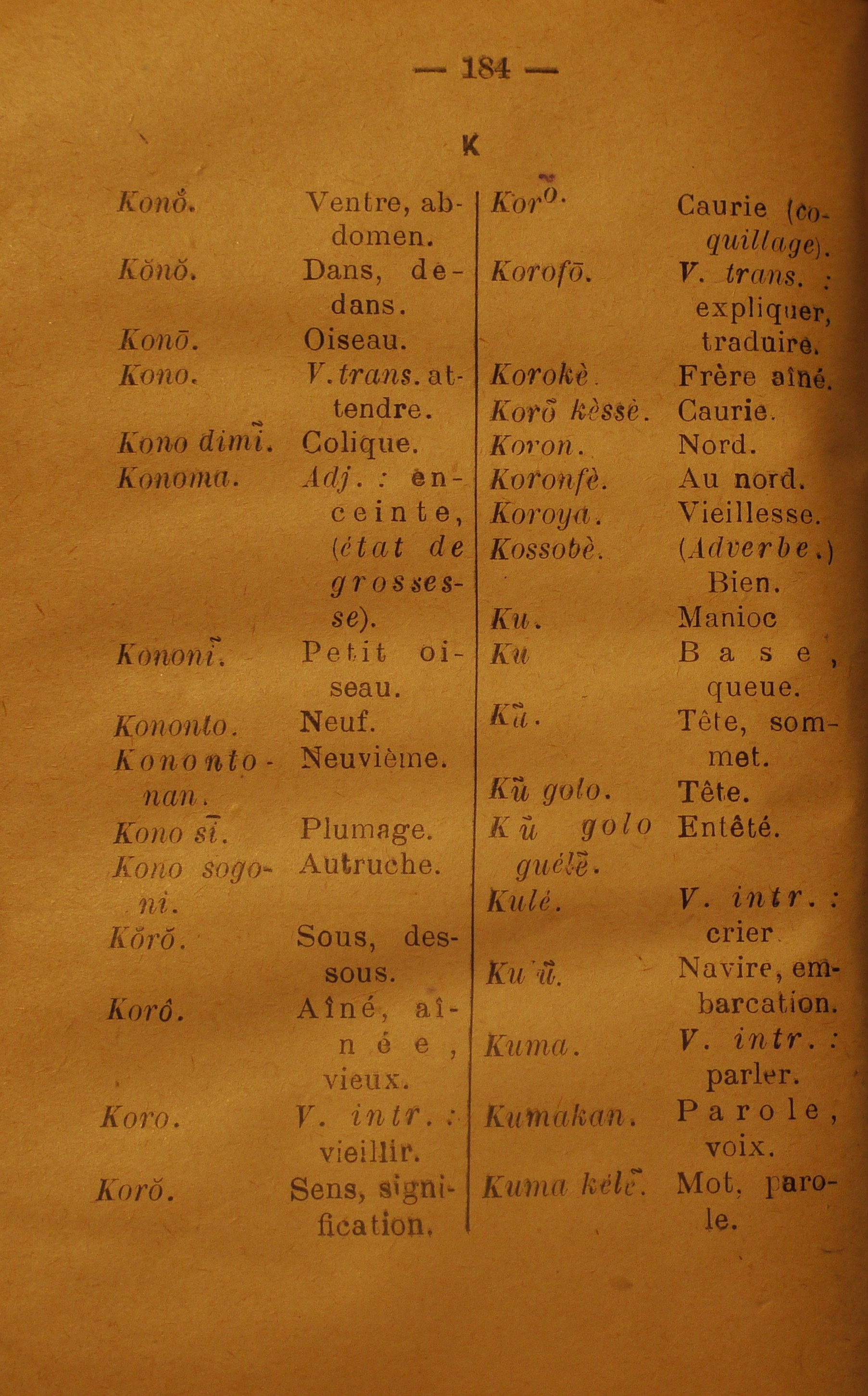
Page from Francis Delaforge's Grammaire et méthode Bambara (1949)

Since 1967, Bambara has mostly been written in the Latin script, using some additional phonetic characters from the Africa Alphabet. The vowels are a, e, ɛ (formerly è), i, o, ɔ (formerly ò), u; accents can be used to indicate tonality. The former digraph ny is now written ɲ when it designates a palatal nasal; the ny spelling is kept for the combination of a nasal vowel with a subsequent oral palatal glide. Following the 1966 Bamako spelling conventions, a velar nasal "ŋ" is written as "ŋ", although in early publications it was often transcribed as ng or nk.

The N'Ko (N'Ko: ߒߞߏ) alphabet is a script devised by Solomana Kante in 1949 as a writing system for the Manding languages of West Africa; N'Ko means 'I say' in all Manding languages. Kante created N'Ko in response to what he felt were beliefs that Africans were a "cultureless people" since prior to this time there had been no indigenous African writing system for his language. N'ko first gained a strong user base around the Maninka-speaking area of Kante's hometown of Kankan, Guinea and disseminated from there into other Manding-speaking parts of West Africa. N'ko, and the Arabic script, also known as the Ajami script, are still in use for Bambara, although only the Latin-based orthography is officially recognized in Mali.

Additionally, a script known as Masaba or Ma-sa-ba was developed for the language beginning in 1930 by Woyo Couloubayi (c. 1910-1982) of Assatiémala. Named for the first characters in Couloubayi's preferred collation order, Masaba is a syllabary which uses diacritics to indicate vowel qualities such as tone, length, and nasalization. Though not conclusively demonstrated to be related to other writing systems, Masaba appears to draw on traditional Bambara iconography and shares some similarities with the Vai syllabary of Liberia and with Arabic-derived secret alphabets used in Hodh (now Hodh El Gharbi and Hodh Ech Chargui Regions of Mauritania). As of 1978, Masaba was in limited use in several communities in Nioro Cercle for accounting, personal correspondence, and the recording of Muslim prayers; the script's current status and prevalence is unknown.

=== Latin orthography ===
It uses seven vowels a, e, ɛ, i, o, ɔ and u, each of which can be nasalized, pharyngealized and murmured, giving a total number of 21 vowels (the letters approximate their IPA equivalents). Writing with the Latin alphabet began during the French colonization, and the first orthography was introduced in 1967. Literacy is limited, especially in rural areas. Although written literature is only slowly evolving (due to the predominance of French as the "language of the educated"), there exists a wealth of oral literature, which is often tales of kings and heroes. This oral literature is mainly passed on by the griots (Jeliw in Bambara) who are a mixture of storytellers, praise singers, and human history books who have studied the trade of singing and reciting for many years. Many of their songs are very old and are said to date back to the old empire of Mali.

== Grammar ==
The basic sentence structure is subject–object–verb (SOV). Take the phrase, n t'a lon (I don't know [it]). n is the subject (I), a is the object (it), and [ta] lon is the verb ([to] know). The t' is from the negative present tense marker té, bé being the affirmative present tense marker (n b'a don would mean "I know it"). Like many SOV languages, Bambara uses postpositions rather than prepositions - their role being similar to English prepositions but placed after the noun.

The typical argument structure of the language consists of a subject, followed by an aspectival auxiliary, followed by the direct object, and finally a transitive verb.

Bambara does not inflect for gender. Gender for a noun can be specified by adding a suffix, -cɛ or -kɛ for male and -muso for female. The plural is formed by attaching a vocalic suffix -u, most often with a low tone (in the orthography, -w) to nouns or adjectives.

=== Loan words ===
Bambara lexicon contains some borrowings from Arabic, especially in the domains of religion and commerce. These Arabic loanwords are considered "very well" integrated, and some were first passed into Soninke before being borrowed into Bambara. Additionally, Bamanakan has also received loanwords from other West African languages like Wolof and Baoulé as well as French.

In urban areas, many Bamanankan conjunctions have been replaced in everyday use by French borrowings that often mark code-switches. The Bamako dialect makes use of sentences like: N taara Kita mais il n'y avait personne là-bas. : I went to Kita [Bamanankan ] but there was no one there [French]. The sentence in Bamanankan alone would be Ń taara Kita nka mɔkɔ si tun tɛ yen. The French proposition "est-ce que" is also used in Bamanankan; however, it is pronounced more slowly and as three syllables, [ɛsikə].

Bamanankan uses many French loan words. For example, some people might say: I ka kurusi ye nere ye: "Your skirt is yellow" (using a derivation of jaune, the French word for yellow, they often use joni.)

However, one could also say: I ka kulosi ye nɛrɛmukuman ye, also meaning "your skirt is yellow." The original Bamanankan word for yellow comes from "nɛrɛmuku," being flour (muku) made from néré (locust bean), a seed from a long seed pod. Nɛrɛmuku is often used in sauces in Southern Mali.

Most French loan words are suffixed with the sound 'i'; this is particularly common when using French words which have a meaning not traditionally found in Mali. For example, the Bamanankan word for snow is niegei, based on the French word for snow neige. As there has never been snow in Mali, there was no unique word in Bamanankan to describe it.

=== Examples ===
N bɛ bamanankan mɛn dɔɔni-dɔɔni
I AUX.positive Bambara hear small-small
I understand/hear a little bit of Bambara

I tɛna dumuni ke wa?
you AUX.NEG.FUT eating do Q
Aren't you going to eat?

{Du Mara} be ameriki hali bi wa?
{Dou Mara} aux America even today Q
Is Dou Mara still living in the United States?

== Music ==
Malian artists such as Oumou Sangaré, Sidiki Diabaté, Fatoumata Diawara, Rokia Traoré, Ali Farka Touré, Habib Koité and the married duo Amadou & Mariam often sing in Bambara. Lyrics in Bambara occur on Stevie Wonder's Journey Through "The Secret Life of Plants". In 2010, Spanish rock group Dover released its 7th studio album I Ka Kené with the majority of lyrics in Bambara, Spanish, English and French. American rapper Nas also released a track titled "Patience" in 2010, which featured Damian Marley and extensively sampled the Amadou & Mariam song "Sabali", as sabali is a Bambara word meaning patience.

== Legal status ==
Bambara was until 2023 one of several languages designated by Mali as a national language.

In 2023, after a new constitution was approved by a majority of voters, Bambara became co-official, together with 12 other languages spoken in the country. French was removed as the official language and was kept only as a working language.
