= Narasingapuram =

Narasingapuram may refer to any of the following places in India:

- Narasingapuram, Gummidipoondi, Tiruvalluvar district, Tamil Nadu
- Narasingapuram, Papanasam taluk, Thanjavur district, Tamil Nadu
- Narasingapuram, Pattukkottai taluk, Thanjavur district, Tamil Nadu
- Narasingapuram, Salem, Tamil Nadu
- Narasingapuram, Vellore, Tamil Nadu

== See also ==
- Narsinghpur (disambiguation)
- Narasimha (disambiguation)
