= Narasimha (disambiguation) =

Narasimha is an avatar of the Hindu god Vishnu.

Narasimha or variants may also refer to:

== People ==
- Saluva Narasimha Deva Raya (r. c. 1485–1491 CE), Indian emperor of the Vijayanagara Empire from the Saluva dynasty
- Narasimha (Kalachuri dynasty) (r. c. 1153-1163 CE), Indian king from the Kalachuri dynasty of Tripuri
- Narasingha Deva I (r. c. 1238–1264 CE), Indian king from the Eastern Ganga dynasty
- Narasimha Rao, an Indian surname
- Narasimharaju (disambiguation)
- Narasimha Reddy (disambiguation)
- Nṛsiṃha (born c. 1586), Indian astronomer and mathematician

== Films ==
- Narsimha (1991 film), an Indian Hindi-language action drama film
- Narasimha (2001 film), an Indian Tamil-language action film
- Narasimha (2012 film), an Indian Kannada-language film
- Narasinha Avatar, a 1949 Indian film about the avatar
- Mahavatar Narsimha, a 2024 Indian animated film about the avatar

== See also ==
- Narashimhika or Pratyangira, a related goddess who saved Narasimha
- Narasimhan, an Indian surname
- Narasimham (disambiguation)
- Narsinghpur (disambiguation)
- Narasingapuram (disambiguation)
- Narsinghgarh (disambiguation)
- Lakshminarasimha Temple (disambiguation)
- Narasimha Konda, a hill near Jonnawada, Nellore district, Andhra Pradesh, India
- Narasimha Temple, Bhubaneswar, Odisha, India
