= Narsinghpur (disambiguation) =

Narsinghpur is a city in Madhya Pradesh, India.

Narsinghpur may also refer to:

== Madhya Pradesh ==
- Narsinghpur district, a district of Madhya Pradesh with its headquarters at Narsinghpur
- Narsinghpur State, a former principality with its capital at Narsinghpur
- Narsinghpur railway station, a train station in Narsinghpur
- Narsingpur Assembly constituency

== Other places ==
- Narsinghpur, Ghazipur, a village in Uttar Pradesh
- Narsinghpur, Mainpuri, a village in Uttar Pradesh
- Narsinghpur, Raebareli, a village in Uttar Pradesh

== See also ==
- Narsingpura, a city in Rajasthan, India
- Nira Narsingpur, a village in Maharashtra, India
- Narasimha (disambiguation), also called Narsingh, one of Vishnu's avatars
- Narasimhapuram, a village in Andhra Pradesh with a similar name
- Narasingapuram (disambiguation)
- Narsinghgarh (disambiguation)
