= Kovvali =

Kovvali may refer to:

- Kovvali Lakshmi Narasimha Rao, a Telugu writer
- Kovvali, West Godavari district, a village in Denduluru mandal
