= Narasimha Rao =

Narasimha Rao or Narasimharao is an Indian name. It may refer to:

- P. V. Narasimha Rao (1921–2004), ninth prime minister of India
- Panuganti Lakshminarasimha Rao (1865–1940), Telugu writer
- Vinjamuri Venkata Lakshmi Narasimha Rao (1887–?), Indian stage actor and Telugu-Sanskrit pandit
- Sthanam Narasimha Rao (1902–1971), Indian stage artist
- Sistla Venkata Lakshmi Narasimha Rao (1911–2006), senior advocate and trade union activist
- Kovvali Lakshmi Narasimha Rao (1912–1975), Indian novelist
- M. V. Narasimha Rao (born 1954), Indian cricketer
- Garikapati Narasimha Rao (born 1958), Telugu writer and avadhani

== See also ==
- Narasimharao Pet, a neighbourhood of Eluru, Andhra Pradesh
- Narasimha (disambiguation)
