= Narasingha Deva I =

Eastern Ganga emperor from 1238 to 1264

'Gajapati' Narasingha Deva I ଗଜପତି ଲାଙ୍ଗୁଳା ନରସିଂହ ଦେବ ୧
- Yavanabaniballava; Hammiramanamardana; Gajapati; Paramamaheswara; Durgaputra; Purushottamaputra; Dharma-maharaja; Maharajadhiraja; Dharmaparayan
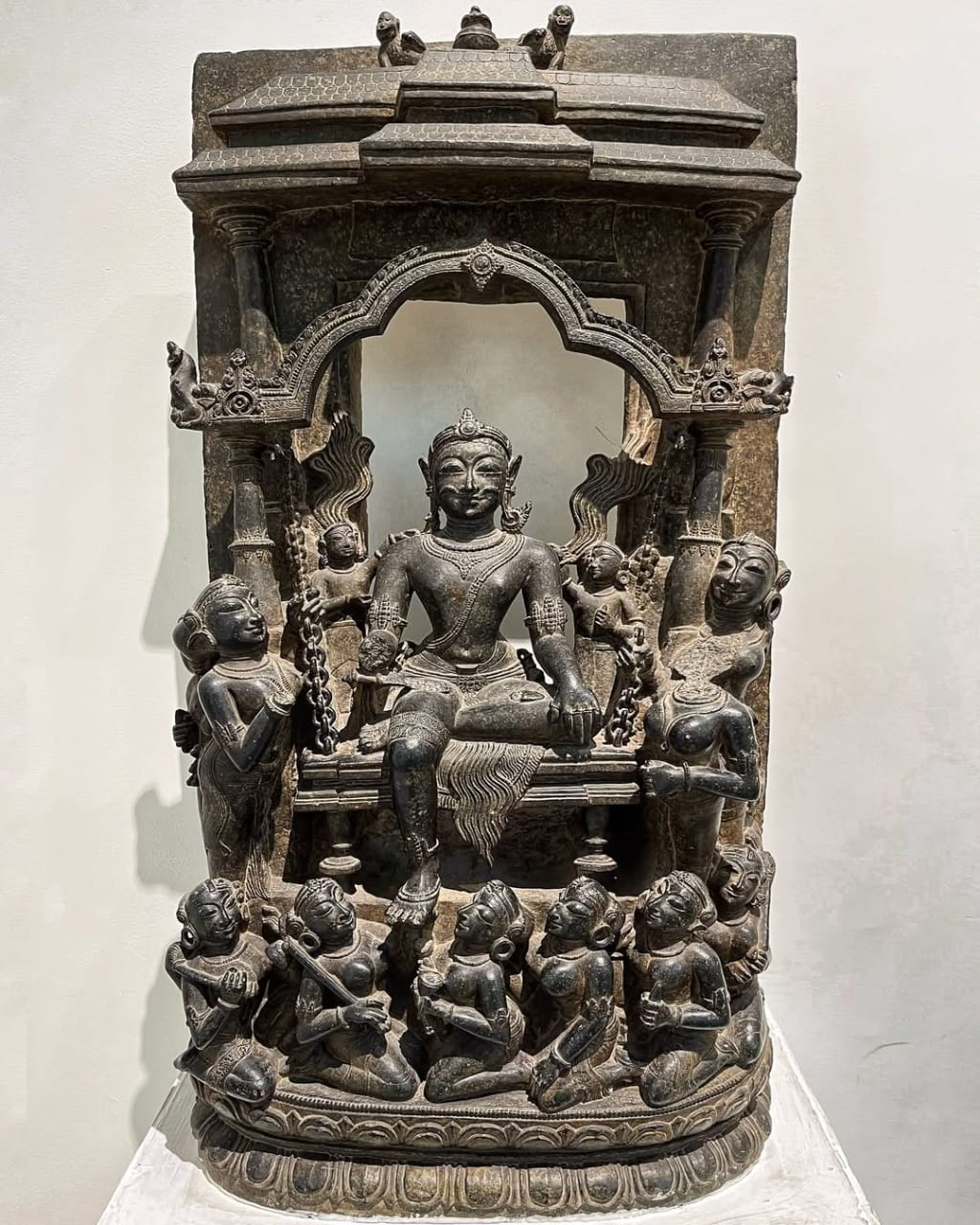
- Broken stone panels from Konark ruins depicting Narasingha Deva I sitting at his court room.

Eastern Ganga Emperor
- Reign: 1238–1264
- Predecessor: Anangabhima Deva III
- Successor: Bhanu Deva I

Kalingadhipati
- Reign: 1238–1246

Kalingadhipati Gajapati
- Reign: 1246–1264
- Born: Kataka, Kalinga, Eastern Ganga dynasty
- Spouse: Sita Devi; Choda Devi; etc.
- Issue: Bhanudeva I
Regnal name
- Yavanibaniballava Virashree Gajapati Langula Narasingha Deva
- House: Eastern Ganga dynasty
- Father: Anangabhima Deva III
- Mother: Kastura Devi
- Religion: Hinduism
- Military career
- Conflicts: Battle of Katasin

Gajapati Langula Narasingha Deva I (Odia: ଗଜପତି ଲାଙ୍ଗୁଳା ନରସିଂହ ଦେବ ୧) was an Eastern Ganga monarch and a warrior of the Kalinga region who reigned from 1238 to 1264. He defeated the Muslim forces of Bengal who constantly threatened the Eastern Ganga dynasty's rule over his kingdom of Kalinga from the times of his father Anangabhima Deva III. He was the first king from Kalinga and one of the few rulers in India who took the offensive against the Islamic expansion over India by Muslim invaders of Eastern India. His father had successfully defended his kingdom against the Muslim rulers of Bengal and crossed into Rarh, Gauda and Varendra in Bengal chasing the invaders on backfoot. He became the dominant ruler of the peninsula by defeating the Muslims, Gouda, and the powerful monarch of the south kakatiya Dynasty king Ganapati Deva, and was one of the most powerful Hindu rulers in India. He also built the Konark temple to commemorate his victories over the Muslims as well as other temples and the largest fort complex of Eastern India at Raibania in Balasore. He also built famous Varaha Lakshmi Narasimha Temple at Simhachalam, Andhra Pradesh. The Kendupatana plates of his grandson Narasingha Deva II mention that Sitadevi, the queen of Narasingha Deva I was the daughter of the Paramara king of Malwa.

== Myths about the name 'Langula' ==
The term Langula has been confused for many abrupt derivations about the name of Narasimha Deva I as many interpreters have compared the word with the Odia term Languda meaning tail in different ways. Some interpreters without looking at the living era depictions of the king himself from Konark sun temple, have abruptly narrated that the king was physically disabled which was significantly visible in the form of an extended spinal cord resembling a tail. However, some other interpreters have described that the king used to wear a very long sword which explained this name of his while others have associated the name with the river Vamsadhara which is also locally known as Languli or Languliya without any prevailing evidence.

One correct interpretation comes from the late medieval period work of Gangavashanucharitam compiled by Vasudeva Somayaji in the eighteenth century of the small princedom of the rulers who were the descendants of the Eastern Gangas in southern Odisha. In one of the sections of this work, one of the court poets known as Vidyaranava has narrated that there were six kings by the name of Narasingha or Narasimha in the Ganga dynasty lineage before his time out of which the first was the son of Anangabhima Deva III and used to wear a long robe. When he walked fast due to his aggressive nature, his long robe resembled a tail and hence the king came to be known as Langula Narasimha Deva. He ruled for 27 years. Besides this accurate historical evidence in sync with the Konark sun temple's multiple stone panel depictions of the king, there is no other existing evidence that support any of the other interpretations about the term 'Langula' as the name of the Narasingha Deva I.

== Literary glorification by contemporary poets ==
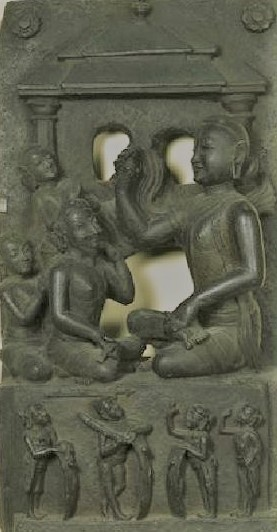
Narasingha Deva I listening to the wise sermons of his teacher along with his queens

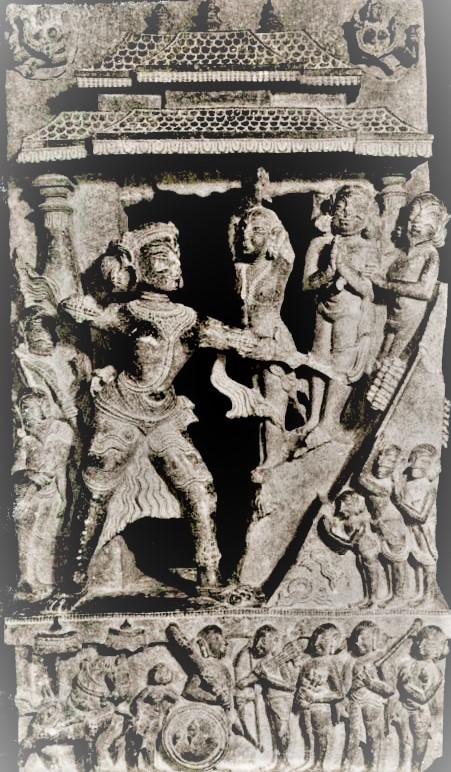
Broken stone panel from Konark ruins depicting Narasingha Deva I practicing flawless archery.

Narasingha Deva I is glorified in multiple phrases and sections of literary works by some of the poets of his time besides being eulogized in the inscriptions of Kendupatna, Asankhali, Kenduli, Sikhareswara Temple, Panjabi math and Sankarananda Math found in Odisha. Poet Dimdima Jivadeva Acharaya in his work "Bhakti Bhagbata Mahakavyam" has praised him as a renowned warrior who was the only one to have destroyed the invading Delhi Sultanate. Vidyadhara, the court poet of the king himself in his work 'Ekavali' has praised the king's army as a victorious force, the glory of which reached great heights while invoking sorrowfulness in the mind of the Delhi Sultan. Narasingha Deva I is described to have caused apprehension in the ranks of the Turco-Afghan forces of Delhi that would surrender when they saw him appear on the battlefield with his sword. Multiple armies of regional kingdoms (Gauda, Lata, Gurjara, Karnata, Malwa, etc.) are described to have been decisively defeated due to the strength of his army.

== Gajapati title ==
Narasingha Deva I was the first king of Kalinga to use the title of Gajapati (Lord of the elephants) which would become the imperial title of the ruling monarchs of Trikalinga and its later manifestation as the region of Odradesha. The title was first used in the 1246 CE inscription at Kapilash Temple.

== Conflicts with Mamluk dynasty in Bengal ==
Narasimha Deva was victorious against the Muslim rulers of Mamluk dynasty in Bengal that had captured Bihar and Bengal. He not only repulsed their attacks, but pushed them as far back as Padma River in current-day Bangladesh. According to the Sanskrit work of Ekavali of the poet Vidydhara, Narasingha Deva I's military achievements against the Muslim forces are decorated with titles such as "Yavanabani Ballabha" meaning conqueror of Yavana or Muslim kingdom and "Hamira Mada Mardana" meaning vanquisher of the Muslim Amirs of Bengal. After his accession in 1238 CE, Narasimha I followed the policy of aggressive imperialism. By that time, Tughril Tughan Khan (1233 – 1246 CE) had become the governor of Bengal as a vassal of the Delhi Sultanate.

After ascending the throne of Kalinga, Narasingha Deva marched with his grand army, aided by Paramadrideva, who was his Haihaya brother-in-law, towards Bengal in the years 1242–1243 CE. Even when the Odia army reached the Bengal region, a number of semi-independent Hindu rajas of Saptagram and Nadia District didn't oppose as the Odishan army was only safeguard against the rapacity of the Turks. The Odia Army made a calculated move to northern Rarh, Gauda and Varendra, the subordinate territory of the Delhi Sultanate. At this juncture, Tughril Tughan gave a clarion call to all the Muslims for a jihad (holy war) against the Hindus. Even a Qazi (Muslim holy man) and chronicler by the name Minhaj-us-Siraj accompanied this holy war by the Muslims against the invading Hindus from the Odisha frontier.

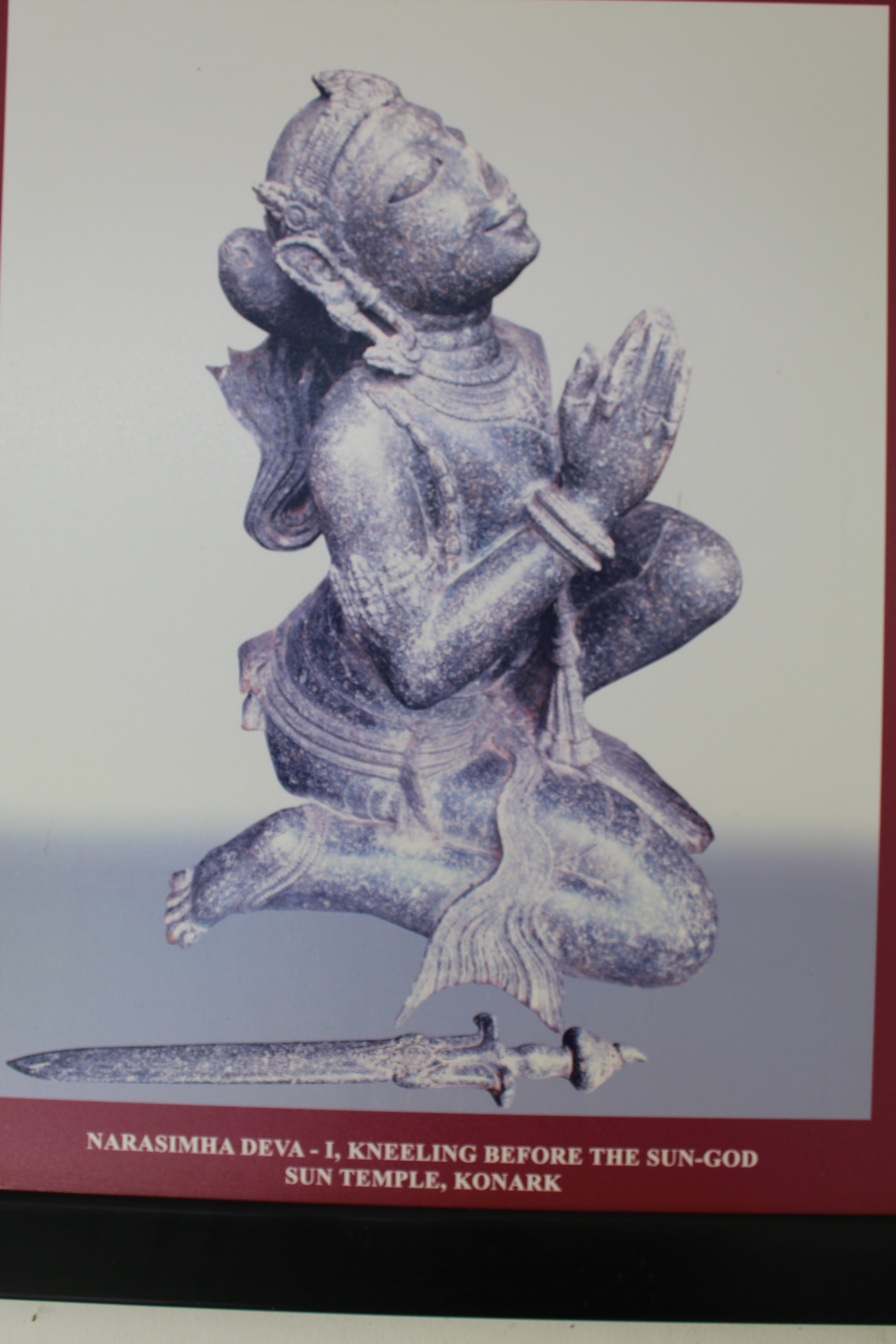
Image of Langula Narasingha Deva at Konark Sun Temple depicting him kneeling at the feet of the Hindu deity Surya (Sun)

It is certainly a fact that Narasingha Deva I had extended his sway up to Rarh by defeating Tughril-Tughan Khan. He intended to extend his sway up to Varendra by repeatedly invading it. By that time, Lakhnauti consisted of two main divisions- Rarh and Varendra, situated on either side of the Ganges. Lakhnor was the headquarters of Muslim expansionist operations in Bengal, consisting mainly of Rarh and Varendra subdivisions under direct authority of the Delhi Sultanate. Having his sway over Rarh and southern parts of Gauda, Narasingha Deva I, directed his army against Varendra. The Odishan army ransacked the Muslim territory at Bengal and created panic in the minds of the Muslims. Being fearful, Tughril Tughan Khan appealed to Sultan Alauddin Masud Saha of Delhi to come to his rescue; the Sultan sent Quamuruddin Tamur Khan, the governor of Oudh to help Tughan Khan. However, after reaching Bengal, Tamur had a sharp difference of opinion with Tughril Tughan, who was ultimately driven away from Bengal and Tamur Khan continued as its governor till his death in 1246 CE.

=== First seizure of Lakhnauti or Battle of Katasin (Contai) (1243 CE) ===
In the initial phase of the expedition, a siege was laid on the fort of Lakhnauti which was a strategic point of entrance into the territory of the Mamluks Muslims from the west and also a point of communication with other Muslim-dominated kingdoms of North India, especially the Delhi Sultanate. In his work known as Tabaqat-i-Nasiri, chronicler Minhaj-I-Siraj Juzani, who accompanied the Muslim forces, gives live accounts and a vivid picture of the war. By 1244 CE, Tughril Tughan launched a counterattack on the invading Odia army. Gaining some initial success, the Muslim army followed the forces of Narasingha Deva who were on a tactical retreat at this point towards the frontier fort of Katasin (Contai in the Southern part of today's West Bengal) that was surrounded by jungles and thick cane-bushes and provided a strategic defence. The Odia army had dug trenches to force the advancing Muslim cavalry to slow down and halt, and also left some of their elephants unattended along with fodder in open field to lure the advancing enemies and expose them to capture.

After the initial defensive confrontation, the Odia forces followed guerrilla warfare tactics, initially staying hidden from the vision of the approaching Muslim forces. In the middle of the raging battle, a retreating Odia force led Tughral Tughan to believe that the Odia army had left the area and halted the army in ease who in turn settled down for midday meals. A sudden and unprecedented attack was launched by the forces of Narasingha Deva, ensuring a massive slaughter of the enemy forces. According to the Minhaj, a section of the massive Hindu army charged from the direction of the fort, while a concealed detachment of 200 soldiers, 50 horsemen and 5 elephants pounced on the unsuspecting Bengal Muslim army of Tughan, emerging from the thick cane bushes behind the camp. Several Muslims soldiers were killed in this attack and Tughan himself had a narrow escape with his life and was possibly wounded. The march of Narasingha Deva I's forces over the Muslim army has been described in the Ananta Vasudeva temple inscription. In a dramatic description of these events of slaughtering of a whole Muslim army by the Odia forces, the descendant of Langula Narasingha Deva, Narasingha Deva II in his Sanskrit bronze inscription of Kendupatna, mentioned;

"Radha Varendra Yabani Nayanjanaasru,

Pureya Dur Binibesita Kalima Srihi,

Tadh Bipralamm Karayadrabhuta Nistaranga,

Gangapi Nunamamuna Yamunadhunavut"

Which means-

The Ganga herself blackened for a great extent by the flood of tears which washed away the collyrium from the eyes of the Yavanis [Muslim women] of Radha and Varendra [west and north Bengal] whose husbands have been killed by Narasimha's army.

Second seizure of Lakhnauti

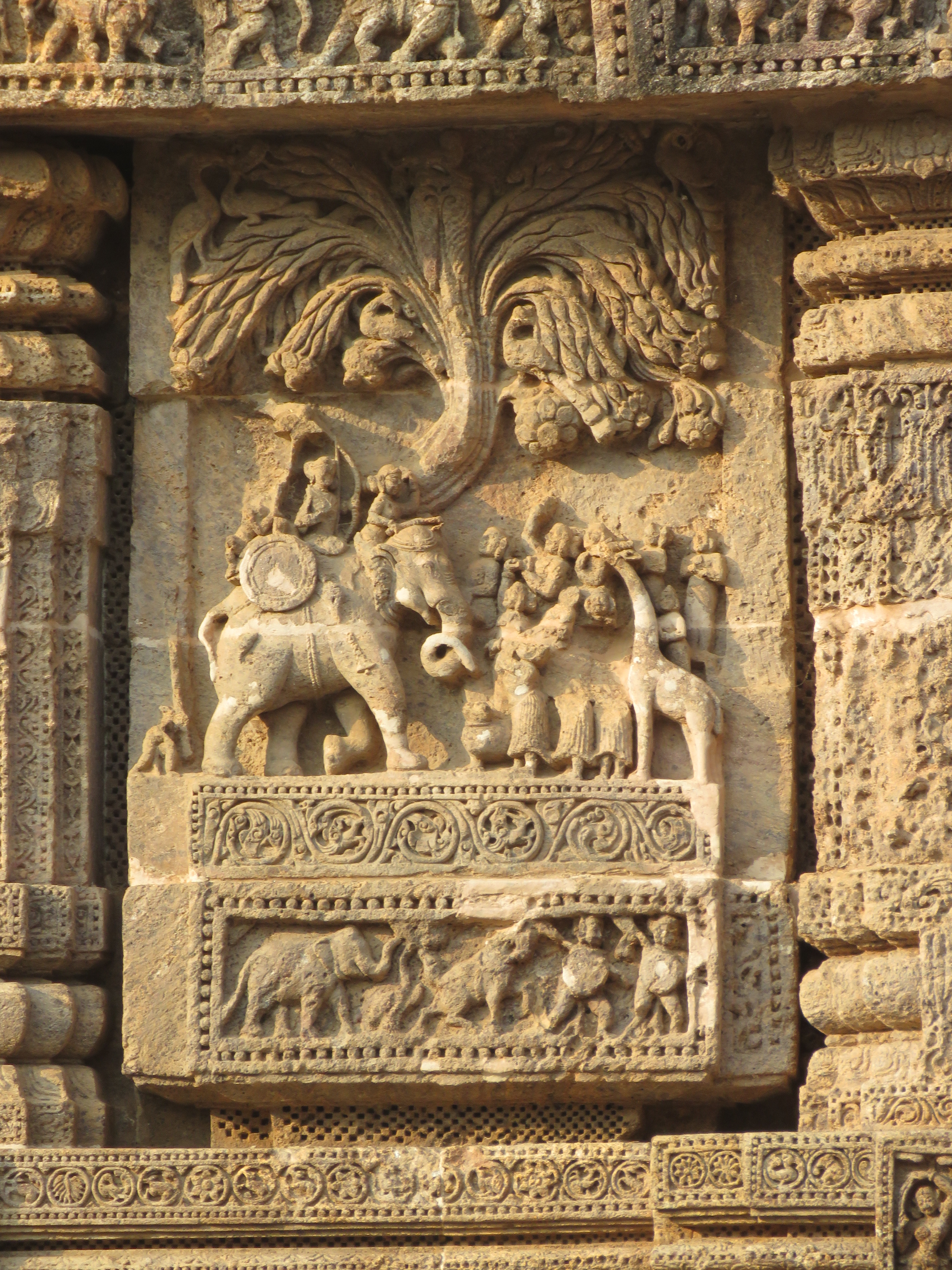
Sculpture at Konark depicting Narasingha Deva I seated atop a war elephant and being presented with a giraffe by some African merchants

In 1244 CE, the victorious Odia forces again seized two provinces of Varendra and Rarh situated side by side on the river Ganga and surrounded the Lakhnauti fort. The Muslim commander of the Lakhnauti fort, Fakr-Ul-Mulk-Karimuddin-Laghri, was killed along with his detachment, who tried to battle with the Odia army in the open field. According to certain records, the two provinces of Bengal were ransacked and plundered by invading forces. Many battle weapons were also seized from the Muslim Bengal Army. The Muslim governor of Awadh and a vassal of the Delhi Sultanate, Qamruddin Tamur Khan arrived to rescue of Tughan Khan by the orders received from Delhi. Minhaj Juzani notes that on hearing the arrival of this large force from Awadh, the Odia forces left on the second day, which seems to be incorrect as he himself notes that a quarrel ensued between the two Muslim generals as Qamaruddin was enraged to see the Odia army surrounding the fort of Lakhnauti, which directly contradicts Minhaj's notes, as the Odia forces were still present by the time the Awadh reinforcements had already reached the fort. Further records on the successive events is missing from Tabaqat-I-Nisari. Tughan Khan was discharged from his governorship of Bengal by Qamruddin with the authority of the Delhi Sultanate. Qamruddin Tamur Khan himself assumed the governorship of Bengal after this incident.

== Battles of Umurdan (1247 to 1256 CE) ==
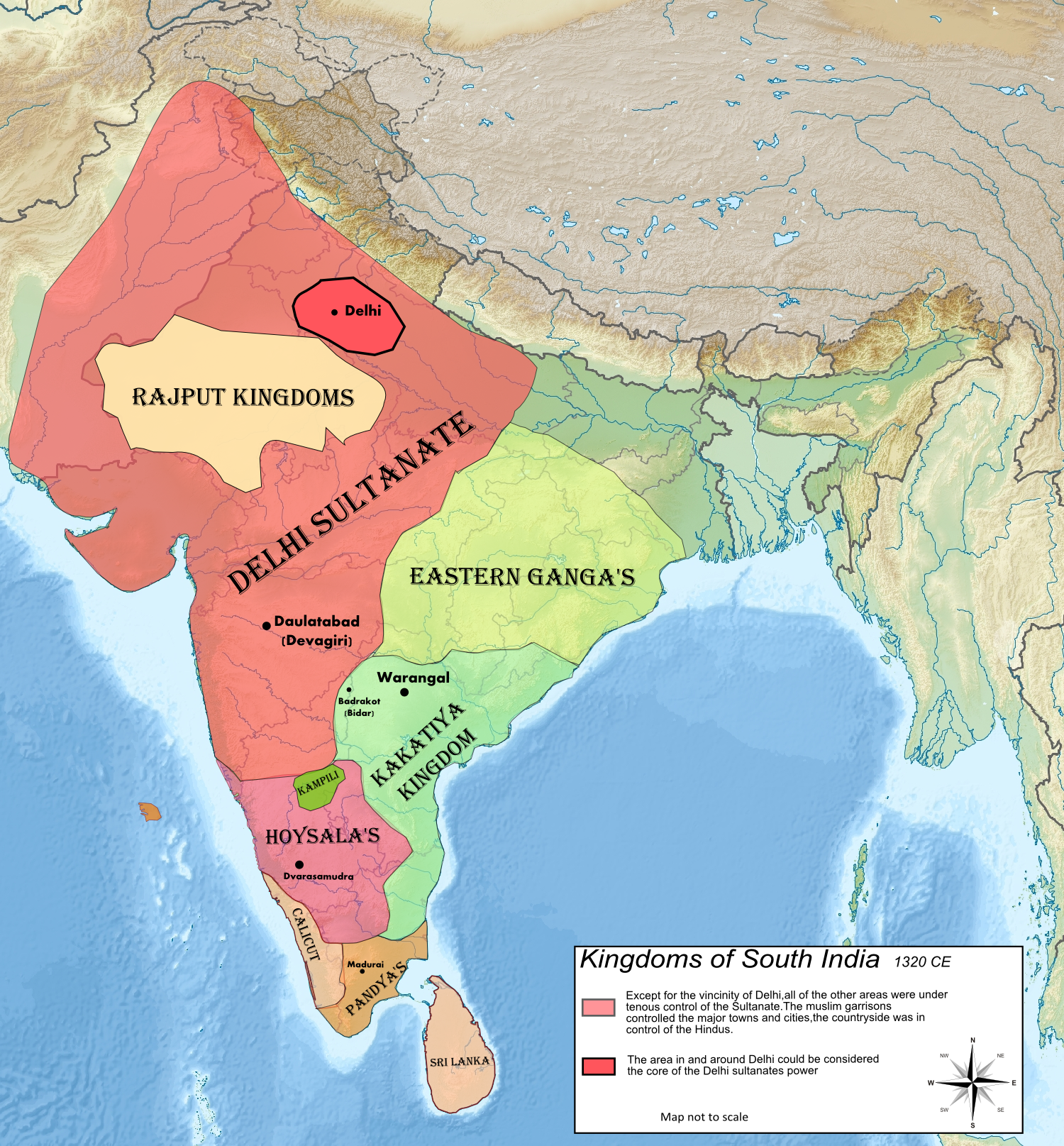
Eastern Gangas territory after Narsingha Deva I

In 1247 CE, an able new Muslim military commander, lkhtiyar-ud-Din Yuzbak, was appointed as the governor of Bengal with the primary task of freeing Bengal from the Odia forces of Langula Narasingha Deva that was commanded by his Haihaya brother-in-law, Paramardi Dev. The secondary task of the new governor was to suppress the rebellious activities of Tughan Khan who was plotting a revolt against the Delhi sultanate. Aided by the Delhi sultanate, the new governor launched a fresh military campaign against the Odia forces on the soil of Bengal. In his Tabaqat-i-Nasiri, Minhaj mentions that the two initial attempts to counter the Odia invasion were successful to an extent but eventually Savantar or Samantaray (commander) of the Odia forces, Paramardi Dev defeated the Muslim army. The Muslim army was again resupplied and reinforced by the Delhi Sultanate on the appeal of lkhtiyar, who marched further into the Odishan territory and a battle ensued at Mandarana or Umurdan in today's Jahanabad subdivision of Hoogly district. Paramadri Dev resisted but was killed on the battlefield. The Muslims halted their progress into Odisha fearing retaliation by the Odia forces.

Rarh and Gauda remained occupied by the Odia forces and the northern frontiers of Kalinga ruled by the Eastern Ganga Dynasty, expanded after these expeditions carried out by Narasingha Deva I while Varendra remained under secluded Mamluk authority. There is no record of any direct Muslim invasion of Odishan territory for at least the next hundred years, due to the aggressive military expeditions in Bengal by Narasingha Deva I.

== Conflict with Kakatiya ruler Ganapatideva ==
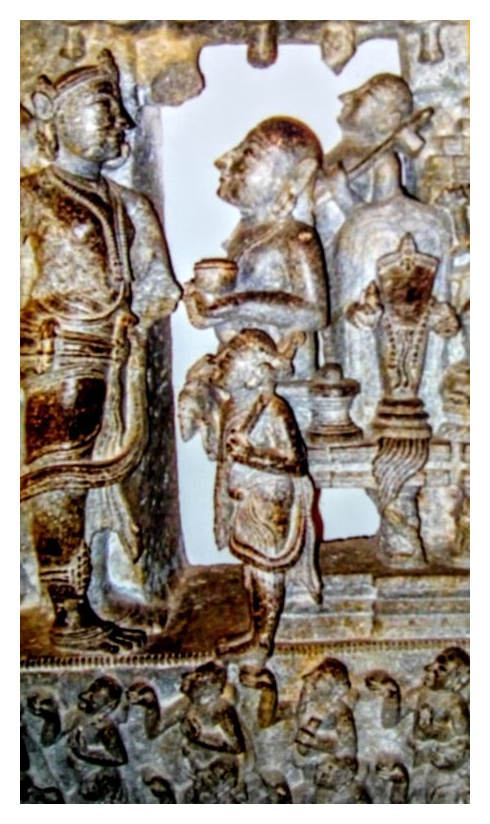
Detached Konark stone panel showing Brahmins asking for alms from Narasingha Deva I with the image of Jagannath visible in the background

The Kakatiya and Gangas conflict was prominent from the times of Narasingha Deva's father Ananga Bhima Deva III. The major territorial disputes were for the areas adjoining the Godavari River.

Ananga Bhima Deva III had captured the Vengi territories south of Godavari. Draksharama inscription of Kakatiya General Malyala Hemadi Reddy from the year 1237 CE show that they were able to conquer the territory north of Godavari.

In the Lingaraja temple inscription of Narasingha it is stated that he humbled the Kakatiya king Ganapati, but according to scholar Surya Narayan Das, it was Rudrama, the daughter of Ganapati who was defeated by him while the confusion prevailed for accession to the throne in the Kakatiya kingdom after the death of Ganapati.

The Lingaraja Temple Sanskrit Inscription of Narasingha Deva I states that-

"Sva-Kara-Karavala-Kampita-Ganapati-Bhu-Senapati

Gajabaji-Samaja -Rarajaja-Tanujatmaja-Sya

Marici-Parasara- Acara- Vicara- Caturaviranara-Kesari

Dharadhi-Pasya-Nyaya-Namra-Paripanthi-Prithlvipati

Kirita-Kotimani-Ghrni-Sreni-Bhiru-Nita-Pada

Saro Jasya-Samrajya-Bhiseka- Atrutha-Samvat-Sare"

== Architectural and cultural contributions ==
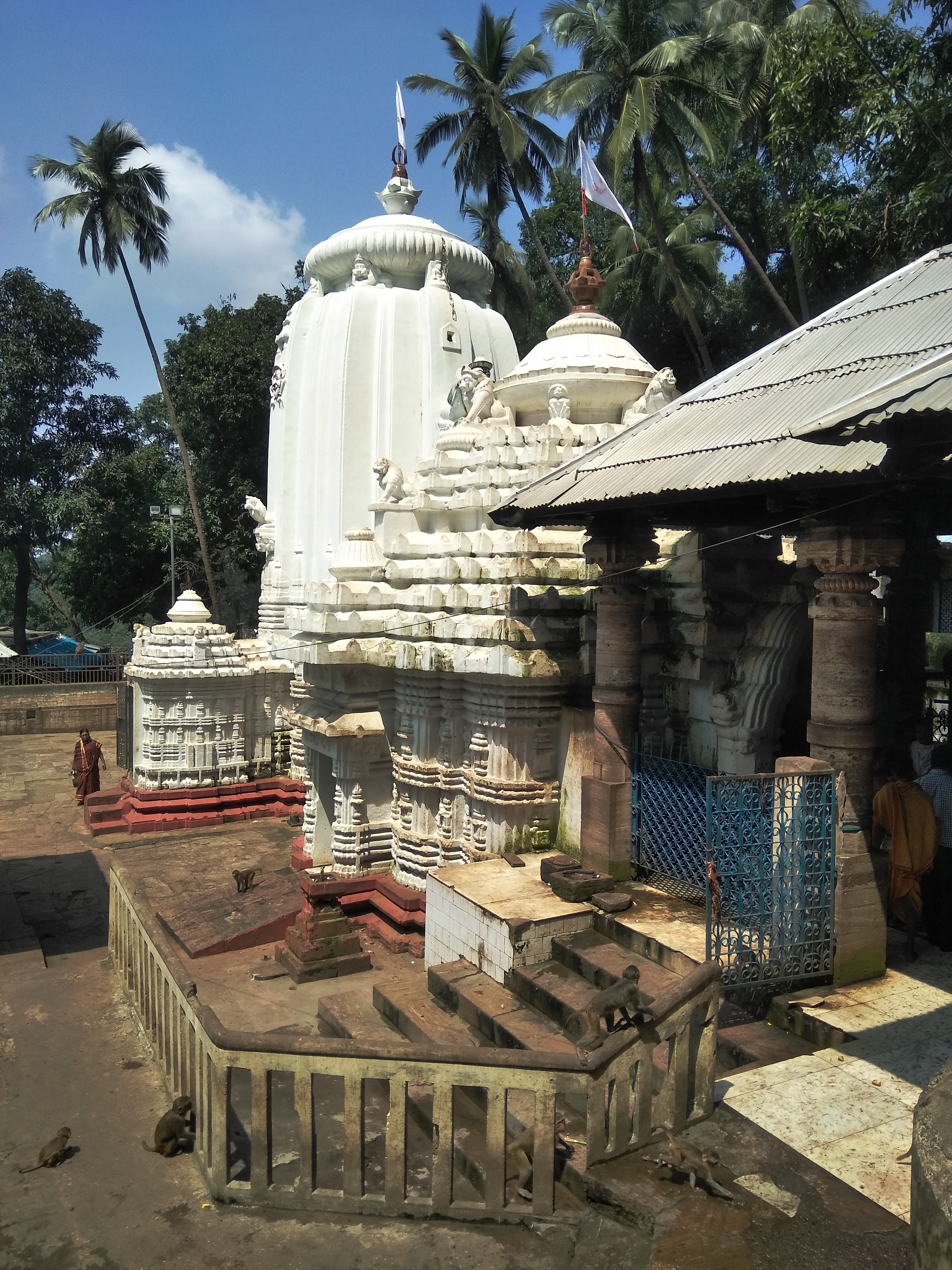
Kapilash temple in Dhenkanal constructed during Narasingha Deva I

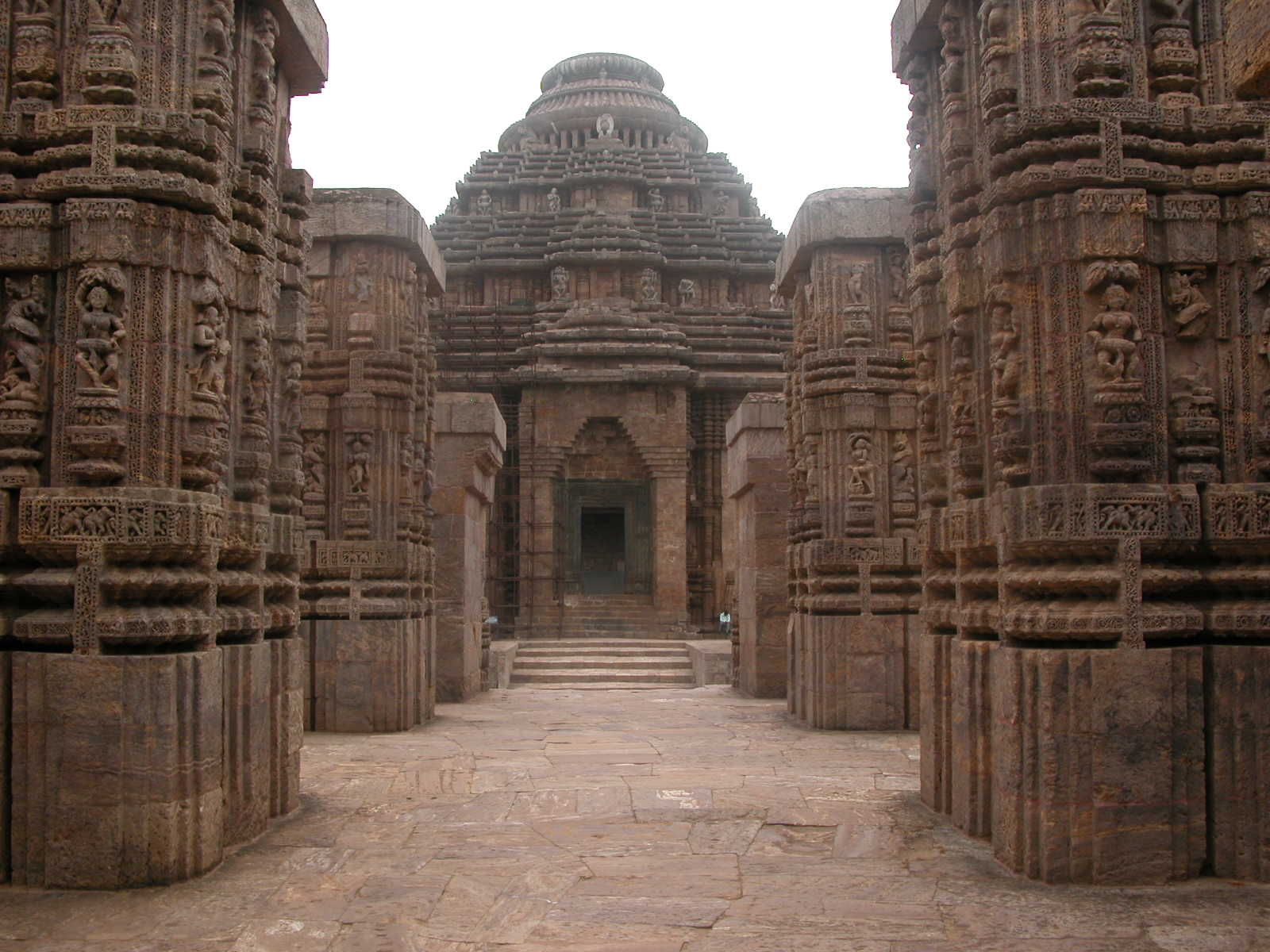
Ruins of Konark Sun temple constructed during Narasingha Deva I's reign

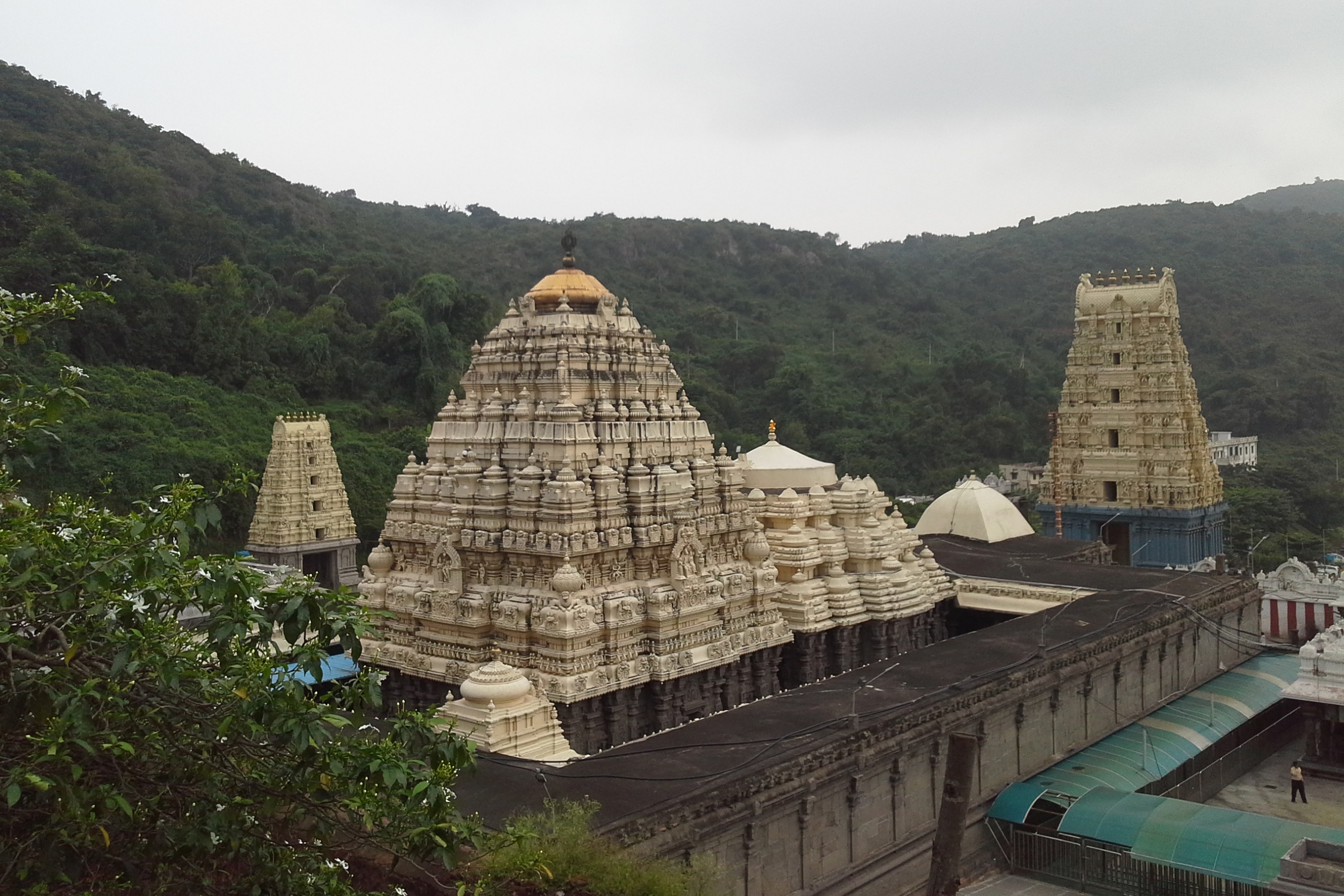
Simhachalam temple (specifically the inner sanctum) was built during the rule of Narasingha Deva I

Narasingha Deva I is mentioned as Paramamahesvara, Durga-Putra and Purushottamaputra in the Chandrashekhera temple inscription. The titles show that he was a protector and a follower of the Shaiva, Shakti and Jagannath sects during his rule. A sculpture from the Konark sun temple build by him shows bowing before the three lead deities of the sects as per his titles and a priest. The Lingaraj temple inscriptions says that he had constructed a Matha (monastery) called as Sadashiva Matha to give shelter to the fleeing refugees from Radha and Gauda after the incursion by Muslim forces there. According to the Srikurmam temple inscription, he was a sober person without any bad nature and agitation. He possessed valuable articles and was a sincere learner of art, architecture and religion.

He administered the state by the traditions of Marichi and Parasara while following the Niti sashtra (book of law). Due to his dedication towards faith and spirituality, he commissioned and completed the building projects for many temples like Konark, Kapilash, Khirachora Gopinatha, Srikurmam, Varaha Lakshmi Narasimha temple at Simhanchalam and Ananta Vasudeva temple which was built by the interest of his widowed sister, Chandrika. Sanskrit and Odia were both patronized as court languages during his rule and the Sanskrit masterpieces like Ekavali of Vidhydhara were written during this time. An inscription at Kapilash temple built by him compares him to the Varaha avatar (incarnation) of Vishnu who saved and raised the Vedas and the world from the oceans of uncertainty. He was the first king to use the title of 'Gajapati' or lord of war elephants among the Odishan kings.

=== Forts ===
- Raibania fort

=== Temples ===
- Konark Sun Temple
- Chandrashekhar Temple, Kapilash
- Ananta Vasudeva Temple, Bhubaneswar
- Khirachora Gopinatha Temple, Balasore
- Kurmanathaswamy Temple, Srikurmam
- Varaha Lakshmi Narasimha Temple, Simhachalam
- Chudakhia Somanath Temple at Khurda's Budhapada locality.
- Chitrakarini Temple
- Narasimhanath, Nuasasana, Pipili, Puri
- Gangeswari Temple
- Gopinath Dev Temple

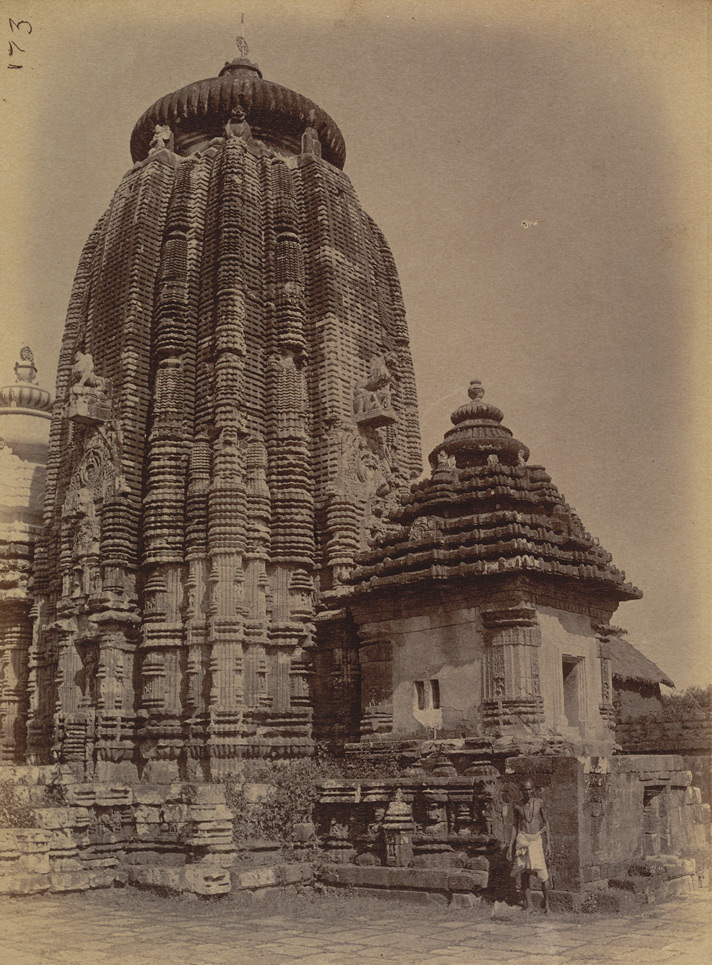
Ananta vasudeva temple, Bhubaneswar

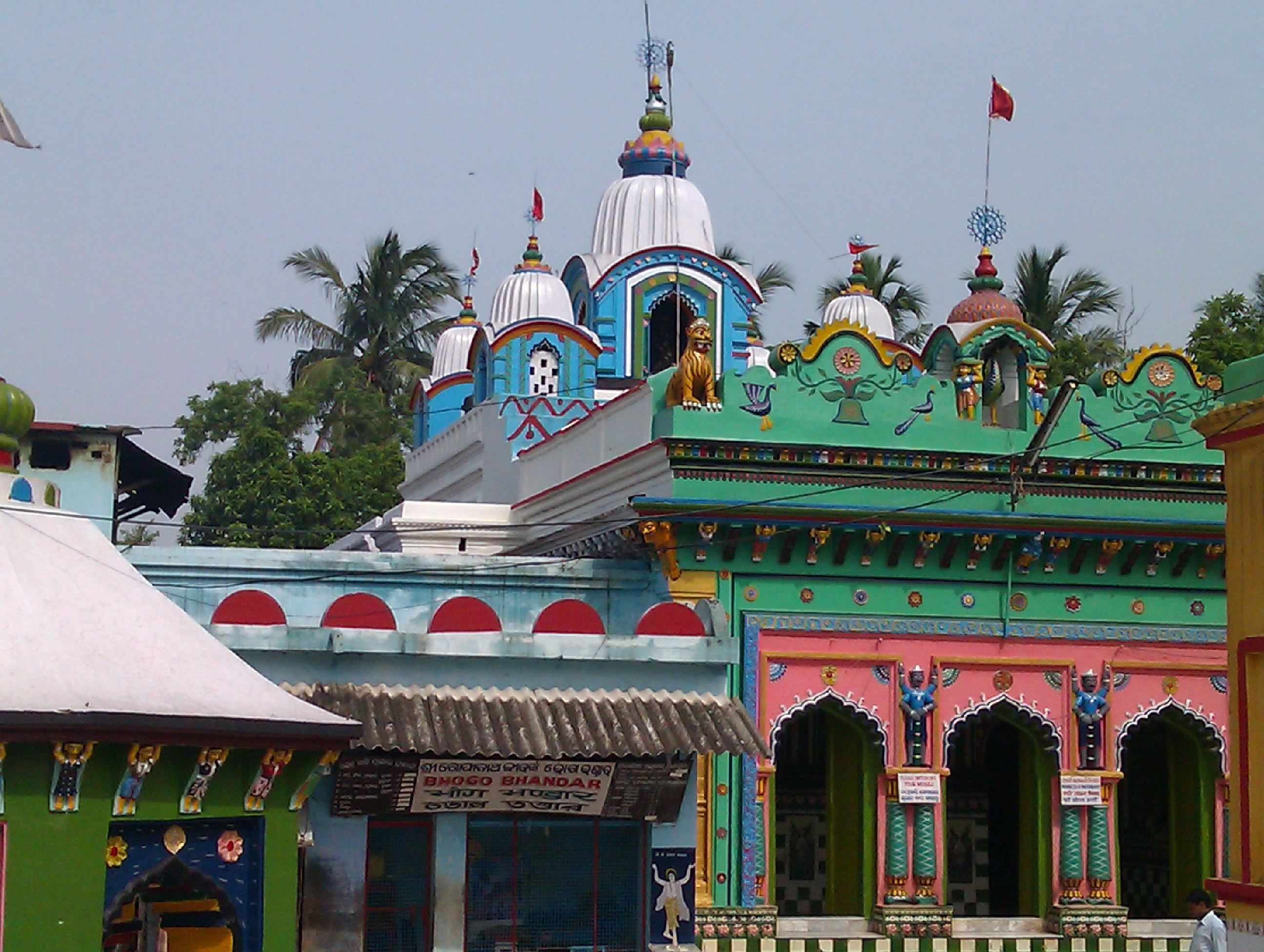
Khirachora Gopinatha Temple, Remuna

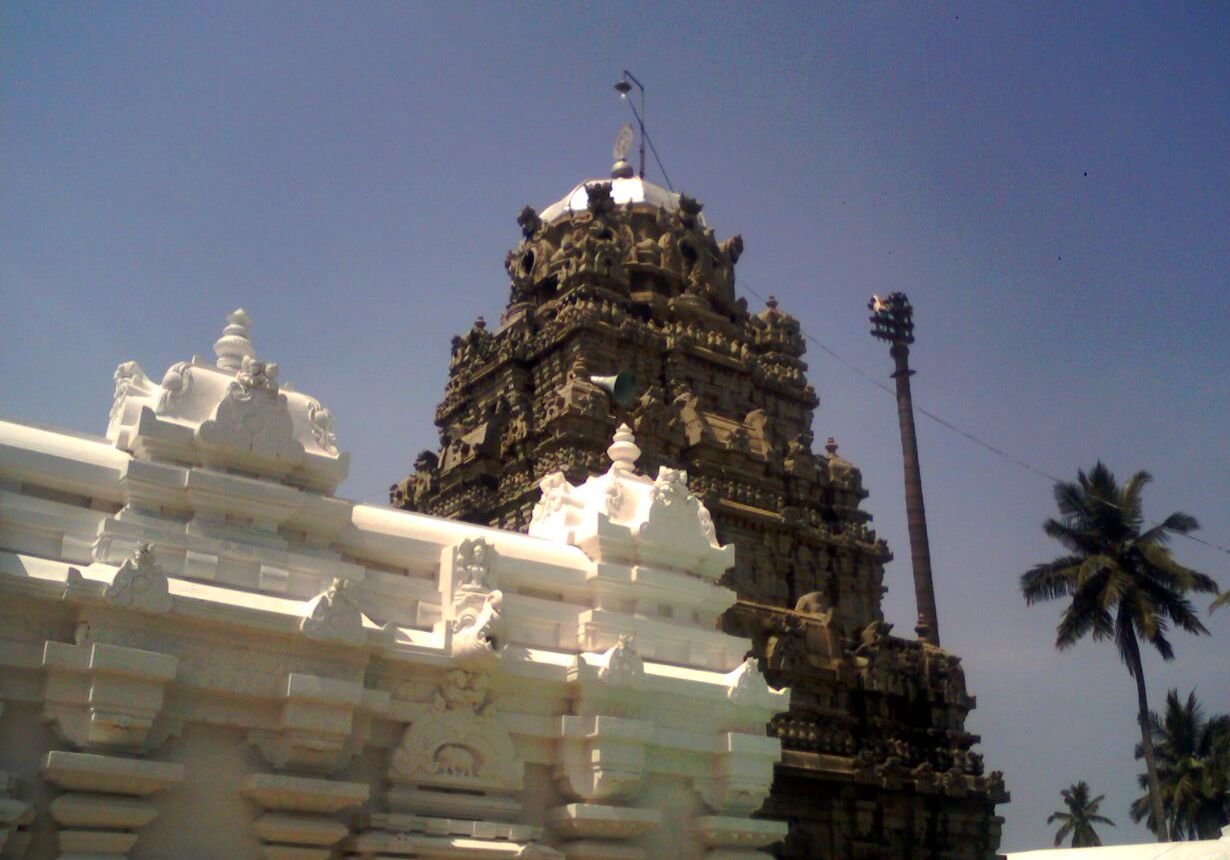
Srikurmam Temple, Srikakulam

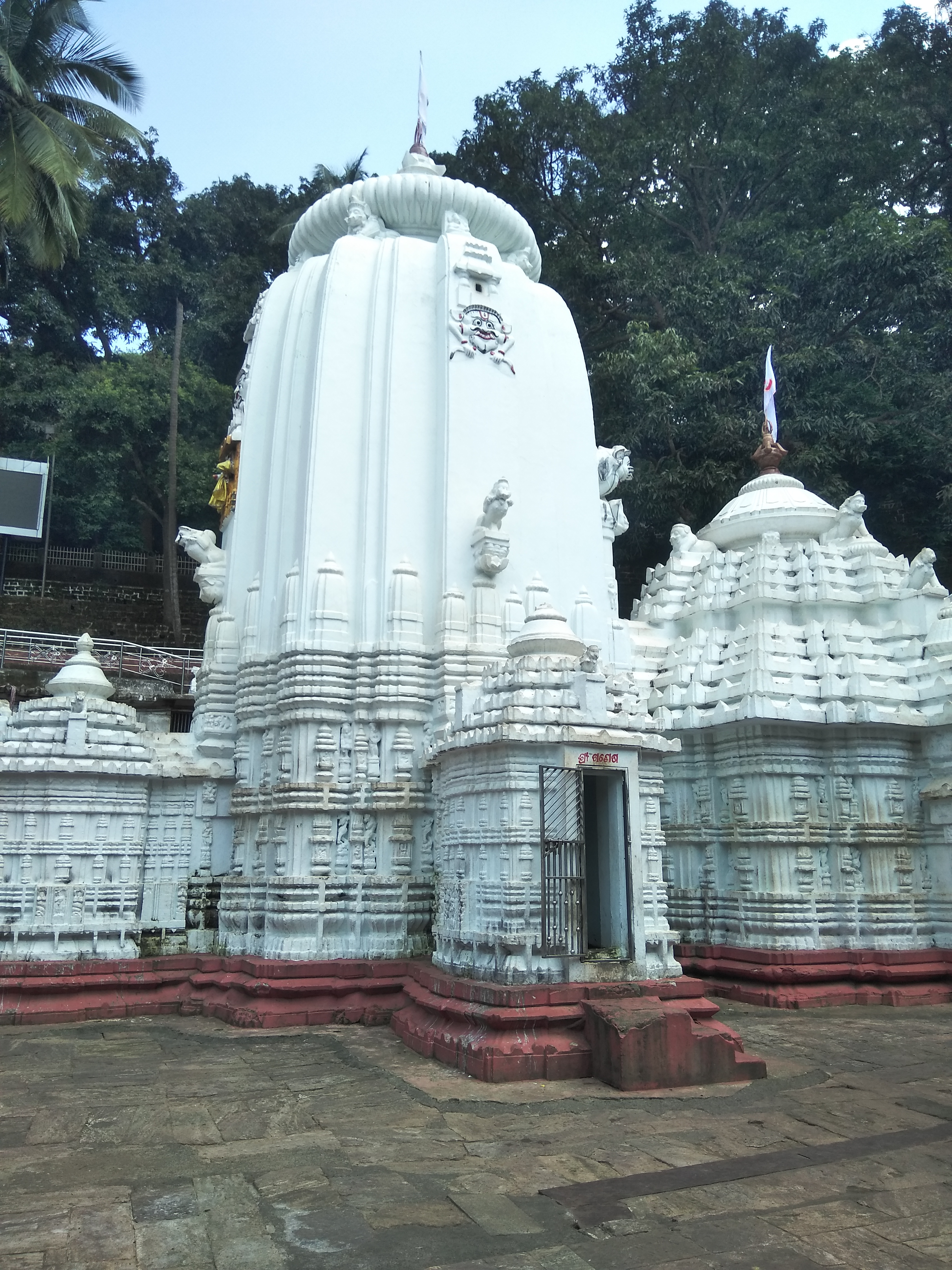
Chandrasekhar Temple, Kapilash

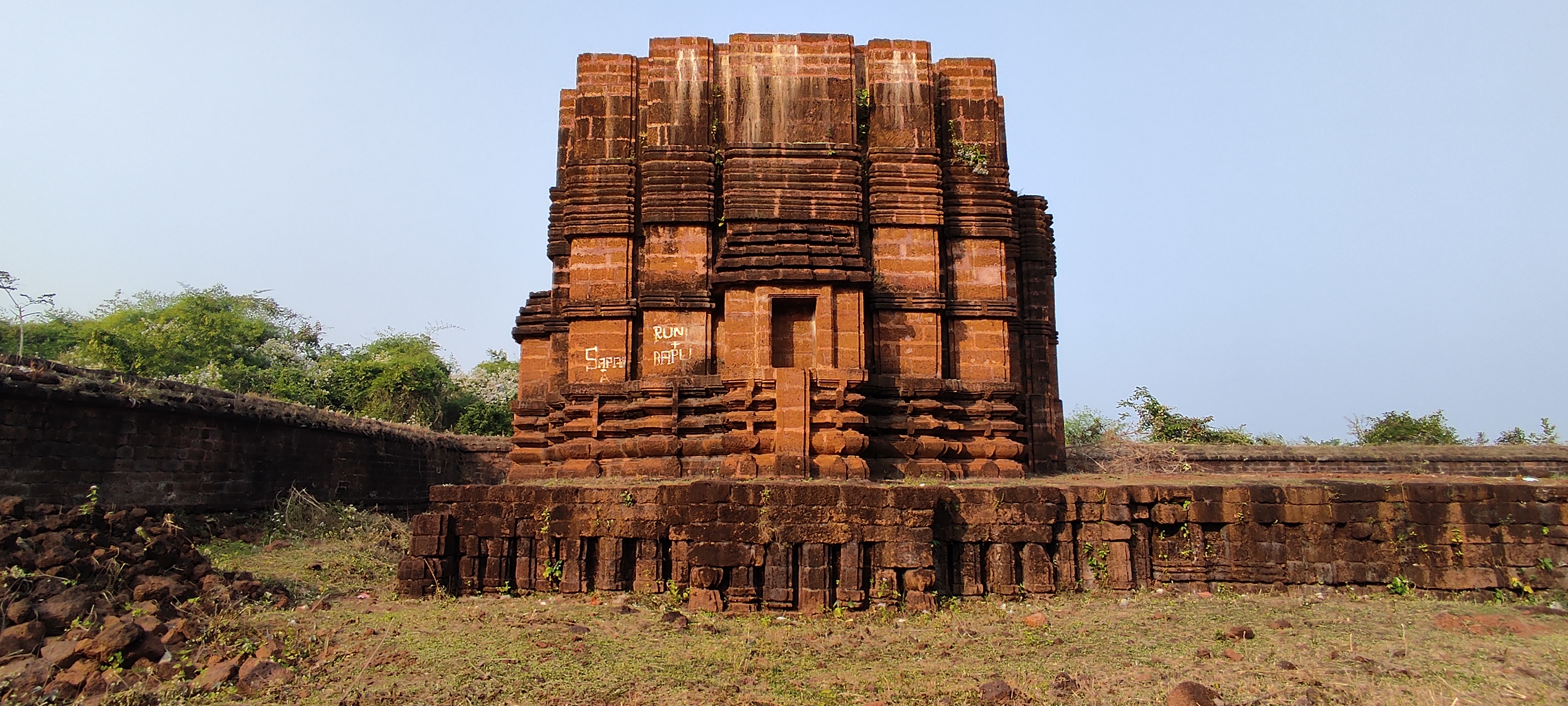
Raibania fort, Balasore

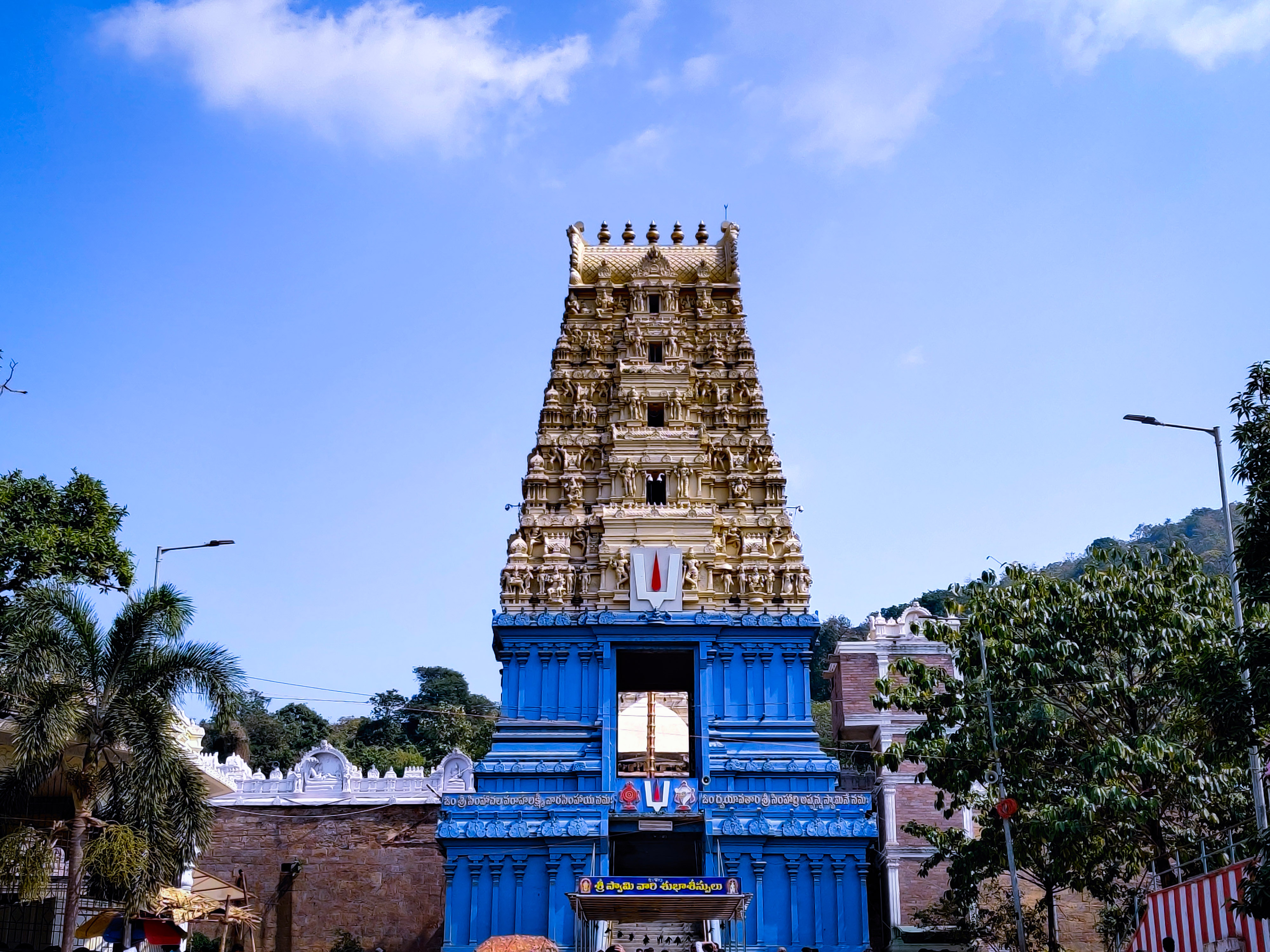
Varaha Lakshmi Narasimha Temple, Simhachalam

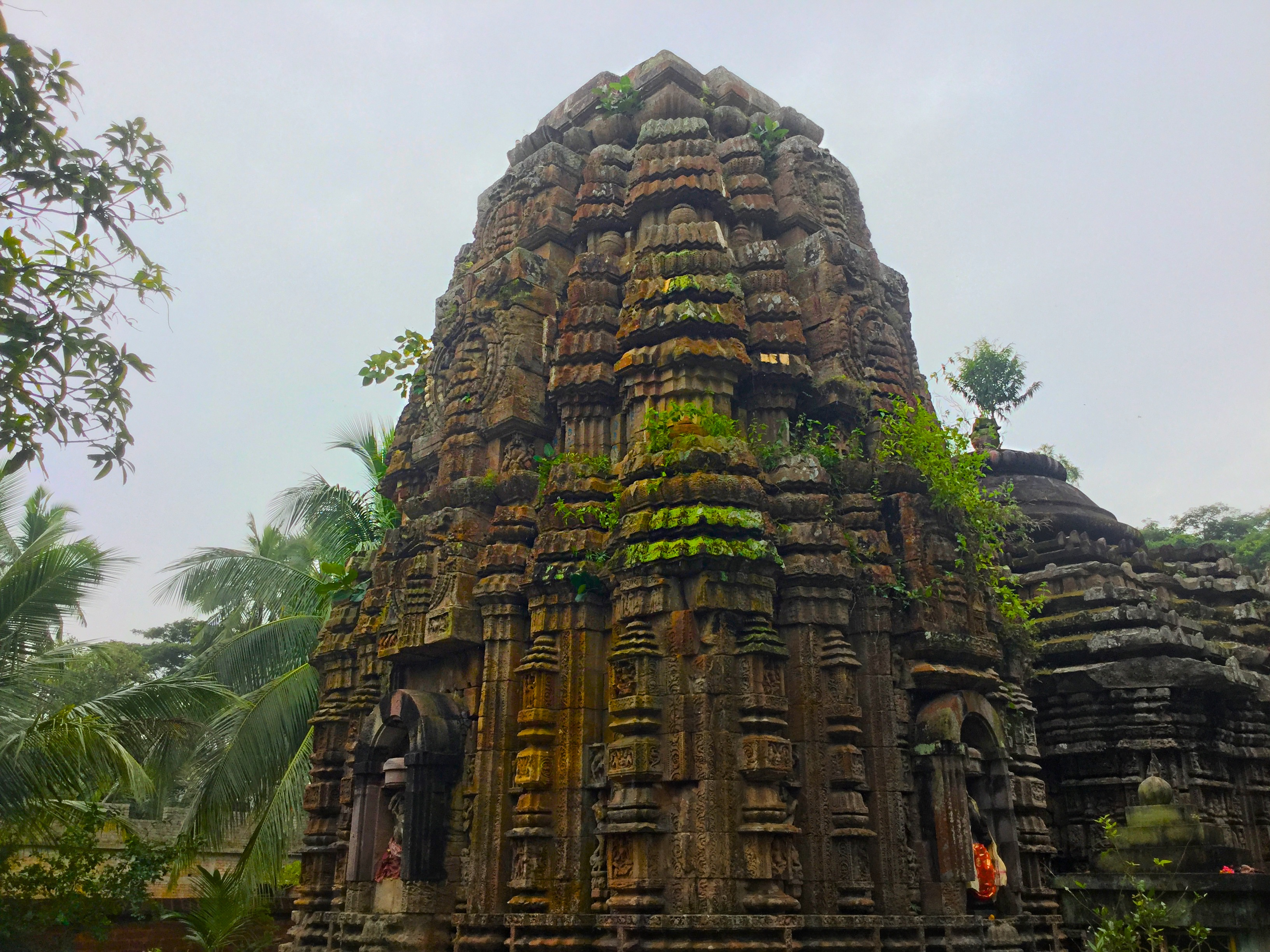
Gangeswari Temple, Puri

=== The Legend of Dharmapada and Twelve Hundred Masons of Konark ===
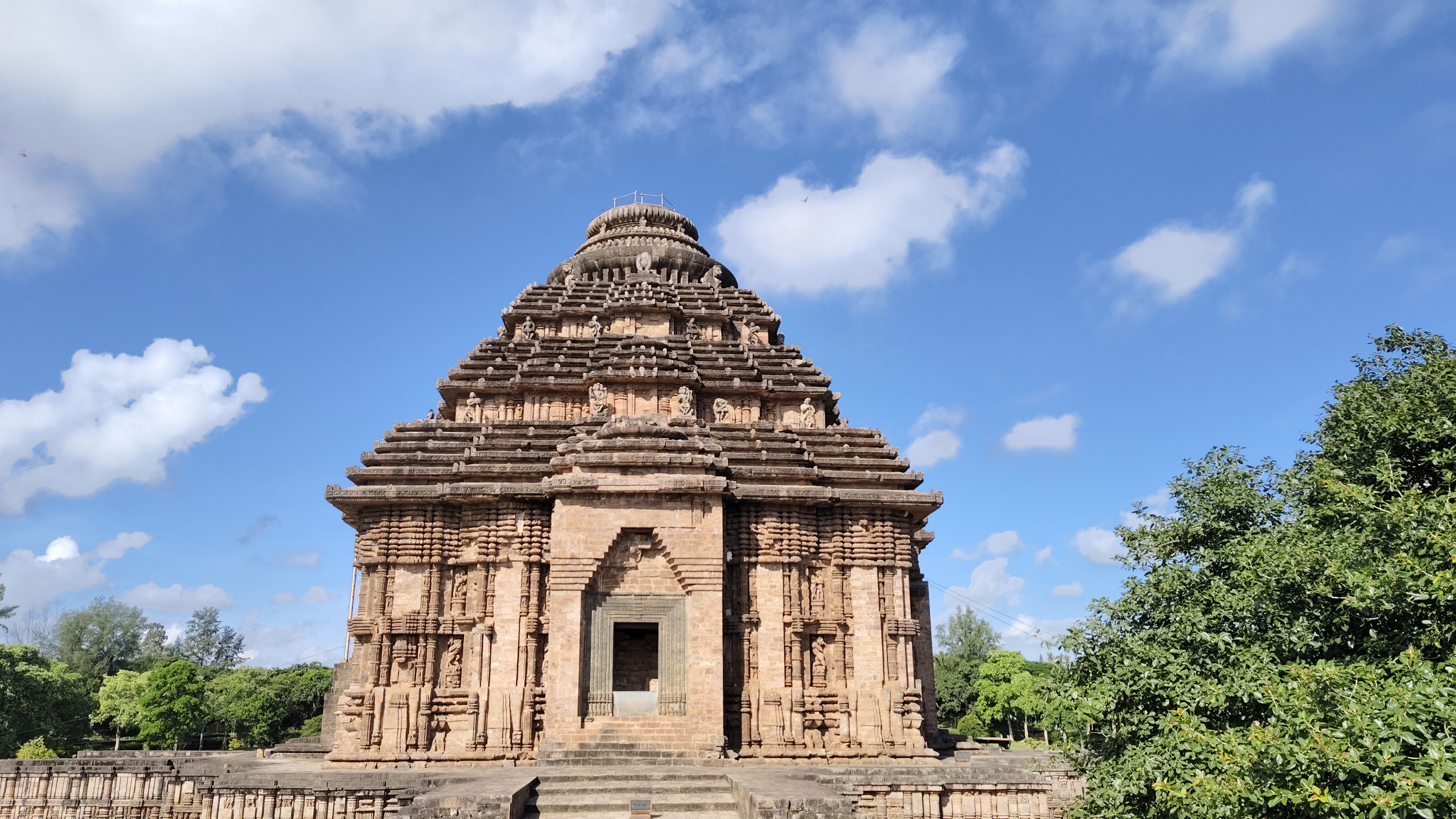
The Konark Sun Temple Construction Commissioned by Gajapati Narasingha Deva I

A popular Odia legend exists to this day, regarding the construction of the Konark Sun Temple that was commissioned by Narasingha Deva I. As per the legend, 1200 head Badhei (masons) led by a leading sculptor named Bishu Maharana, were given the primary task to complete the project within twelve years over twelve acres of land corresponding to the legend of Samba who was cured from leprosy by the boon of Sun god Surya at the same spot after praying for twelve years. Due to delays, the project was not completed by the end of twelfth year as the uppermost portion of Kalasha did not fit in the almost completed structure. Enraged by the delays and doubting the competence of the masons, the king ordered the completion of the task by the next day morning or else all 1200 of them would be beheaded. On the very day a twelve-year-old son, named Dharmapada, had arrived to meet his father Bishu Maharana whom he had not seen since he was born, as Bishu was assigned to the project before that and had never visited his family during the course of the construction. Unable to put the Kalasha on the top of the temple due to the weight of their bodies, the masons feared the worst. The small child somehow undertook this task and managed to place the Kalasha on the top of the temple hence completing the task. As the orders were very specific for the assigned masons to finish the task, the news of a child completing the task would have still ensured their deaths. Realizing the situation, Dharmapada killed himself by jumping into the adjoining sea. This sacrifice by a twelve-year-old saved his father and all the other masons as Narasingha Deva I, on learning about the consequences of his severe orders, was resentful and spared their lives.

=== Historical Context and Alternative Perspectives on The Legend of Dharmapada Story ===
The legend of Dharmapada, a young boy who is said to have sacrificed his life to protect the twelve hundred masons working on the Konark Sun Temple, has no known historical reference before the 19th century. The story was first popularized by Utkalamani Gopabandhu Das, who wrote about the boy's sacrifice out of fear of the king's wrath in his literary works, particularly in the poem Dharmapadara Atmalipi, found in his book Bandira Atmakatha (translated as 'The Autobiography of a Prisoner'). While the story adds an emotional dimension to the temple's construction, no historical evidence corroborates its authenticity. Many scholars view it as a later mythological addition, likely intended to emphasize devotion, sacrifice, and the immense craftsmanship associated with the temple's construction.

An alternative historical perspective suggests that the artisans who built the Konark Sun Temple made a manasika (sacred vow) to Lord Somanatha. They pledged to construct a temple in his honor if their work at Konark was completed without any misfortune. After successfully completing the Sun Temple, they presented this vow to King Langula Narasingha Deva, who honored their devotion and granted them permission to build the Budhapada Somanatha Temple. This account challenges the idea of an inauspicious event occurring at Konark, as such an event would have contradicted the artisans’ vow and likely prevented the construction of the Somanatha temple. This act not only demonstrates the artisans' religious commitment but also highlights the benevolent character of the king, contrary to the image portrayed in the Dharmapada legend.

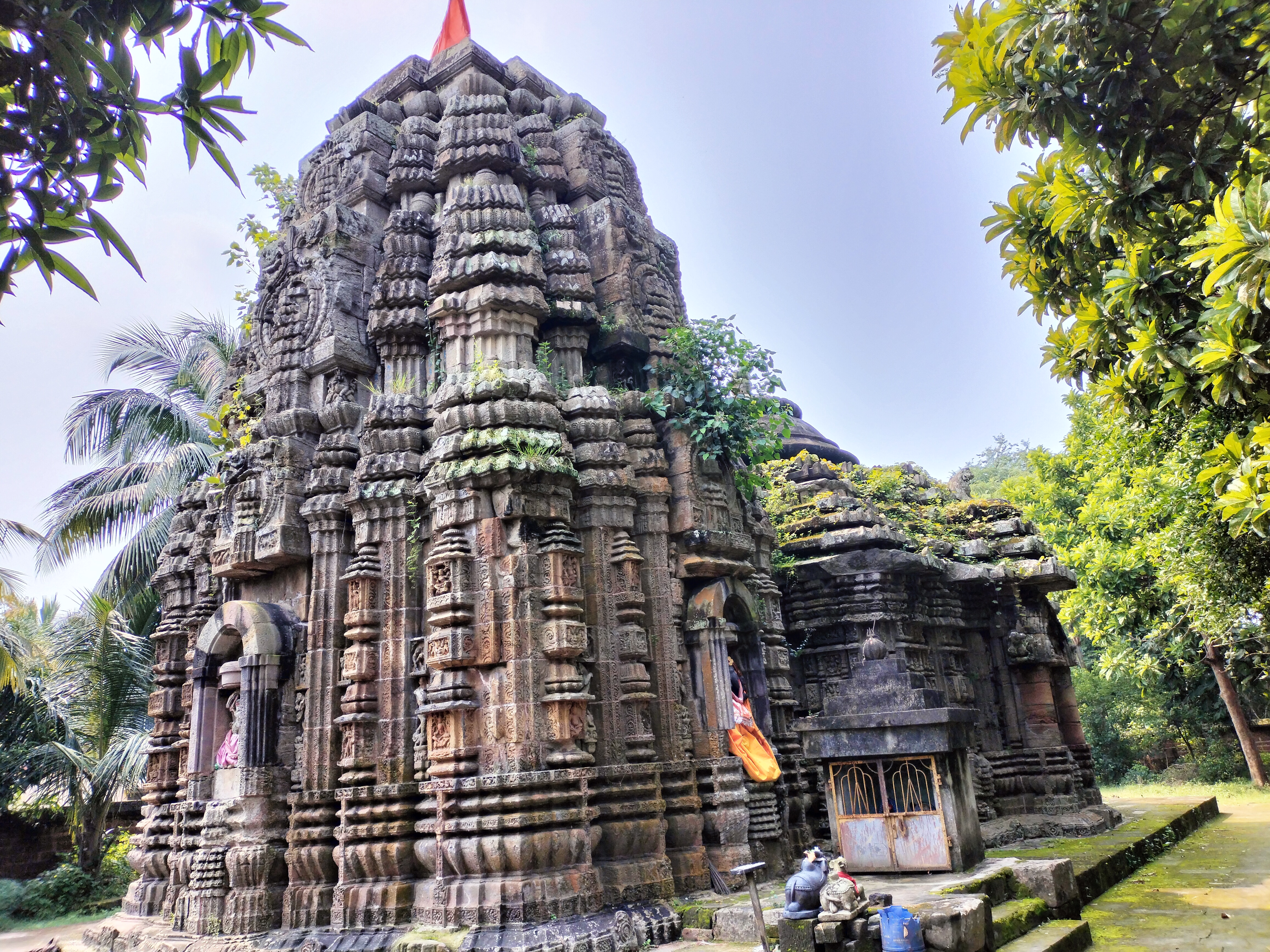
Gangeswari Temple, Puri

Furthermore, local accounts suggest that the Gangeswari Temple served as a prototype or demonstration site where artisans showcased their architectural skills to the king before embarking on Konark's construction. It is also believed that artisans lived near the Gangeswari Temple and worked on its construction at night while dedicating their days to building Konark.

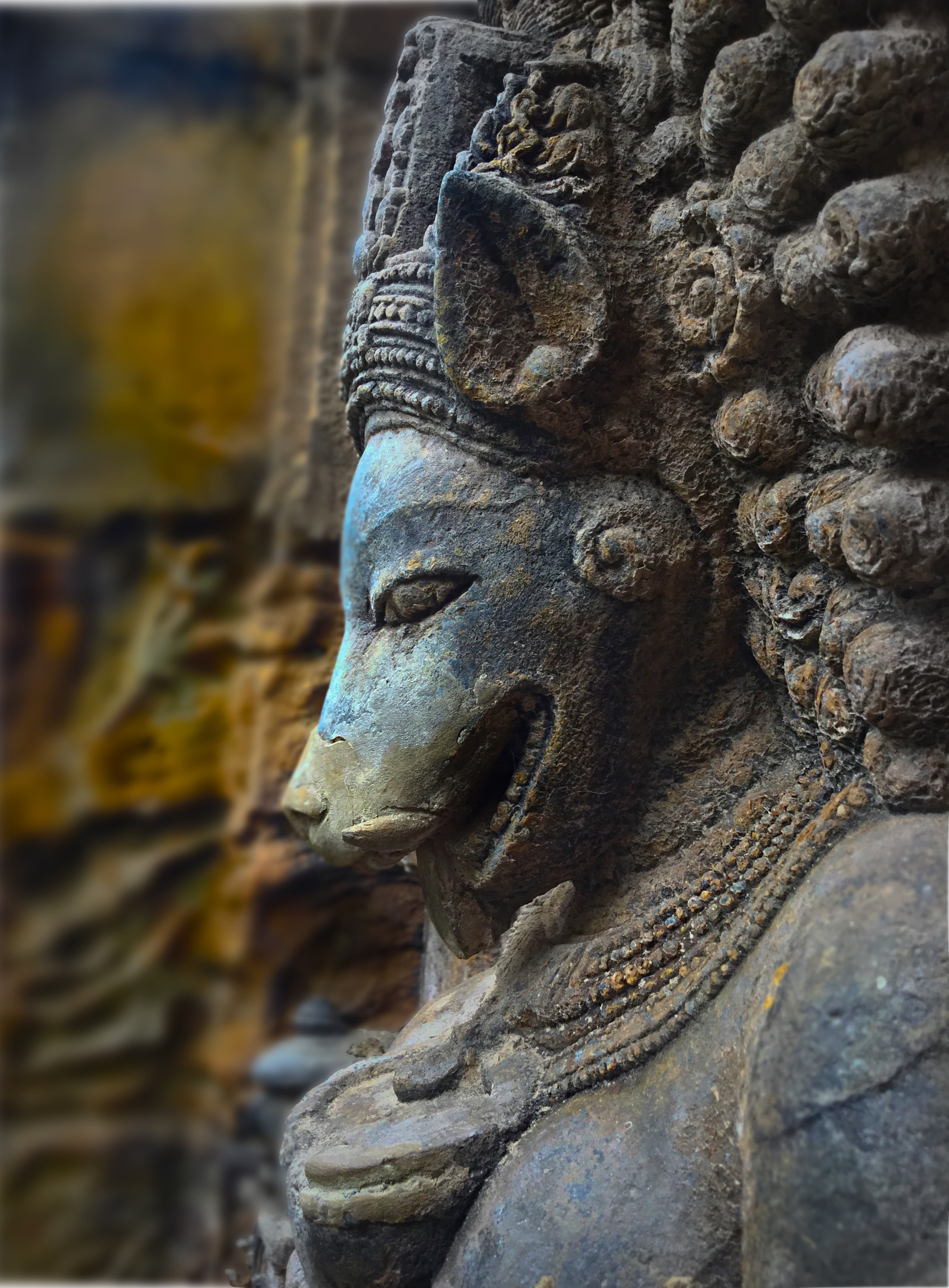
Close-up of Barahi (Varahi) sculpture in one of the parshwa-debata niches at the Gangeswari Temple in Bayalisabati. She is depicted licking off blood or wine from a bowl.

These details not only challenge the veracity of Dharmapada's tale but also shed light on King Langula Narasingha Deva's character as a benevolent ruler who supported his artisans and respected their wishes. The irony lies in how this legend tarnishes the image of a king who commissioned Konark as a symbol of cultural resilience against invading forces that threatened Odishan heritage.

== Historical impact ==
Langula Naraingha Deva rule came at critical juncture for political backlashes in eastern India. He was able to capitalize over the military achievements of his father and became a uniquely aggressive monarch of his era dictating ancient Odisha's military might over eastern India and defending the parts of Central India and the Eastern coast from the invading foreign Turkic forces who had almost subdued all the independent dynastic rulers across India with ease after the fall of Delhi's ruler Prthiviraj Chauhan in the Second Battle of Tarain in 1192 AD. Due to his aggressive military policies and strategic decisions, the Gangas were able to establish a complete independent state with a powerful military presence. Not until the next two and half a centuries would the Muslim forces be successful in threatening the borders of ancient Odisha or greater Kalinga. Due to this extended period of peace, tranquillity and presence of military might; religion, trade, literature and art flourished and attained new heights. The tradition of worshipping Jagannath was absorbed by every Odia household.

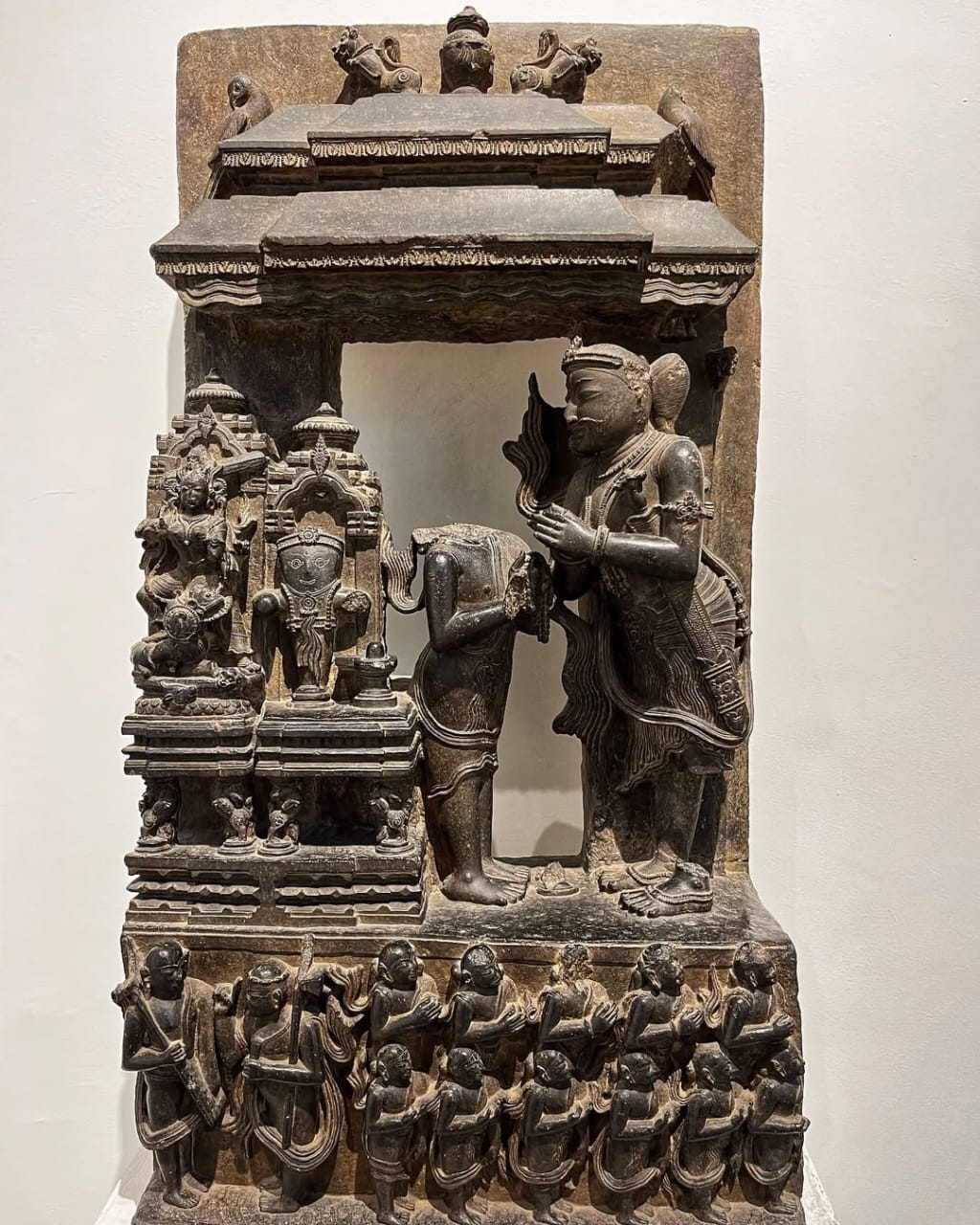
King Narasimha deva worshipping goddess Katyayini, Lord jagannatha and Lord Shiva.

Numerous magnificent temples were constructed in this era, beginning with the Eastern Gangas, one of the most remarkable initial rulers of which was Langula Narasingha Deva. The Sanskrit poet Vidhyadhara treats him as a great hero in his work Ekavali. Langula is glorified as a devotee of the goddess Shakti by describing him as a devotee of Katyayani. Eastern Ganga copper plate grants treat him as the son of Bhavani. He continued the worship of the holy triad like his father combining the three important deities of Odisha at the time, i.e., Purushottama Jagannahta, Lingaraja Siva and Viraja Durga. Multiple sculptures found in Konark and Jagannath Temple depict the combined worship of all the three sects.

== See also ==
- Eastern Ganga dynasty
- Western Ganga dynasty
- Konark Sun Temple
- History of Orissa
- List of rulers of Orissa
- List of wars involving India
- List of Hindu Empires and Dynasties
