= Narasimham =

Narasimham may refer to:

== People ==
- Challagalla Narasimham (fl. 1947–1986), Indian civil servant and author
- Chilakamarti Lakshmi Narasimham (1867–1946), Indian playwright and novelist
- M. Narasimham (1927–2021), Indian banker
  - Narasimham Committee on banking sector reforms
- Nishtala Appala Narasimham (1922–2002), Indian spectroscopist
- Pethakamsetti Appala Narasimham (1938–2009), Indian parliamentarian
- Thota Narasimham (born 1962), Indian politician

== Other uses ==
- Narasimham (film), a 2000 Indian Malayalam-language film starring Mohanlal

== See also ==
- Narasimha, a Hindu god
- Narasimha (disambiguation)
- Narasimhan (disambiguation)
