= Narasimhan =

Narasimhan is a surname. Notable people with the surname include:

- Laxman Narasimhan, Indian businessman, CEO of Starbucks
- M. S. Narasimhan (1932–2021), Indian mathematician
- Raghavan Narasimhan (1937–2015), Indian mathematician at the University of Chicago
- Rangaswamy Narasimhan (1926–2007), Indian computer scientist
- Vasant Narasimhan, CEO of Novartis

== See also ==
- Narasimha (disambiguation)
- Narasimham (disambiguation)
