= Narsinghgarh =

Narsinghgarh or Narsingarh may refer to several places in India:

== Madhya Pradesh ==
- Narsinghgarh State, a former princely state in British India 1681–1948
- Narsinghgarh, Madhya Pradesh, a town in Rajgarh district
  - Narsinghgarh (Vidhan Sabha constituency)
  - Narsinghgarh tehsil
  - Narsinghgarh Wildlife Sanctuary
- Narsinghgarh, Damoh, a town in Damoh district

== Tripura ==
- Narsingarh, Tripura, a town in West Tripura district
  - Narsinghgarh International Cricket Stadium

== See also ==
- Narasimha (disambiguation)
- Narsinghpur (disambiguation)
