= Narasimha Reddy =

Narasimha Reddy may refer to:

== People ==
- B. N. Reddy (1908–1977), an Indian filmmaker whose full name is Bommireddy Narasimha Reddy
- Kommidi Narasimha Reddy, also known as Bhudhan Reddy, an Indian politician
- L. Narasimha Reddy (born 1953), an Indian Judge
- Nayani Narasimha Reddy (1934–2020), an Indian politician
- Bhimreddy Narasimha Reddy, an Indian freedom fighter
- Uyyalawada Narasimha Reddy (1806–1847), an Indian freedom fighter

== Other ==
- Sye Raa Narasimha Reddy, a 2019 Indian film about Uyyalawada Narasimha Reddy

== See also ==
- Narasimha (disambiguation)
- Reddy (disambiguation)
