= Narasimharaju =

Narasimharaju or Narasimha Raju is the name of two Indian actors:

- Narasimharaju (Kannada actor) (1923–1979), Indian comedian
- Narasimharaju (Telugu actor) (born 1951)

== See also ==
- Narasimha (disambiguation)
- Raju (disambiguation)
- Narasimharaja, a locality in Mysore, Karnataka, India
- Narasimharajapura, a town in Karnataka, India
