= Raibania fort =

Ancient fort complex in Odisha, India

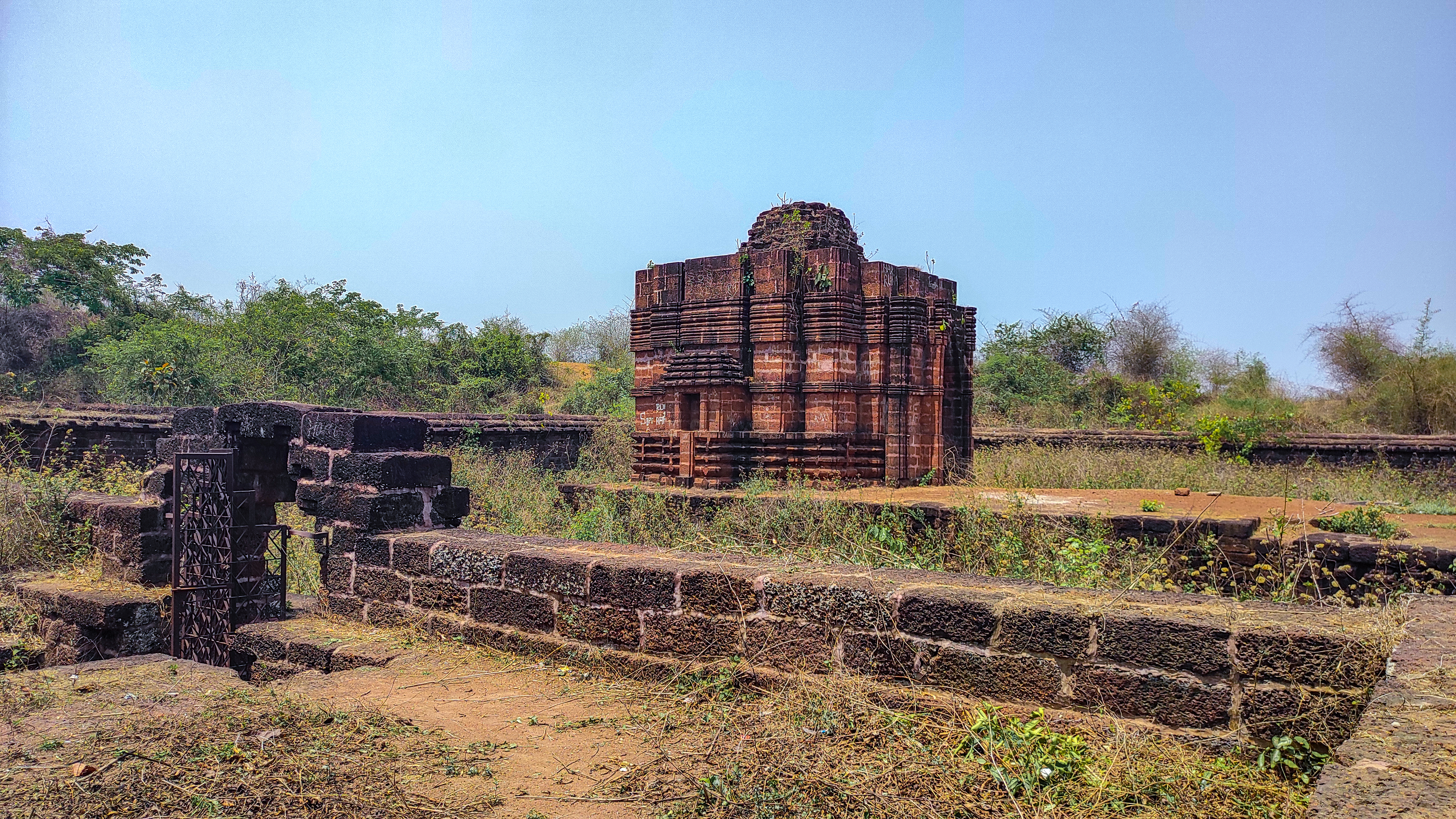
- Raibania fort
- Interactive map of Raibania fort
- Location: Raibania, Balasore, Odisha
- Coordinates: 21.9264°N 87.1867°E
- Designer: Narasingha Deva I
- Type: Fort
- Material: Red Redstone

Raibania fort is a group of ancient forts in Baleswar district, Odisha, India. This fort complex is considered as the biggest medieval fort of eastern India. It was built during the reign of Eastern Ganga ruler Narasingha Deva I. There are 161 fort goddesses which are as "Durga devata" or "Iṣṫa devata" and Daṣasharu which is an aniconic form of the goddess Jayachaṇḍi. Although three forts were recorded in the Ain-i-Akbari, four forts have been found here: two of the larger ones are closer to the village Raibania, and the other two are closer to the village Phulta (Phulahatta). According to The Balasore Gazetteer, the forts were devastated after the Kalapahada invaded Utkala. Post-invasion remnants of the forts except Raibania have been utilized for construction by the local Zamindars and villagers of the locality.

== Location ==
The Raibania fort complex is located in Laxmannath, 9 miles (14 km) from Jaleswar and 2 miles (3.2 km) from the river Subarnarekha.

- Hatigarh
- Chudamanipur
- Olmara
- Garhsahi
- Dolgram Fort:It is located at Nayagram Block under Jhargram district in West Bengal. Formally known as Deulgaon Fort in Kalinga History. It is famous for Pakshiraj statue, deul pukur, Dolmanch and ancient Jagannath Temple. Dolgram Pakshraj Fort was also a popular historical zone for playing the Pasha Game between Raja Narasingha Deb-iV (King Raibania fort ) and Raja Chandra Ketu (King of Chandrarekha-Dhumsai) on a very Big sized Royal Stone-stage at Dolgram Fort near Behrani Khal. A water emerged temple-pond(Raj-Deul) in middle of Padmapukur is a memorable significance of Maharaja Mukunda Deba at Royal Village Dolgram . Dolgram Balakesher High School is developed on Dolgram Pakshiraj Fort palace. A Pakhiraj (Winged horse-Pegasus )Statue situated near the cultural stage of School with a majestic tradition of culture and architectural innovation. Winged horse is a Rock art by an ancient King Maharaja Mukunda Deba. A Charak Festival was started from golden time of Dolgram which is very famous for Sharp weapon rule (Taloyar path) in every Chaitra month. Dol utsav also a famous festival of Dolgram region during dol purnima in every year on a stone made Dolmanch.A historical re-search organization named Dolgram Pakshiraj Trust(Nayagram) took initiative for Unhide the ancient history of Dolgram Pakshiraj Fort continuously.

== History ==
Narasingha Deva I, king of the Eastern Ganga dynasty of Utkala from 1238 to 1264, built the forts after conquering Humayun Khan to obstruct the entry of the Turks into Odisha.
