= Dharmapada (person) =

Person in Odia folklore

In Odia folklore, Dharmapada was the son of a great architect named Bishu Maharana, who completed the construction of the Sun Temple at Konark, Odisha on the eastern coastline of India, in a single night to save 1,200 craftsmen from execution from the then King Langula Narasingha Deva I. Legends say he sacrificed his own life by jumping into the ocean after carrying out the final step to complete the temple top to prevent the story from spreading. The Konark temple is still standing tall since 13th-century telling Bisu Maharana and his Son Dharmapada's stories.

== Legend ==
According to history, the king Langula Narasingha Deva I of the Eastern Ganga Dynasty decided to build a massive temple at Konark. The temple was to be in the shape of the Sun god, Surya riding in his chariot. 1,200 craftsmen were recruited to construct the temple, led by one named Bishu Maharana and the project was to take twelve years.

As the end of the twelve years approached, Dharmapada, the son of Bishu Maharana, now 12 years of age, went to visit his father. Upon arrival, he found his father distressed; the crown on the Sun temple's top had yet to be completed and the king had threatened to execute all 1,200 craftsmen if they did not finish it by morning. Although the task seemed impossible, Dharmapada decided to single-handedly complete it.

A debate then took place among the craftsmen. Fearing for their own lives if it became known that a child had completed the work instead of them, they demanded that Dharmapada be killed, a suggestion his father strenuously resisted. At last, to settle this debate, Dharmapada jumped from the crown he had completed, killing himself and ensuring the safety of the craftsmen.

== Historical relevance of the character ==
There are few references available to support the existence of such a person named Dharmapada. There is not much mention of this name in any of the ancient Odia texts. However, the legend of Dharmapada is widely popular across the state of Odisha. Extensive writing referring to the legend in the poem Dharmapada penned by Utkalamani Gopabandhu Das has probably given the character much-needed identity in modern Odia literature.

== Temple ==
The temple that Dharmapada is said to have completed still stands in Konark today, although in a somewhat dilapidated state. Constructed in the 13th century, it has been pillaged several times since then and has suffered severe damage. It is listed today as a World Heritage Site.

== Legend of Dharmapada: Historical Context and Literary Significance ==
The legend of Dharmapada, a young boy who is said to have sacrificed his life to protect the twelve hundred masons working on the Konark Sun Temple, has no known historical reference before the 19th century. This story was first popularized by Utkalamani Gopabandhu Das, who wrote about the boy’s sacrifice in his literary works. Specifically, the tale originates from the poem Dharmapadara Atmalipi (translated as The Autobiography of Dharmapada), found in Gopabandhu Das's book Bandira Atmakatha (translated as The Autobiography of a Prisoner). This book, composed during his imprisonment, is a blend of poetry and prose that reflects his deep philosophical thoughts, patriotism, and societal concerns.

Dharmapada Ra Atmalipi this story adds an emotional dimension to the temple's construction, there is no historical evidence to corroborate its authenticity. Many scholars view it as a later mythological addition, likely intended to emphasize devotion, sacrifice, and the immense craftsmanship associated with the temple’s construction rather than an actual historical event.

== See also ==
- Dhammapada
