= Narasingapuram, Papanasam taluk =

Narasingapuram
- village
- Country: India
- State: Tamil Nadu
- District: Thanjavur
- Taluk: Papanasam

Population (2001)
  - Total: 776

Languages
  - Official: Tamil
- Time zone: UTC+5:30 (IST)

Narasingapuram is a village in the Papanasam taluk of Thanjavur district, Tamil Nadu, India.

== Demographics ==
As per the 2001 census, Narasingapuram had a total population of 776 with 392 males and 384 females. The sex ratio was 980. The literacy rate was 67.28.
