= Narasingapuram, Ranipet district =

Narasingapuram
- Census Town
- Location in Tamil Nadu, India
- Coordinates: 12°58′20″N 79°17′44″E
- Country: India
- State: Tamil Nadu
- District: Ranipet

Population (2001)
  - Total: 10,555

Languages
  - Official: Tamil, Telugu
- Time zone: UTC+5:30 (IST)

Narasingapuram is a census town in Ranipet district in the Indian state of Tamil Nadu.

== Demographics ==
As of 2001 India census, Narasingapuram had a population of 10,555. Males constitute 50% of the population and females 50%. Narasingapuram has an average literacy rate of 76%, higher than the national average of 59.5%: male literacy is 82%, and female literacy is 71%. In Narasingapuram, 9% of the population is under 6 years of age.
