= Narasingapuram, Gummidipoondi =

Narasingapuram
- village
- Location in Tamil Nadu, India Narasingapuram (India)
- Coordinates: 13.45795268°N 80.12217522°E
- Country: India
- State: Tamil Nadu
- District: Tiruvallur
- Taluk: Gummidipoondi taluk
- Elevation: 16 m (52 ft)

Population (2011)
  - Total: 893
- Time zone: UTC+5:30 (IST)
- 2011 census code: 628564

Narasingapuram is a village in the Tiruvallur district of Tamil Nadu, India. It is located in the Gummidipoondi taluk. Elavur is the closest railway station.

== Demographics ==
According to the 2011 census of India, Narasingapuram has 264 households. The effective literacy rate (i.e. the literacy rate of population excluding children aged 6 and below) is 63.39%.

Demographics (2011 Census)
	Total	Male	Female
Population	893	439	454
Children aged below 6 years	109	52	57
Scheduled caste	258	127	131
Scheduled tribe	0	0	0
Literates	497	283	214
Workers (all)	389	253	136
Main workers (total)	371	241	130
Main workers: Cultivators	23	20	3
Main workers: Agricultural labourers	115	73	42
Main workers: Household industry workers	3	1	2
Main workers: Other	230	147	83
Marginal workers (total)	18	12	6
Marginal workers: Cultivators	1	1	0
Marginal workers: Agricultural labourers	5	2	3
Marginal workers: Household industry workers	0	0	0
Marginal workers: Others	12	9	3
Non-workers	504	186	318
