= Narsinghpur, Raebareli =

Narsinghpur
- Village
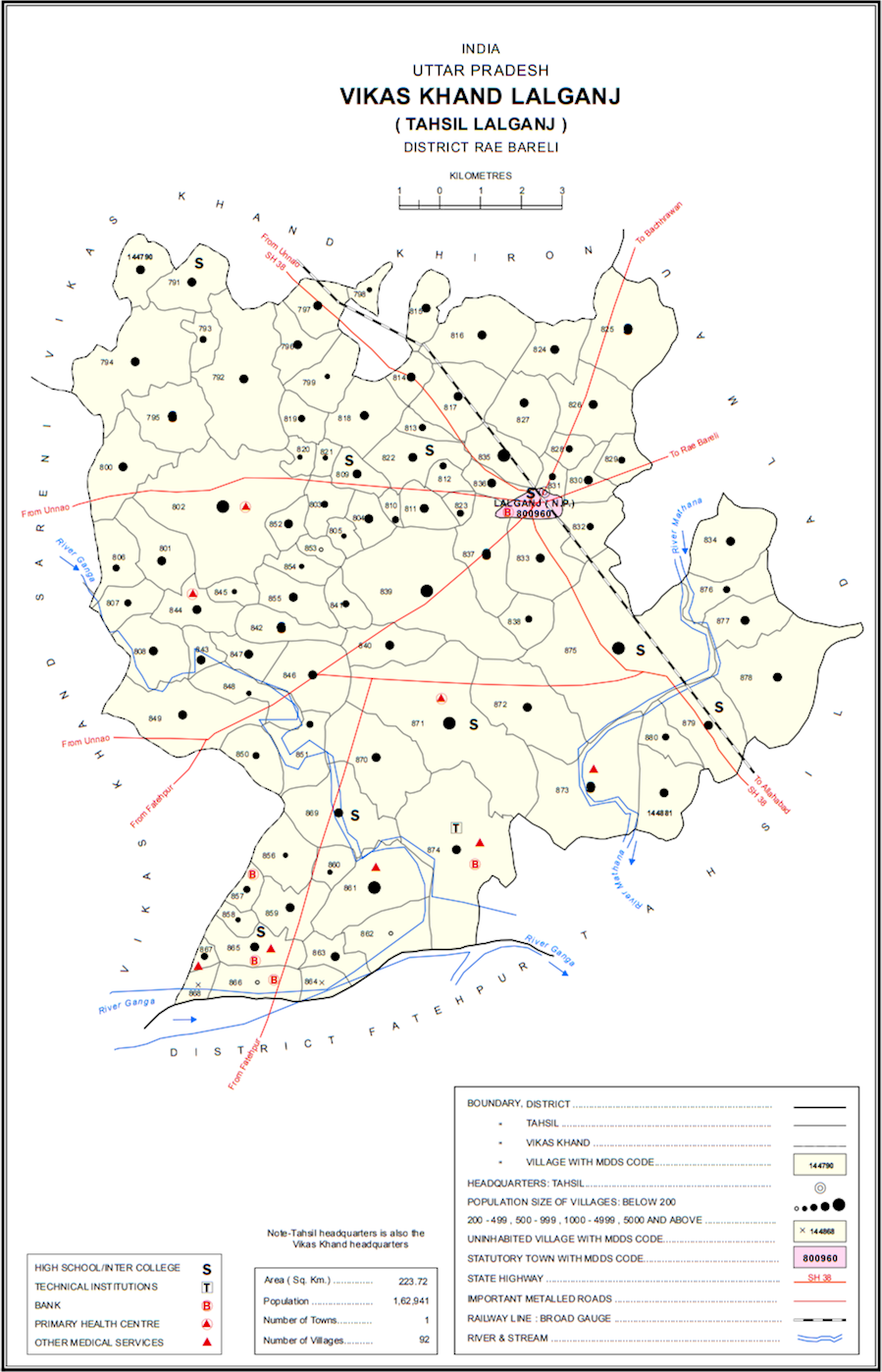
- Map showing Narsinghpur (#819) in Lalganj CD block

- Location in Uttar Pradesh, India
- Coordinates: 26.188174°N 80.918953°E
- Country: India
- State: Uttar Pradesh
- District: Raebareli

Area
  - Total: 0.936 km^{2} (0.361 sq mi)

Population (2011)
  - Total: 655
  - Density: 700/km^{2} (1,810/sq mi)

Languages
  - Official: Hindi
- Time zone: UTC+5:30 (IST)
- Vehicle registration: UP-35

Narsinghpur is a village in Lalganj block of Rae Bareli district, Uttar Pradesh, India. It is located 5 km from Lalganj, the block and tehsil headquarters. As of 2011, it has a population of 655 people, in 108 households. It has 1 primary school and no healthcare facilities, and it does not host a permanent market or a weekly haat. It belongs to the nyaya panchayat of Mubarakpur.

The 1951 census recorded Narsinghpur as comprising 1 hamlet, with a total population of 291 people (139 male and 152 female), in 49 households and 47 physical houses. The area of the village was given as 236 acres. 20 residents were literate, all male. The village was listed as belonging to the pargana of Khiron and the thana of Sareni.

The 1961 census recorded Narsinghpur as comprising 1 hamlet, with a total population of 316 people (143 male and 173 female), in 68 households and 55 physical houses. The area of the village was given as 236 acres.

The 1981 census recorded Narsinghpur as having a population of 484 people, in 78 households, and having an area of 95.51 hectares. The main staple foods were listed as wheat and rice.

The 1991 census recorded Narsinghpur as having a total population of 484 people (217 male and 267 female), in 83 households and 83 physical houses. The area of the village was listed as 94 hectares. Members of the 0-6 age group numbered 103, or 21% of the total; this group was 48% male (49) and 52% female (54). Members of scheduled castes made up 39% of the village's population, while no members of scheduled tribes were recorded. The literacy rate of the village was 31% (91 men and 59 women). 135 people were classified as main workers (106 men and 29 women), while 0 people were classified as marginal workers; the remaining 349 residents were non-workers. The breakdown of main workers by employment category was as follows: 59 cultivators (i.e. people who owned or leased their own land); 58 agricultural labourers (i.e. people who worked someone else's land in return for payment); 0 workers in livestock, forestry, fishing, hunting, plantations, orchards, etc.; 0 in mining and quarrying; 1 household industry worker; 7 workers employed in other manufacturing, processing, service, and repair roles; 1 construction worker; 1 employed in trade and commerce; 2 employed in transport, storage, and communications; and 6 in other services.
