= Narasimha Konda =

Human settlement in Andhra Pradesh, India

Narasimha Konda (Telugu: నరసింహకొండ) is a hill near the town of Jonnawada in Nellore district of Andhra Pradesh in India. It is a Hindu pilgrimage center and the site of an ancient temple dedicated to Narasimha, the man-lion avatar of the Hindu god Vishnu. There is a shrine for Adilakshmi Ammavaru.

== Geography ==
Narasimha Konda is a small hill place 15 km away from Nellore and 5 km away from Jonnawada near by Penna River. According to rock inscriptions at the site, the temple was built by the Pallava king Narasimhavarman I in the 9th Century. According to Hindu legend, the Pinakini River's banks were where the great king Kasyapa built this temple.

Standing upright as Lord Narasimha, this 350 feet high kshetra is beautiful and a holy place, and Sage Pungavu considered it as Tirdha Kshetra.

== Culture ==
It is a pilgrimage where Sri Lakshmi Narasimha Swamy temple is situated and where pilgrims visit the temple daily. The temple also holds celebrations for the holiday Krishna Janmashtami.

Bramhotsavams gets conducted at this temple very grandly in the month of May of every year.

A visit to the abode of Lord Narasimha is memorable with the ‘gali gopuram’ visible to visitors as one enters the verdant forests of Vedagiri.

Kshetra Mahatyam:

Kondi Kaasulu: A popular belief among people where in they offer money and coins in the Hundi to be protected from poisonous creatures such as snakes and scorpions. This Hundi is situated in the pradakshina path left to the Adilakshmi Ammavari Temple.

Santhana Vruksham: Situated to the right of Adilakshmi ammavari temple in the pradakshina path .Childless women pray to Adilakshmi ammavaru and tie a mudupu. Local lore states that by doing so women beget children.

One can view Dashavatara on the Ghat road of Narasimha Konda.

== See also ==
- Narasimha
