= Kovvali Lakshmi Narasimha Rao =

Indian writer

- Born: 1912; Tanuku, British India
- Died: 1975 (aged 62–63); Draksharama, Andhra Pradesh
- Occupation: Novelist
- Children: 2
- Writing career
- Pen name: Bhayankar
- Genre: Fiction

Kovvali was a popular novelist of Telugu language in the early 20th century. He is one of the most prolific writer of modern Telugu language. His full name is Kovvali Lakshmi Narasimha Rao (1912–1975), born in Tanuku. According to some sources, Kovvali has written over 1000 Novels, which is a record not surpassed by any Telugu writer till now. These novels were extremely popular with the public and known as "Railway Literature".

The period from 1935 to 1975, when Romantic movement was fading, the Progressive movement was on the rise. Women were slowly gathering up the guts to read something new about the love, sexuality and freedom. His novels had the distinction of being banned from "respectable" households, because they gave "ugly and unhealthy ideas" to the women. He wrote them with short intervals, about one novel a week; some in just two days. Book vendors would get into trains with bundles of magazines and short novels. These novels, a quarter-size of foolscap paper, were sold thick and fast as Kovvali novels had a big clientele.

His work addressed a number of social issues, particularly those affecting women. He advocated women's education and addressed subjects such as unhappy marriages, child marriage and marriage by choice. His female characters were frequently portryaed as challenging social and familial constraints. His work also addressed themes including hypocrisy, adherence to tradition, greed and corruption.

Some of his novels were adapted for movies in Telugu cinema. D.L. Narayana's production Sipayi Kooturu in 1959,' was the screen version of a Kovvali novel.

Recently, 18 of his novels are published as compilation in 2009 as "Kovvali Navalalu Konni" by Acharya Kottapalli Veerabhadra Rao.

He died in 1975 in Draksharama. He has two sons named Nageswara Rao and Lakshmi Narayana.
