= Anangabhima Deva III =

Eastern Ganga emperor from 1211 to 1238

Anangabhima Deva III ଅନଙ୍ଗଭିମ ଦେବ ତୃତୀୟ
- Rauta; Durgaputra; Rudraputra; Purushottama; Purushottamaputra; Maharajadhiraha
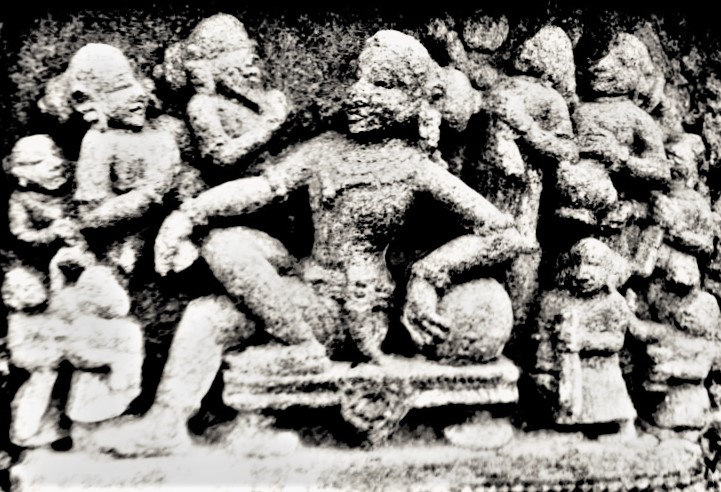
- A depiction of Rauta Anangabhima Deva III from thirteenth century Jagannath temple in Jajpur district.

Eastern Ganga Emperor
- Reign: 1211–1238
- Predecessor: Rajraja Deva III
- Successor: Narasingha Deva I
- Spouse: Somala Devi; Kastura Devi
- Issue: Narasingha Deva I; Chandrika
- House: Eastern Ganga dynasty
- Father: Rajraja Deva III
- Mother: Malhanadevi (Eastern Chalukya princess)
- Religion: Hinduism

Anangabhima Deva III (Odia: ଅନଙ୍ଗଭିମ ଦେବ ତୃତୀୟ; r. 1211–1238) was the Eastern Ganga emperor from 1211 to 1238. He maintained a large territory that stretched from the river Ganga in the north to Godavari in the south. He had defeated the Kalachuris on the western frontiers of the empire and established a matrimonial alliance with them. His brother or brother-in-law, Rajaraja II, became the ruler of the dynasty in 1198. When Anangabhima III came into power in 1211, he expelled the Muslims of Bengal from his kingdom. He had a son, Narasingha Deva I, who invaded Bengal in 1244 and captured the capital city, Gauda. He was a reformist in the social and spiritual structure of the Odia society as he declared Lord Jagannath as the supreme ruler of his empire and himself a servant (Rauta) under him. The Madala Panji chronicles depict him dedicating everything to lord Jagannath. He built the famous Pradaskhina mandapa of Srikurmam temple.

== Foundation of Bidanasi Katak or Cuttack City ==
Ananga Bhima Deva III became the ruler of the ancient land of Kalinga in the year 1211. At the time of his coronation, his kingdom faced repeated attacks from the Muslim forces of Ghiyasuddin Iwaj Shah, the ruler of Bengal. The Kalachuri kings had been struggling to take over the territory of Odisha from the times of the Somavanshi rulers and the western frontier of Anangabhima's kingdom was repeatedly violated by them. Anangabhima chose the strategic location on the bifurcation of rivers Mahanadi and Kathajodi for the site of his new capital and moved his capital to Bidanasi Katak. In 1230 A.D he moved his headquarters to the new capital. Katak literally means a fortification. The city was named as Bidanasi Katak (new Varanasi fort) and a new fort complex called Barabati was constructed to build up his military force under the guidance of his able Brahman minister and military adviser named as Vishnu.

== Military career and achievements ==
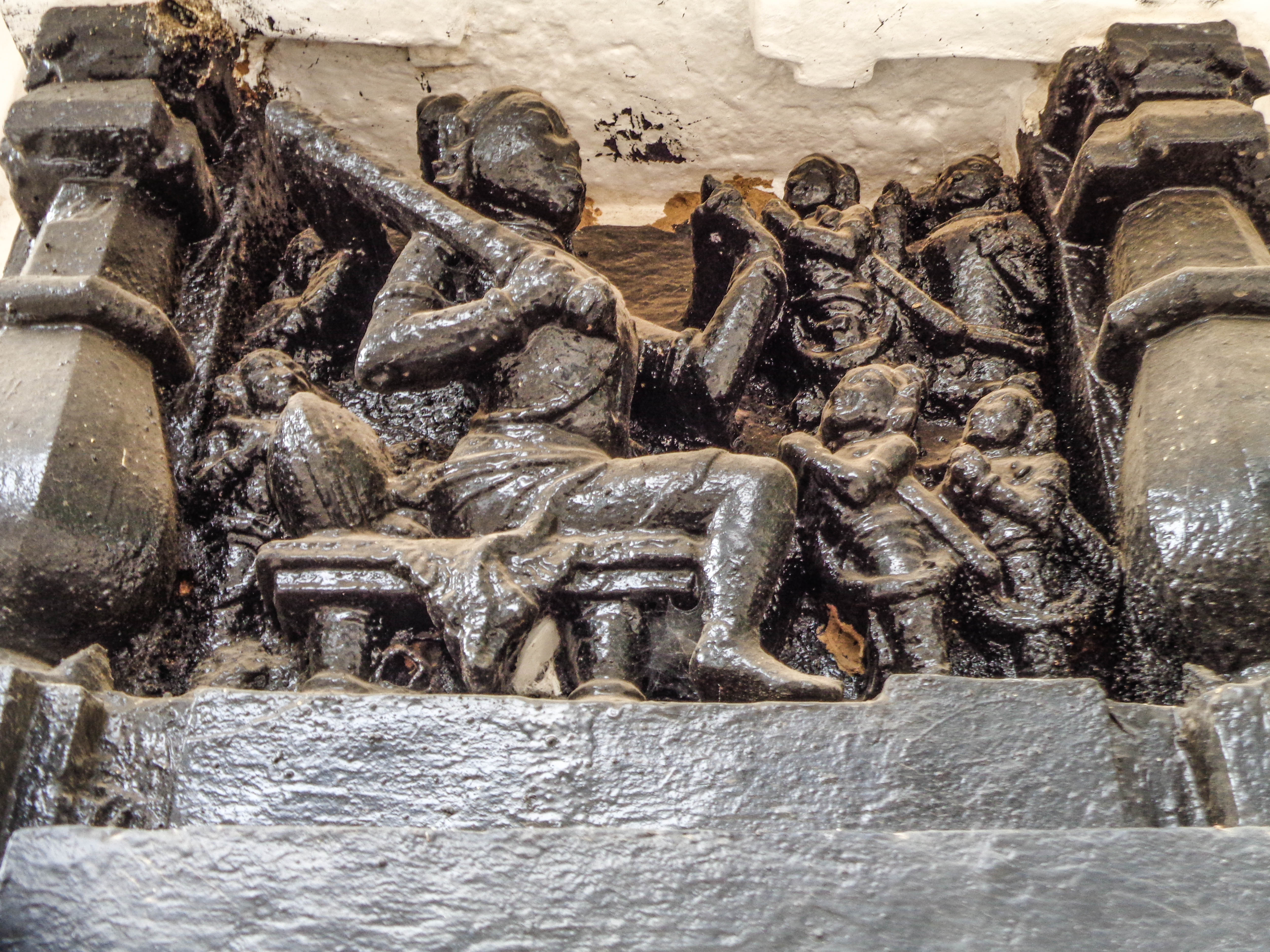
Depiction of Anangabhima Deva III at Naganath Temple, Nagena, Dhenkanal

Anangabhima Deva III was the most successful achiever of military objectives after a long line of limited rulers in the region. While regaining lost territories, he also managed to defend his kingdom from greater threats of the Bengal Muslim rulers by crossing over into their territory and also expanded his empire in southern India till Srirangam that is situated in the heart land of today's Tamil Nadu state.

=== Victory Over the Kalachuris at Seori Narayana ===
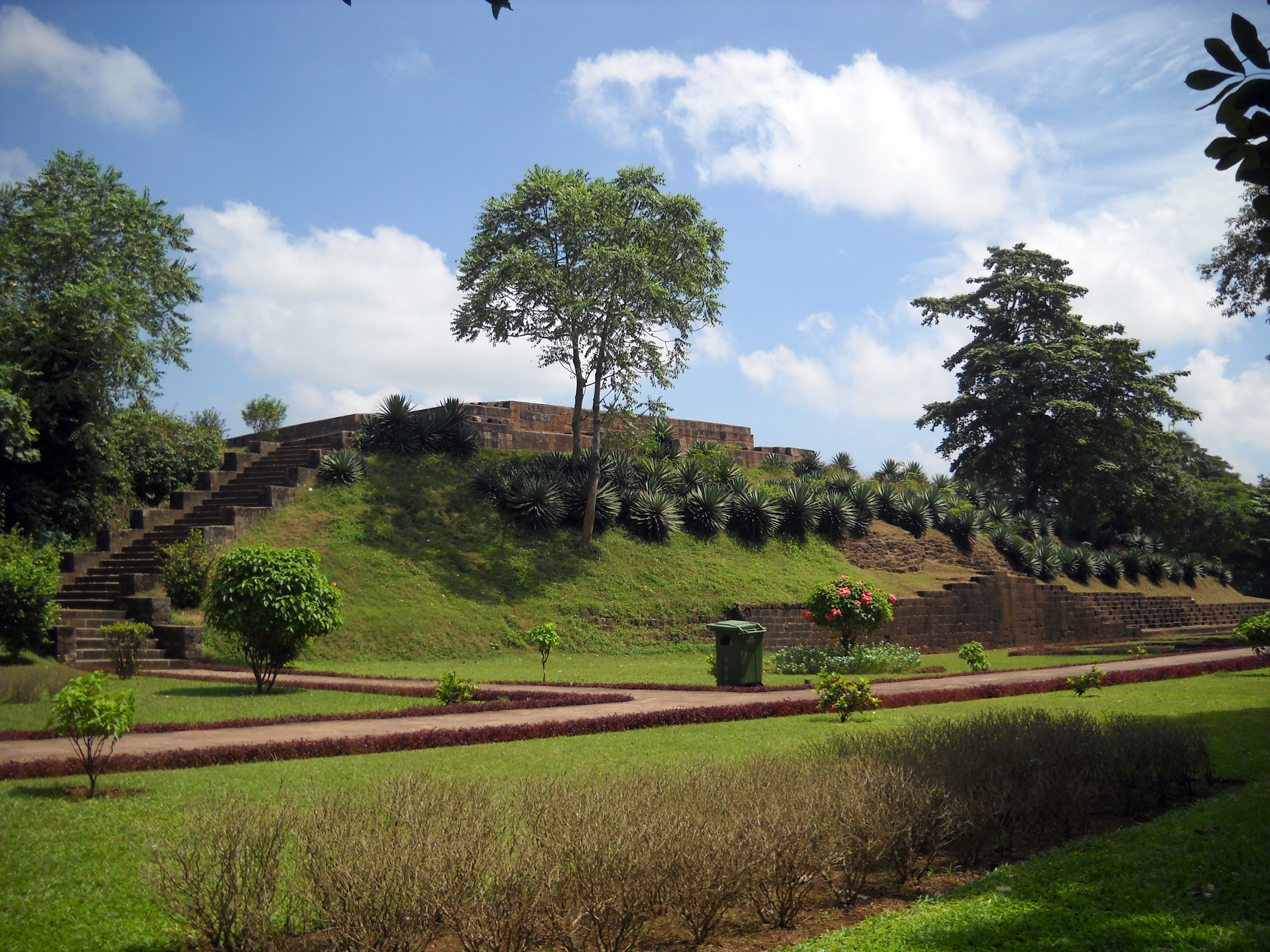
Ruins of Barabati Fort in Cuttack, the construction of which started during the rule of Anangabhima Deva III

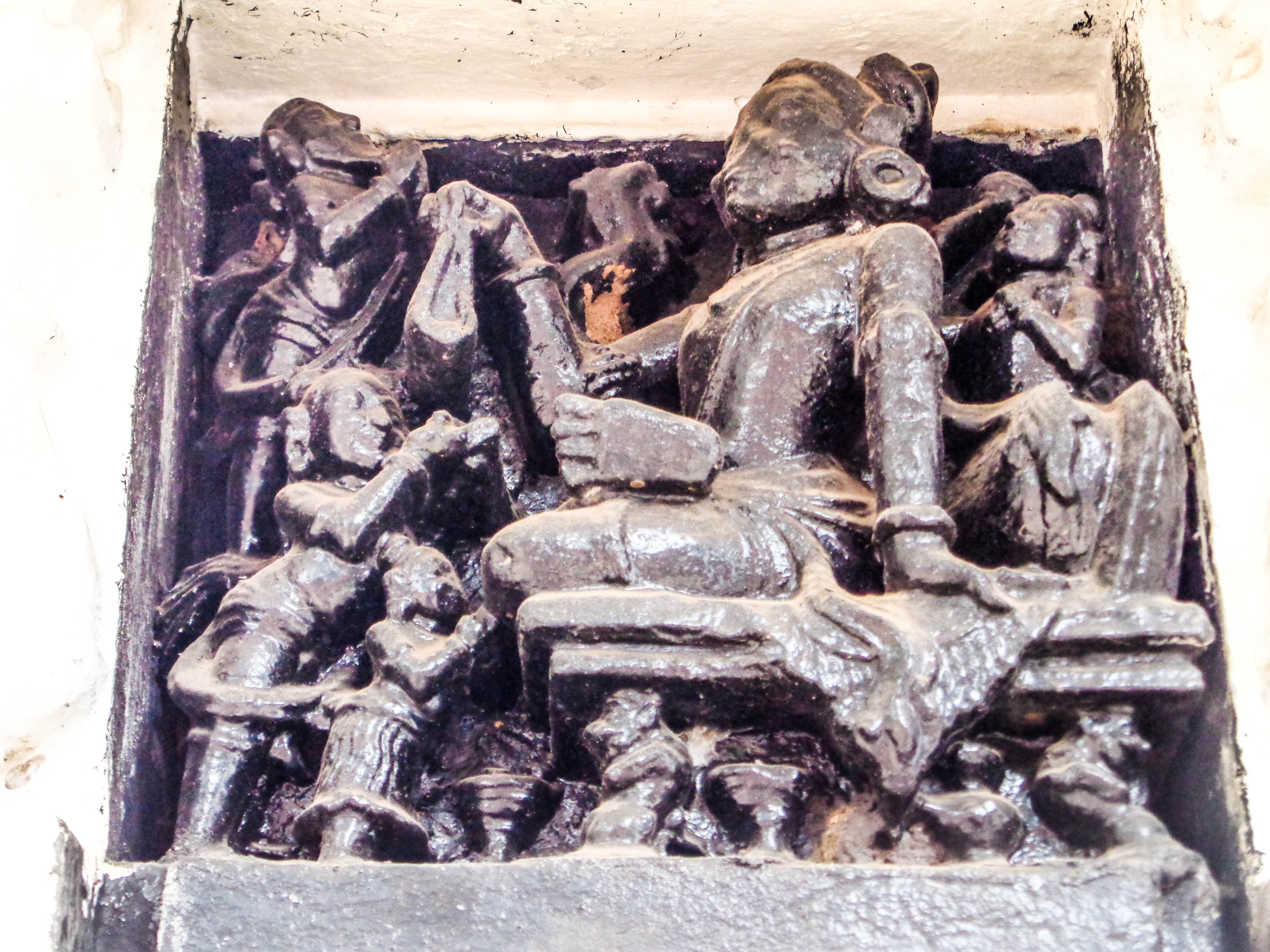
King Anangabhima Deva III depicted at Naganath Temple, Nagena, Dhenkanal

Anangabhima Deva III was at the threshold of the continuous conflict with the eventually depleting Ratnapura Kalachuri dynasty which had defeated the Somavamshis and occupied the western tracts of ancient Kalinga kingdom at its height in the past or the complete Tri Kalinga region. The southern Haihaya kings of Tumana in modern Bilaspur district were also to a certain extent fighting against the Ganga forces. Anantavarman Chodaganga Deva, the ancestor of Anangabhimadeva III was unsuccessful in reclaiming these lost territories despite his numerous military achievements. The Kalachuri king, Pratapmalla continued his attempts to invade the frontiers of the Ganga territory along with his son Paramardi Dev. Anangabhima send a large force under the command of his able Brahman commander, Vishnu. The two forces met face to face at the Seori Narayana village in undivided Sambalpur district on the banks of the river called Bhima near the Vindhya hills and the Kalchuris were defeated for the first time in a major way by the Gangas.

According to the Chateswara Temple Inscription of Anangabhima mentions that Vishnu terrorized the Kalachuri king to an extent when he lost his psychological balance.

Vindhyadreradhisima-Bhimatatini-kunje....Vishnu-Vishnu-.

Rasavasaviti-Bhayadvai-Tandisah-Pasyatah....Visvam-

Visnumayam Yatha Parinatam Tummana Prithivipateh

Which means: Vishnu, the Brahamin minister and general of Anangabhima Deva III frightened the king of Tummana on the bank of the Bhima river near Vindhyas so much so that the latter perceived Vishnu everywhere throughout his kingdom.

Pratapmalla was taken prisoner and forced to cede the Sambalpur-Sonepur-Bolangir tracts along with parts of what is now Chhattishgarh state to the Ganga kingdom. Later with the advice of his minister Vishnu, Anangabhima established a diplomatic and matrimonial alliance with the Kalachuris by offering the hand of his daughter Chandrika in marriage to the Kalachuri prince, Parmardi Dev. Once the alliance was secured, the Ganga forces multiplied in strength. This diplomatic decision was made keeping in eye the long term prospects of a major threat from the Muslim rulers of Bengal.

==== Chandrika, the Ganga Princess ====
Chandrika, the daughter of Anangabhima III was an expert in music and dance. She was a devout Vaishnavite and later built the Ananta Vasudeva temple at Bhubaneswar with the permission of his brother Narasingha Deva I after he inherited the throne. She was married to the Haihaya prince Parmardi Deva by the wishes of her father for the foundation of a military alliance through a marital relation between the Eastern Gangas and the Kalachuri-Haihaya princedoms of Tumana. She lost her gallant Haihaya husband in the final recorded battle of Narasingha Deva I's invasion of Bengal at Umurdan (Amarda in Mayurbhanj district). Paramardi Deva had led the Eastern Ganga forces with possibly the other conscript soldiers from the independent and Semi independent Hindu kingdoms in Eastern India against the Muslim rulers of Bengal under the command of his Eastern Ganga brother in law.

=== War with the Invading Khilji Malik of Bengal (1223–1225 A.D.) ===
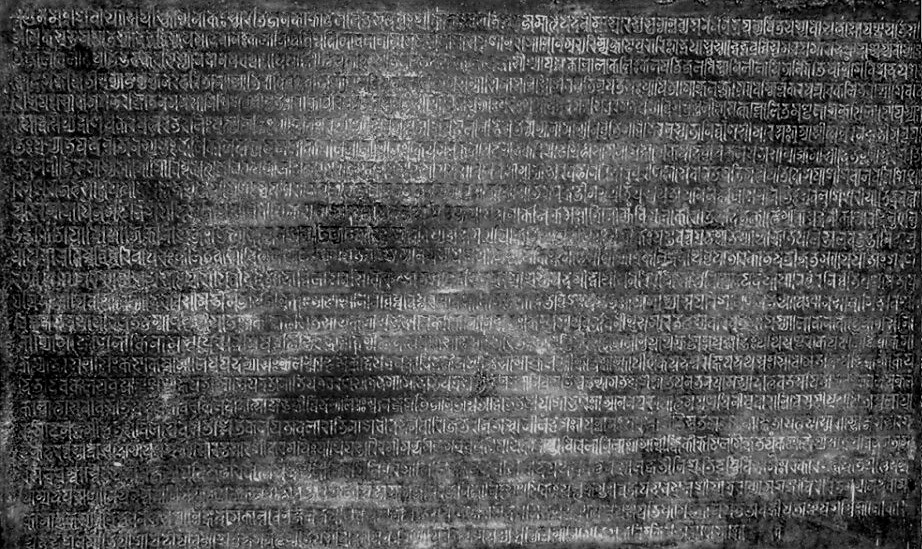
Sanskrit Inscription of Anangabhima Deva III at Chateswara Temple built during his rule

After defeating the Kalchuris, Anangabhima faced a major threat from the invading Muslim forces of Khilji Maliks from Bengal. His prime enemy Ghiyasuddin Iwaj Shah, the ruler of Bengal was a successor of Muhammad bin Bakhtiyar Khilji who was a successful military general of Qutb Ud Din Aibak. Ghiyassuddin had built a powerful navy and set out for conquest of neighboring kingdoms like Kamarupa and Odisha. He invaded the northern territories and also sent naval armadas over the river Mahanadi to capture his newly founded capital, destabilize his military strength and occupy lands. During the series of these events the newly built Barabati Fort was successfully used to repulse the enemy attacks from the river. His able minister and military adviser, Vishnu commanded a force that chased the invading Muslims on the land out of northern Odisha. The inscriptions of Chateswar temple (Salepur in Cuttack district) and Ananta Vasudeva temple confirm that the Muslim forces of Bengal were defeated by the able commander Vishnu who was able to pull his bow string until his ears and shot arrows killing many enemy soldiers.

Odia forces are noted to have crossed over into Bengal, giving chase to the fleeing Yavanas during the conflict as mentioned in the inscriptions.

Chateswara Temple Inscription Statements Indicating the Role of Vishnu in the Battle Against the Yavanas (Muslims):

Karnottam- Sita-Savakasya-Subhata-Nekakina Nighnatah

Kimbruna-Yavanavanindra-Samare Tattasaya-Varabratam

Anantavasudeva Temple Inscription Statements:

Yadvamse-Vaijayanti-Patamiva-Subhato-Anangabhimah Pravavah

-Pradhvastaratiraja Vraja -Yuvati-Yanodgita Gambhirasarah

Asidasivisire-Radhikataratarasta Drugarvorugarobah-Svante

Svantapasarpata Yavamapi Yavanam Sangare Sanjahara.

Which Means: In Chodaganga Deva's lineage was like a flag the heroic Anangabhima, whose profound strength was celebrated by the damsels of a multitude of hostile kings destroyed by his power, and who was exceedingly proud of his swift horses, the speed of which surpassed that of snakes' foes Garuda. He made an end of the war by defeating the Yavanas with impetuosity after entering into their territory beyond the frontier.

=== Conflicts in Southern India and Conquests till Kanchi and Srirangam (1230 A.D.) ===
In the first stage of this campaign on his southern rival Ganapatideva, Anangabhima advanced until the Krishna river and camped there. The territories were included in the Odisha in the year 1230 A.D. However, in the second stage the Kakatiya king by the name Narasimha II defeated his forces and the territories until East Godavari were lost to the Kakatiyas. Taking advantage of the Kakatiya king Ganapati Deva's invasion on the Chola territory and according to Allalanatha temple inscription, Anangabhima III overran the Kanchipuram and Srirangam towns in south India. His queen Somaladevi Mahadevi is recorded to have made a valuable gift to the temple of Allalanatha. Anangabima became the first Eastern Ganga ruler to place his inscription in the Simhanchalam temple.

Historian T.V. Mahalingam states that Anangabhima Deva III took the advantage of political situation in the Chola kingdom during the rule of Rajaraja III and occupied Kanchipuram. Anangabhimadeva might have been invited by the rebellious vassal of the Chola ruler Kopperunjinga who had imprisoned Rajaraja III at Sandamangalam in the south Arcot district. Vira Narasimha II of the Hoysala dynasty who reinstated Rajaraja III back on the throne has also inscribed that he uprooted a contingent of Kalingan forces from the city of Kanchipuram. This eventful conflicts in the southern regions let the Odishan forces extend their hegemony till the Krishna river in the south.

== Personality, Constructive Activities and Cultural Contribution ==
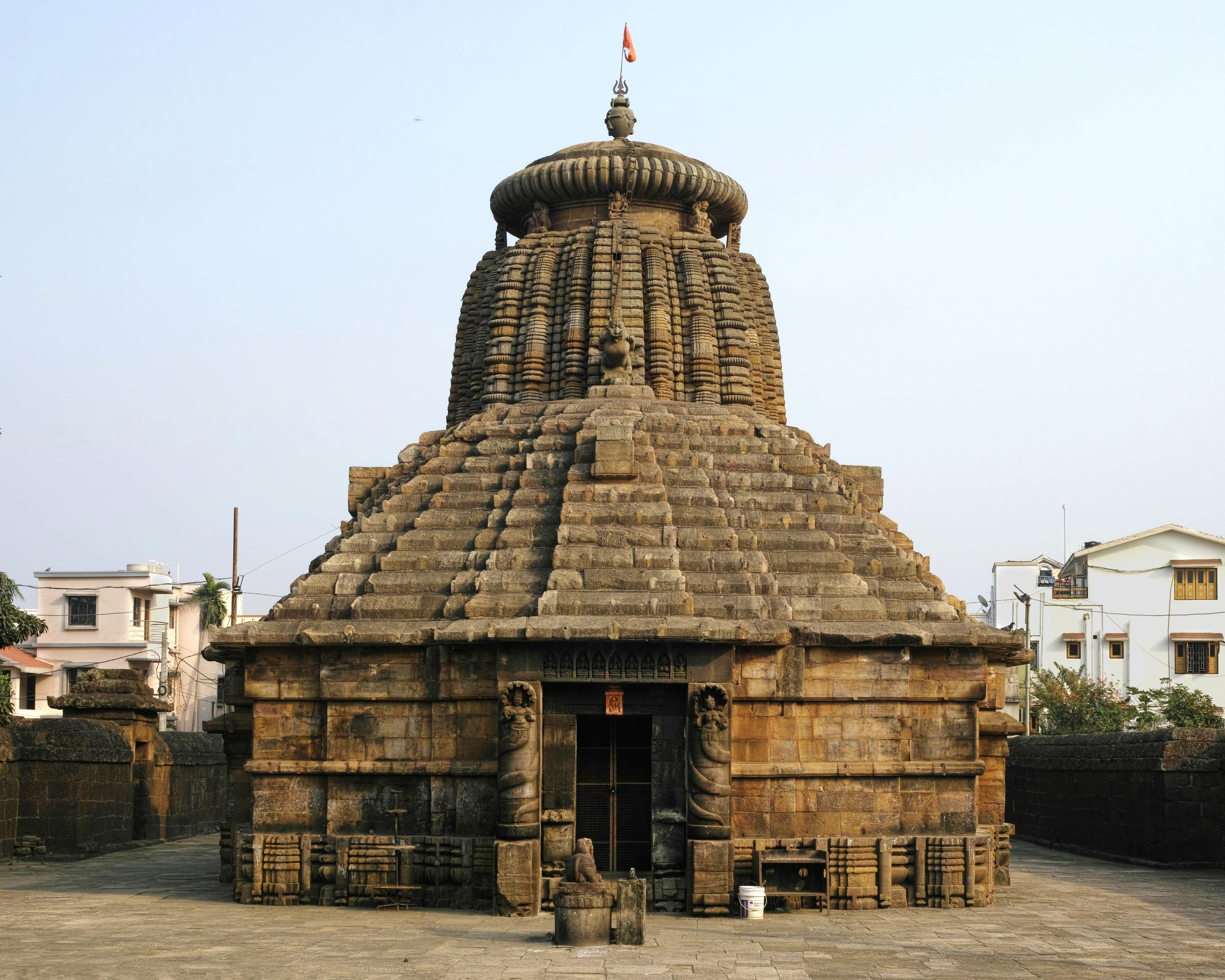
Megheswara temple in Bhubaneswar built during the rule of Anangabhima Deva III

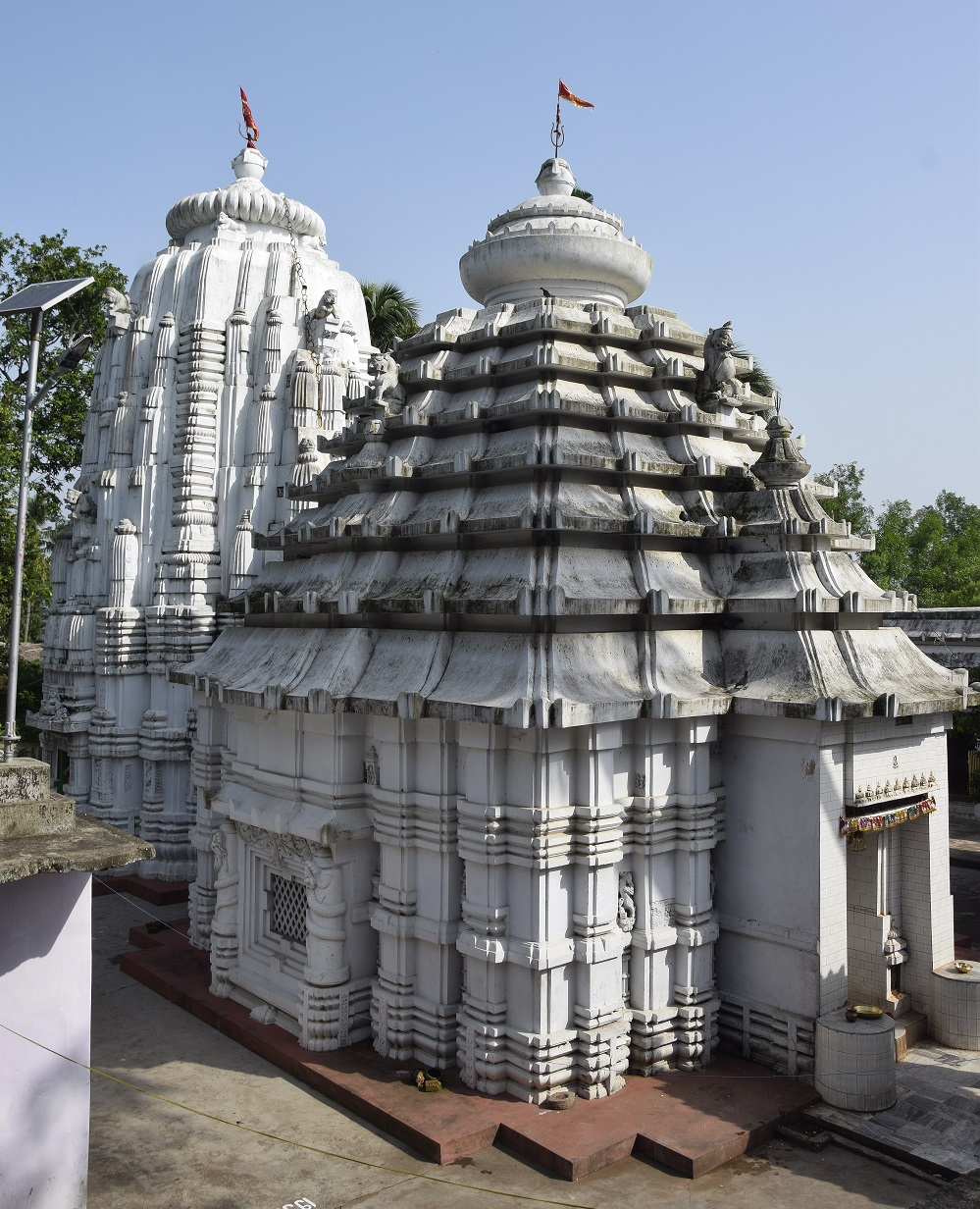
Chateswara Temple built during the rule of Anangabhima Deva III

Srikumam and Draksarama inscriptions mention that Anangabhima was a devout Vaishnavite and extremely spiritual person. The Allalnath Perumal inscription at Kanchipuram of his wife Somaladevi says he used to follow the fasting ritual of Ekadasibrata of Vaishnavism and was the son of Purrushottama (a name of Vishnu). He assumed the title of Anangabhima-Rauta-Deva (Rauta meaning deputy) and declared himself as the sole deputy of Lord Purushottama or Lord Jagannath. He also assumed the titles of Parama Vaishnava and Parama Mahesvara to legalize his higher spiritual position in the state. It was during his rule that Lord Jagannath of Puri was officially accepted as the national deity. In the year 1238 A.D. he declared his regnal year or Anka as the regnal year of Lord Purushottama.

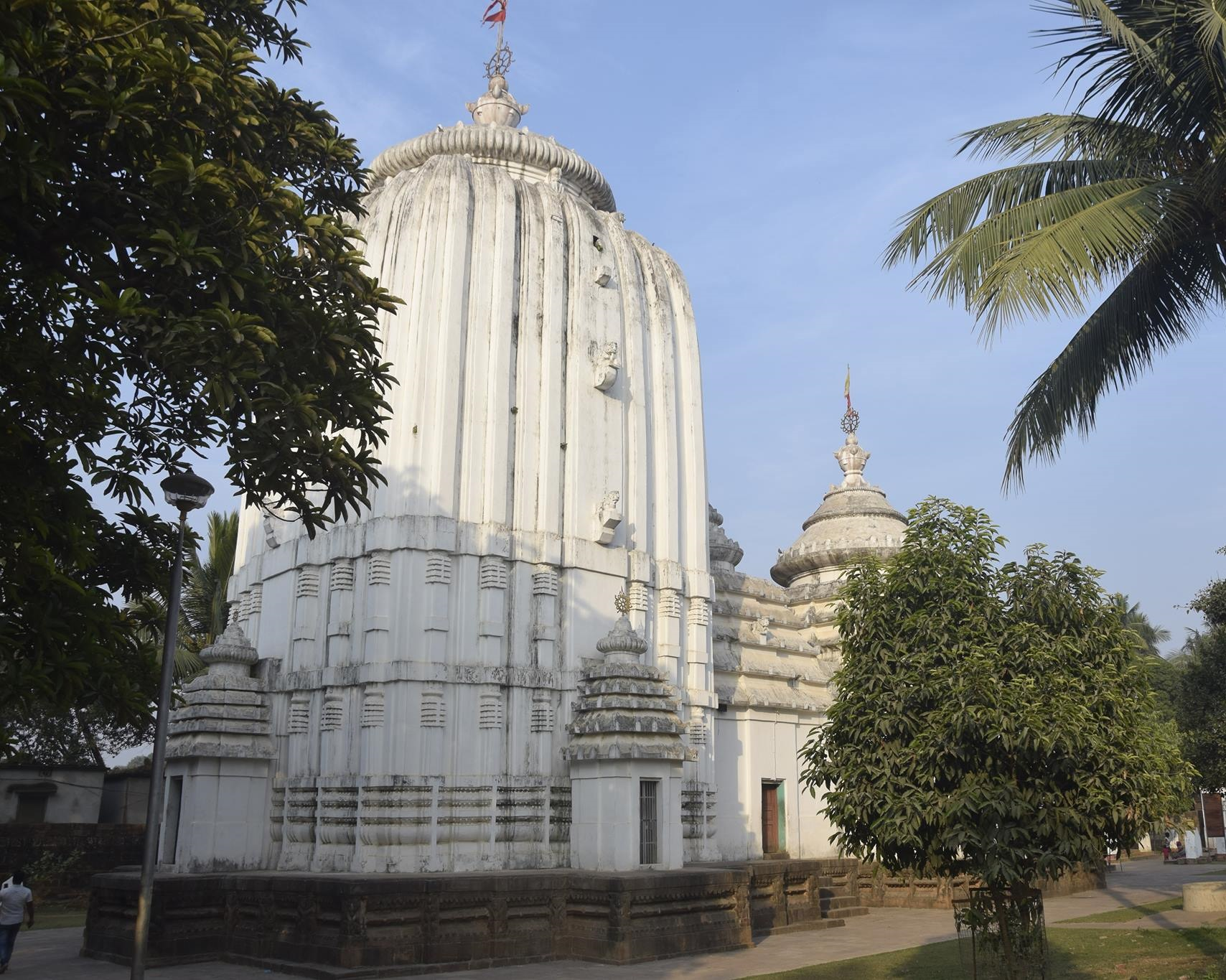
Anangabhima Deva III's Jagannath Temple at Jajpur that was rebuilt in 18th Century by the Maratha Hindu ruler Raghuji Bhonsle I and after it was attacked by Bengal Nawab Suleiman Karani in the year 1568.

He is speculated to have build a new Jagannath temple at Cuttack, his newly founded capital city along with two Shiva temples like Meghesvara at Bhubaneswar. Anangbhima Deva III is also credited for the construction of the Chateswara Shiva temple situated near Salepur in Cuttack district along with the Jagannath temple at Jajpur town that was destroyed by the invading forces of Suleiman Karani in the sixteenth century and was later rebuild by Maratha ruler Raghuji Bhonsle I of Nagpur in the eighteenth century. He had also erected the original Baladevjew temple at Tulasi Khetra in Kendrapada and it was later demolished by the Mughal subedar of Aurangzeb named as Khan-I- Dwina in 1663 to erect a Mosque. The original deities were taken into hiding by the priests and later restored to a new location and in a new temple erected after a century by local Zamindars and rulers with the permission of the Maratha ruler Janoji. The later temple is still existing while the Mosque stands on the original site. During his rule the leaning temple of Huma at Sambalpur was also built which was later renovated or reconstructed by Chauhan kings in seventeenth century. Anangabhima Deva financed and monitored constructions along with serious maintenance activities of the old structures within the Jagannath temple complex at Puri. Some four inscriptions recording details about daily food offerings and land donations to lord Jagannath has been found in the entrance walls of Pataleswara temple inside the complex.

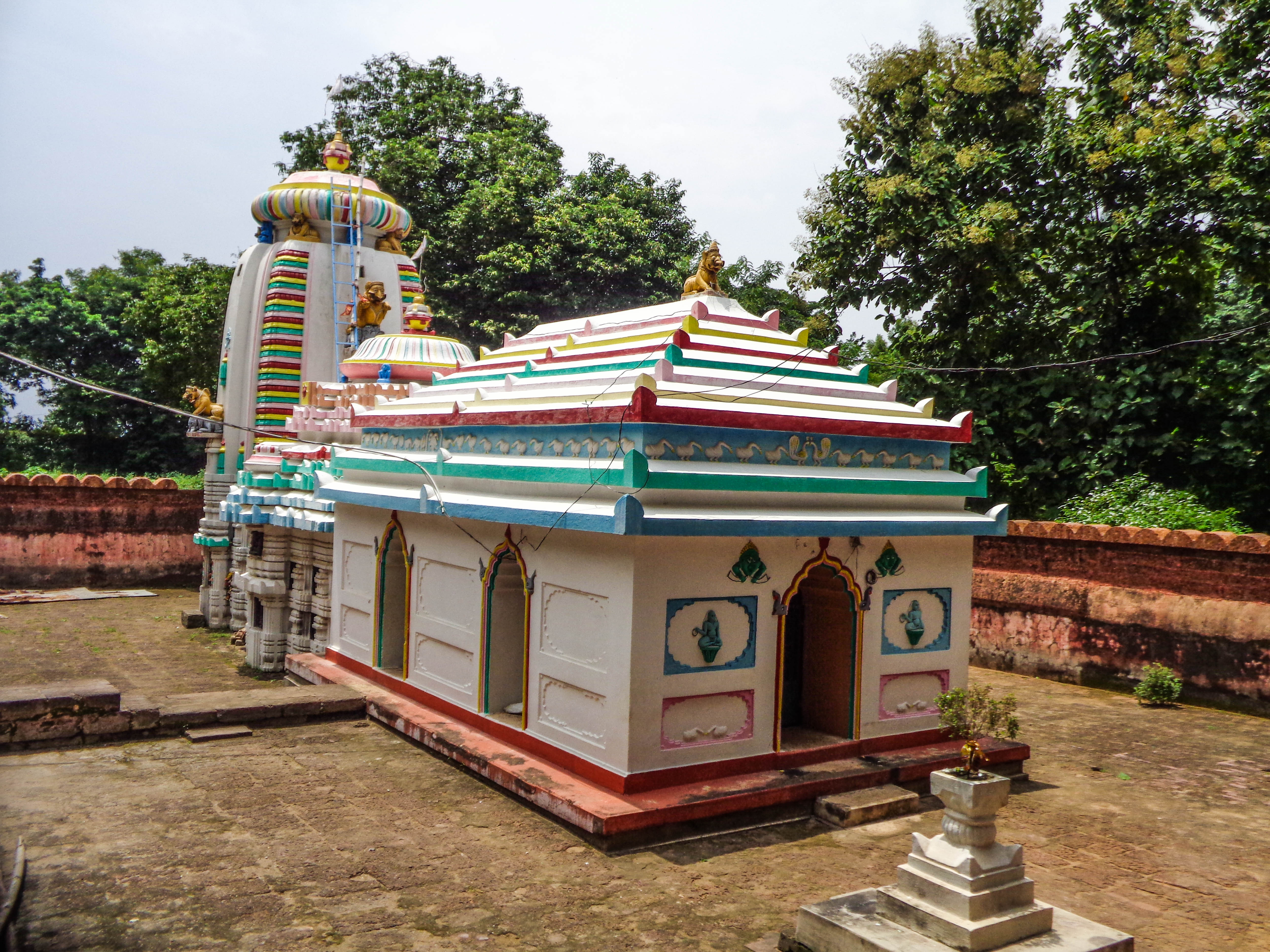
Naganath Temple, Nagena, Dhenkanal constructed by Anangabhima Deva III

Anangabhima Deva declared himself as Purushottamaputra, Rudraputra and Durgaputra in his Draksarama inscription. This indicates the state policy of all the three Hindu denominations came together under a harmonious unified spiritual structure during his rule. He donated to multiple Shaiva shrines across his empire. He completed the construction of Puri Jagannath temple. He introduced the Chattishaniyoga or 36 types of services to the lord Jagannath. Some four recorded inscriptions of the Ganga king has been found inside the Jagannath temple of Puri and in which mentions about huge land grants to the temple and lord Jagannath. He had also introduced the ‘Panda’ or priest care system at the Puri shrine. The Draksarama Nagari plate inscription also credits him for making many land grants to the Brahmins. His Chatesvara temple inscription states that he undertook numerous public welfare projects for construction of roads, tanks, houses and temples for the people. As per the Madalapanji temple records of Puri Jagannath, the king undertook a land settlement by the assistance of his two revenue ministers Damodar Badapanda and Isana Pattanayak. The total revenue collected during his rule was four crores and forty-three lakhs of tankas. He also ordered repairing of old temples and places of historical significance.

== Temples built ==
- Chateshwar Temple
- Original Baladevjew Temple in Kendrapara (Demolished by Mughals in 1663 and a mosque erected on its foundation)
- Original Jagannath Temple in Jajpur Town (Damaged by invading Muslim army of Suleiman Karani from Bengal 1568–1569)
- Original Shaivite temple at Huma in Sambalpur (It was rebuilt from its ruins by Chauhan king Baliar Singh who ruled from 1660 to 1690 A.D.)
- Meghesvara Temple
- Naganath Temple, Nagena, Dhenkanal
- Jagannath Temple at Cuttack (No more existing)
- Renovations or construction of additional structures at Puri Jagannath temple. Completion of the sanctum happened during this time.

== See also ==
- Eastern Ganga Dynasty
- Narasimha Deva I
