= Anand =

Anand may refer to:

== People ==
- Anand (name), a surname and given name (including a list of people with the name)
- Anand (clan), a clan of an Indian caste
- Anand (actor), Indian actor
- Anand (Maoist), Indian communist
- Anand (writer) (born 1936), Indian Malayalam writer

== Places ==
- Anand, Gujarat, India, a city
- Anand railway station
- Anand district, Gujarat, India
- Anand (Lok Sabha constituency), Gujarat, India
- Anand (Vidhan Sabha constituency), Gujarat, India
- Anand, Iran, a village

== Outer space ==
- 23323 Anand, a main belt asteroid
- 9 Andromedae, variable star designation AN And

== Films ==
- Anand (1971 film), a Hindi-language film starring Rajesh Khanna and Amitabh Bachchan
- Anand (1986 film), a Kannada-language film starring Shiva Rajkumar
- Anand (1987 film), a Tamil-language film starring Prabhu Ganeshan
- Anand (2004 film), a Telugu-language film starring Raja and Kamalinee Mukherjee
- Anand Ingalagi, character in the Indian film series KGF

== Other uses ==
- Anand Agricultural University, Gujarat, India
- Anand Vihar Terminal railway station, in Anand Vihar, Delhi, India

== See also ==
- Ananda (disambiguation)
- Anandhi (disambiguation)
- Ananta (disambiguation)
- Annand, Scottish surname
