= Ananta =

Anant, Ananta or Anantha may refer to:

== Hinduism ==
- Ananta (infinite) (Devanagari: अनन्त), an epithet of Vishnu, with meanings in other Indic religions
- Ananta Shesha, the serpent that circles the world

== Places ==
- Ananta (Arequipa), a mountain in the Arequipa Region, Peru
- Ananta (Cusco), a mountain in the Cusco Region, Peru
- Ananta (Puno), a mountain in the Puno Region, Peru
- Anantapur, Andhra Pradesh, a district of Andhra Pradesh, India
- Ananta Vasudeva Temple (thirteenth century) at Bhubaneswar, in Orissa state of India
- Thiruvananthapuram (holy city of Anantha), capital city of Kerala

== People ==
=== People in government ===
- Ananta (king) (died 1068 AD), a king of the Lohara dynasty of Kashmir
- Ananta Narcina Naik, Indian politician
- Ananta Nayak (born 1969), Indian politician
- Ananta Prasad Paudel (born 1962), Nepalese politician
- Ananta Singh (1903–1979), Indian revolutionary
- Anantha Venkatarami Reddy (born 1956), Indian politician

=== People in film ===
- Anant Balani (1962–2003), Bollywood film director and screenwriter
- Ananta Jalil (born 1978), Bangladeshi film actor and producer
- Ananth Babu, Indian Telugu film actor
- Anantha Sriram (born 1984), Indian lyricist working primarily in Telugu film

=== People in literature ===
- Ananta Charan Sukla (1942–2020), Indian philosopher and writer
- Ananta Kandali (1540–1580), Brahmin poet

=== Other people ===
- Ananta Charan Sai Babu (1915–1989), Indian dancer
- Ananta Kumar Ghosh (born 1954), Indian football coach
- Fahd Ananta (born 1988), Bangladeshi entrepreneur
- Ananth Dodabalapur, Indian-American engineer
- Anant Kumar Agarwal, American electrical engineer
- Ananta Saha, (born 1996) Indian cricketer

== Other uses ==
- Ananta Bhalobasha, a 1999 Bangladeshi film featuring Shakib Khan
- Ananta (video game), an upcoming 2027 video game developed by Naked Rain and NetEase Montreal and published by NetEase
- Ananta (film), a 2018 Indonesian film series
- Anantha Rathriya, 1996 Sri Lankan drama film

== See also ==
- Ananda (disambiguation)
- Anand (disambiguation)
- Anta (disambiguation)
