= Madhabananda Temple =

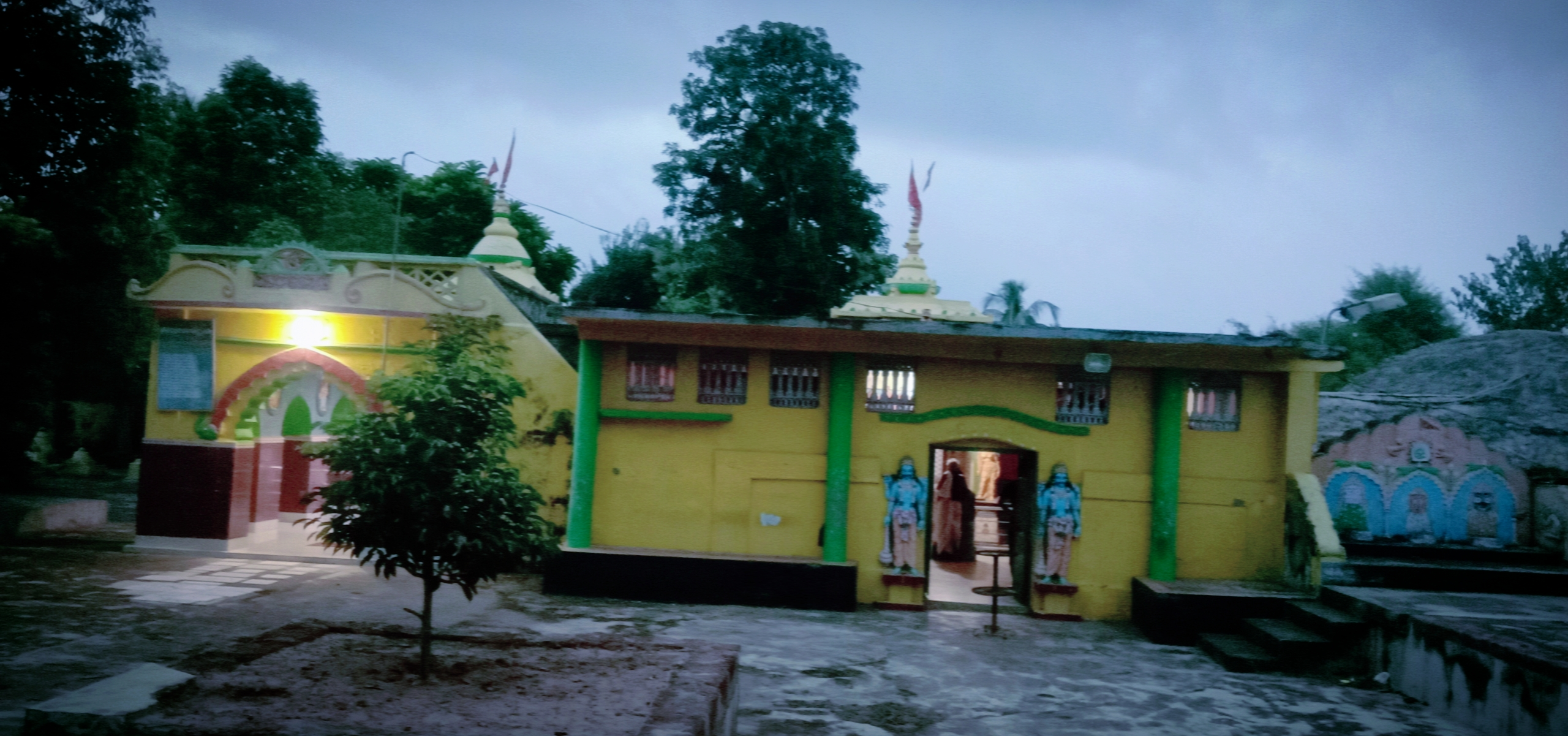
- Madhabananda Temple at Paga-Gopinathpur village

- Location in Odisha

Religion
- Affiliation: Hinduism
- District: Cuttack
- Deity: Lord Jagannath, Goswami Madhabananda
- Festivals: Dola Jatra, Dadhi Khela Jatra, Rama Navami, Janmashtami

Location
- Location: Gopinathpur village, Salipur
- State: Odisha
- Country: India
- Interactive map of Madhabananda Temple
- Coordinates: 20°30′47″N 86°02′16″E

Architecture
- Type: Kalinga Architecture

Madhabananda Temple or Madhabananda Math is a temple in Cuttack district of Odisha. This temple is famous for specially curing of cow's, dedicated to Mahapurush Madhabananda and located at Paga-Gopinathpur village (near Bahugram) of Salipur area in Cuttack district.

== Location ==
It is located from 20 kilometres (12 mi) east of Cuttack city and 4.5 km (2.8 mi) from S.H-9A (Jagatpur-Salipur-Pattamundai-Chandabali road) via Paga Chhak. It is nearest 1.8 km (1.1 mi) from Chateshwar Temple. The nearest railway station is Kapilas Road Junction railway station (7 km (4.3 mi) away), Jagatpur Railway station (16 km (9.9 mi) away) and Cuttack Junction railway station (21 km (13 mi) away) and the nearest Airport is Biju Patnaik Airport, Bhubaneswar (48 km (30 mi) away).
