= Satsvarupa das =

It may refer to:

- First part of the name of Satsvarupa dasa Goswami
- Sat-svarupa as part of the Satcitananda elements of sat, cit and ananda and dasa refers to servant or slave of God.
