= Anantavarman =

Anantavarman may refer to:

- Anantavarman (Vasishtha dynasty), 5th century Indian king
- Anantavarman Chodaganga, 12th century Indian king from the Eastern Ganga dynasty

== See also ==
- Ananta (disambiguation)
- Varman (disambiguation)
