= Chateshwar Temple =

Chateswar Temple
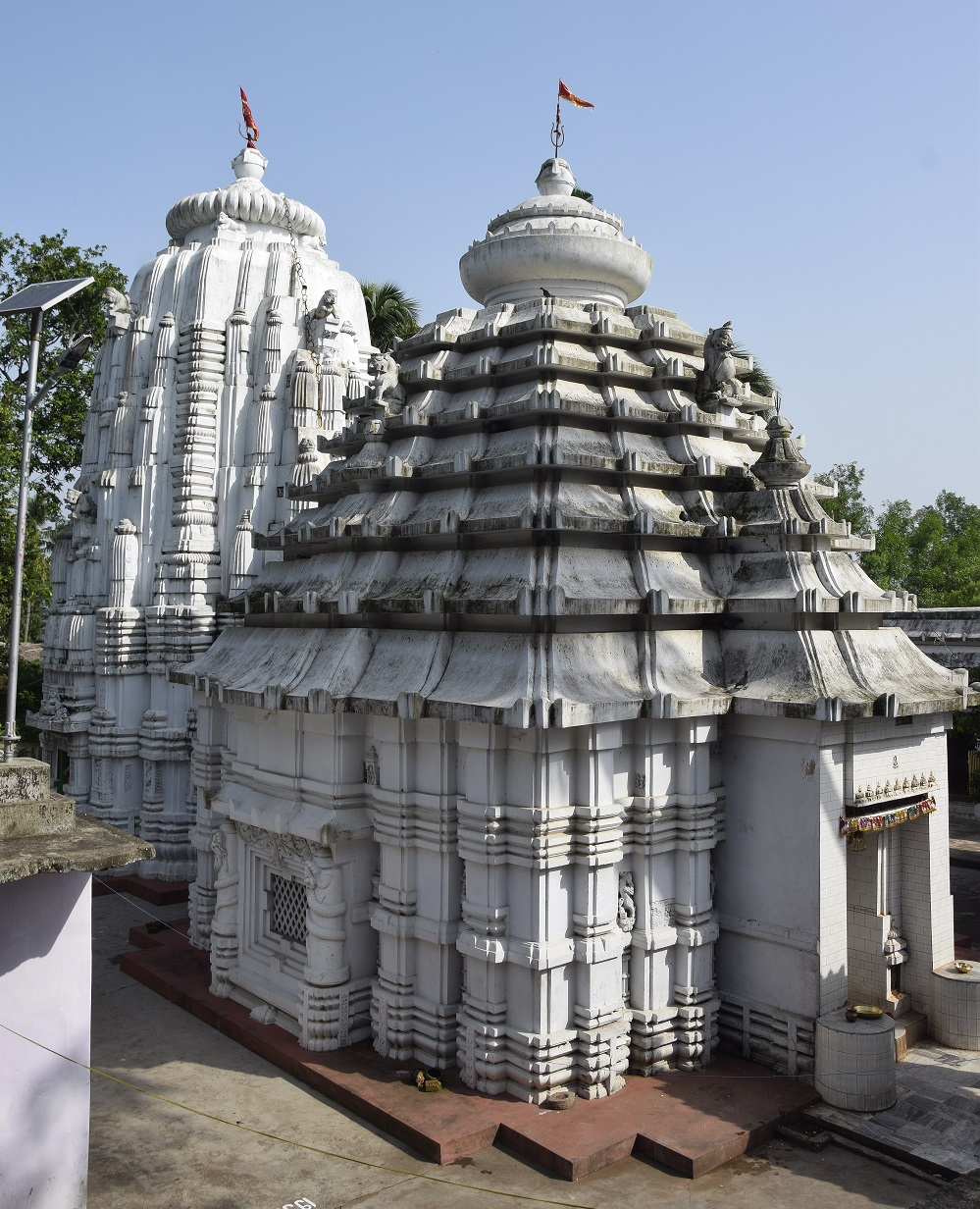
- Chateswar Mahadev Temple at Kishinapur village

- Location in Odisha

Religion
- Affiliation: Hinduism
- District: Cuttack
- Deity: Lord Shiva
- Festivals: Mahashivratri, Dola Purnima, Kartik Purnima

Location
- Location: Kishinapur village, Salipur
- State: Odisha
- Country: India
- Interactive map of Chateswar Temple
- Coordinates: 20°30′12″N 86°02′55″E

Architecture
- Type: Kalinga Architecture
- Creator: Anangabhima Deva III

The Chateswar Temple is a Hindu temple of Odisha, India, which is dedicated to Lord Mahadev.It is one of a patalaphuta Shivalinga Temple and it is located at the Kishinapur village (Near Paga-Gopinathpur) of Salipur in Cuttack district.

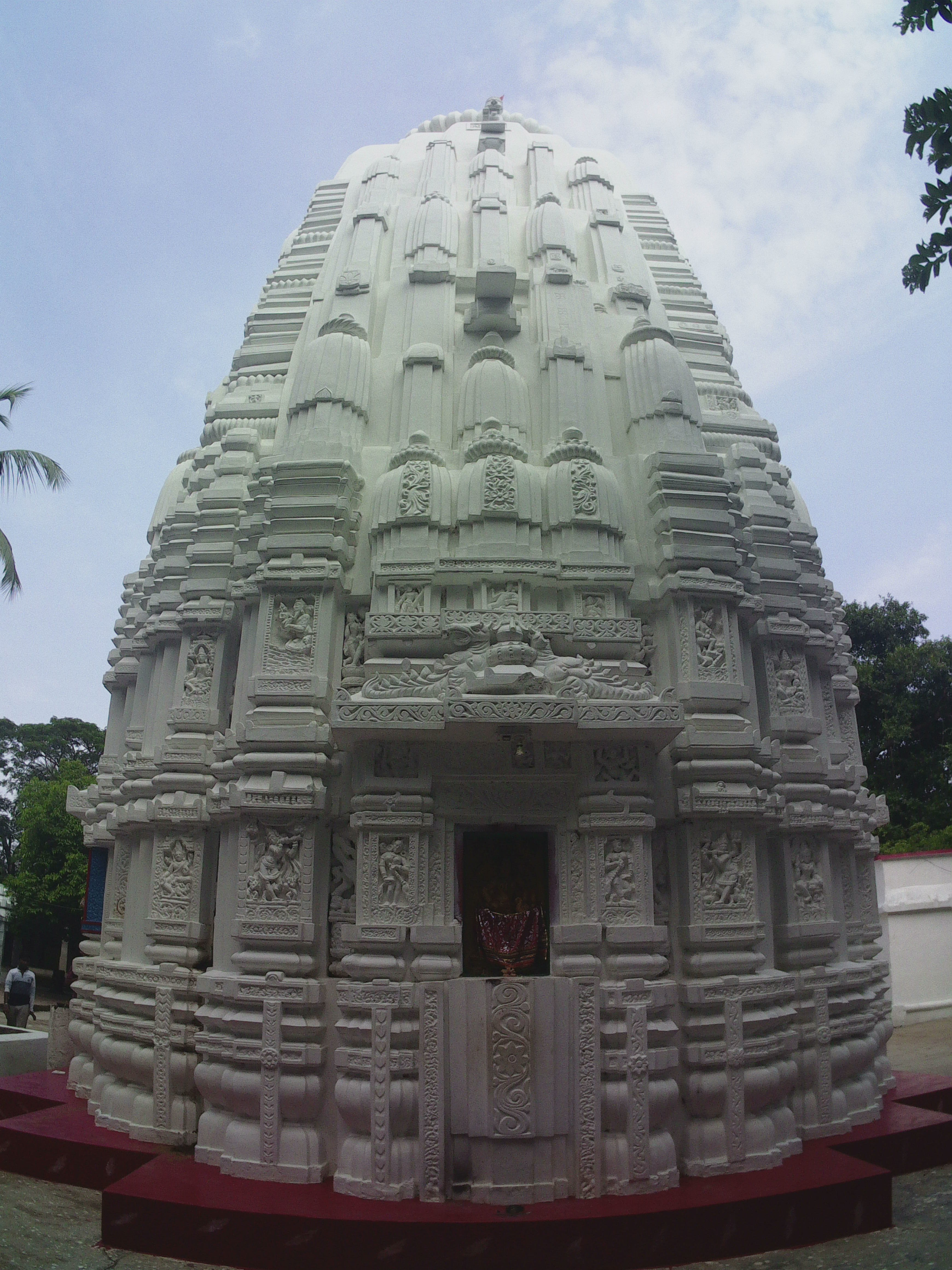
Chateswar Temple at Kisinapur Cuttack

== Architecture ==
On the basis of a number of detached sculptures of different faiths like Saivite and Sakta, the original temple can be assigned to the Eastern Ganga dynasty rule during 12th Century AD. A miniature four- armed Vishnu, broken images of Chamunda, Surya and Buddha, Udyotasimha, Nandi, miniature temple and other architectural members. The temple is pancharatha on plan and the bada has multi-segmented horizontal mouldings in elevation. The temple was built by 'Vishnu' a minister under Ganga monarch Ananga Bhima Deva III whose inscription is also found in the temple.

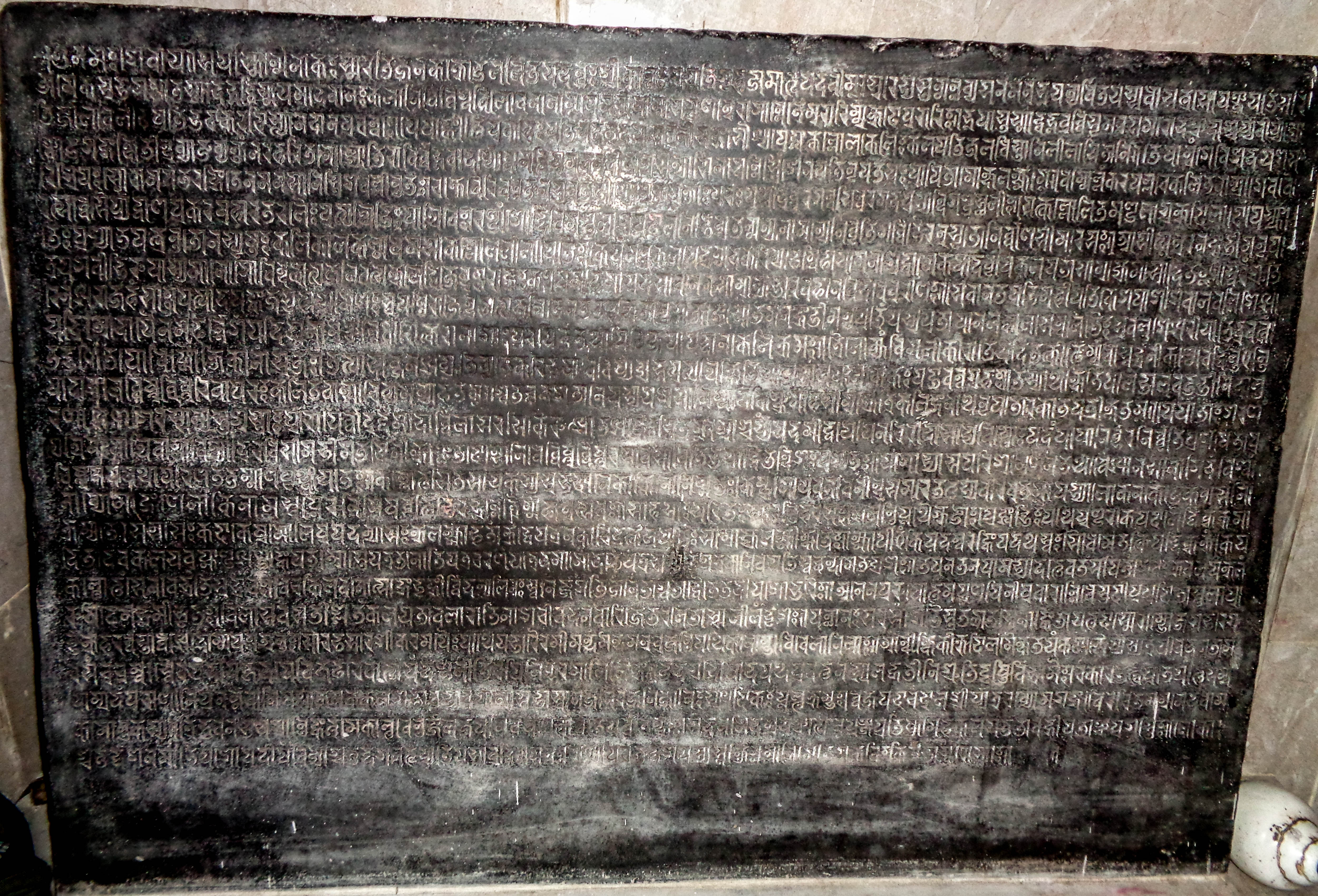
Chateswar Temple inscription of Anangabhima Deva III

== Festivals ==
Major ones are Dola Purnima, Shivaratri, Kartik Purnima ,Nabaratra Puja and Margashirsha Purnima. During Mondays and Sankranti days, one can see a large crowd. It is easily accessed by road from Cuttack via Jagatpur,
