= Anandhi =

Anandhi or Anandi is an Indian feminine given name. It may refer to:

- Anandhi (film), a 1965 Indian Tamil-language film released
- Anandi Gopal, a 2019 Indian Marathi-language film about Anandi Gopal Joshi
- Anandi Art Creations, an Indian film production company
- Chhoti Anandi, an Indian animated TV series

== People with the given name ==
- Anandhi (actress) (born 9 December), an Indian actress
- Anandhi Ajay, an Indian actress
- Ananthi Sasitharan (born 1971), a Sri Lankan politician
- Anandi Gopal Joshi (1865-1887), an Indian female doctor
- Anandibai, a Peshwa queen
- Anandiben Patel (born 1941), an Indian governor

== See also ==
- Ananda (disambiguation)
- Anand (disambiguation)
