= Ananda Rao =

Ananda Rao or Anandarao is an Indian name and may refer to:

- Ananda Rao Samuel (1928–1999), bishop of Krishna Godavari of the Church of South India
- B. Radhabai Ananda Rao (born 1930), member of Indian Parliament
- T. Ananda Rao (1852–1919), Indian administrator and Diwan of Mysore

== See also ==
- Ananda (disambiguation)
- Rao (disambiguation)
