= Sananda =

Sananda may refer to:

- Sananda (magazine), an Indian women's magazine
- Sananda (New Age), a name used by some New Age groups for the resurrected Master Jesus
- Sananda Fru (born 2003), a German basketballer
- Sananda samadhi, the third of four samadhis described in the Yoga Sutra 1:17 by Patanjali
- Sananda TV, an Indian entertainment channel broadcasting in Bengali, owned by the ABP Group

== See also ==
- Ananda (disambiguation)
- Sananda Maitreya (born 1962), an American singer–songwriter, formerly known as Terence Trent D'Arby
- Sananda Maitreya (New Age)
- Sanandaj, city in Iran
