= Anant Kumar Agarwal =

Engineer

Anant Kumar Agarwal from the Cree Inc., Chapel Hill, NC was named Fellow of the Institute of Electrical and Electronics Engineers (IEEE) in 2012 for contributions to silicon carbide power device technology.
