= 9 Andromedae =

Star in the constellation Andromeda

- Location of 9 Andromedae (circled)

Observation data Epoch J2000 Equinox ICRS
- Constellation: Andromeda
- Right ascension: 23^{h} 18^{m} 23.32223^{s}
- Declination: +41° 46′ 25.2043″
- Apparent magnitude (V): 5.98

Characteristics
- Evolutionary stage: Main sequence
- Spectral type: A7 V or A7m
- B−V color index: 0.215±0.002
- Variable type: β Lyr

Astrometry
Radial velocity (R_{v})	−3.8±2.9 km/s
Proper motion (μ)	RA: −10.430±0.018 mas/yr Dec.: −9.873±0.023 mas/yr
Parallax (π)	7.1328±0.0286 mas
Distance	457 ± 2 ly (140.2 ± 0.6 pc)
Absolute magnitude (M_{V})	0.43

Orbit
Period (P)	3.2196 d
Eccentricity (e)	0.03
Inclination (i)	60.2°
Periastron epoch (T)	2,436,094.876 JD
Semi-amplitude (K_{1}) (primary)	71.6 km/s

Details

9 And A
Mass	2.48 M_{☉}
Radius	3.51 R_{☉}
Luminosity	49.2 L_{☉}
Temperature	8,200 K
Rotational velocity (v sin i)	81 km/s

9 And B
Mass	1.32 M_{☉}
Luminosity	17.5 L_{☉}
Temperature	6,330 K

Other designations
- 9 And, AN And, BD+40°5043, HD 219815, HIP 115065, HR 8864, SAO 52881, PPM 64041

Database references
SIMBAD	data

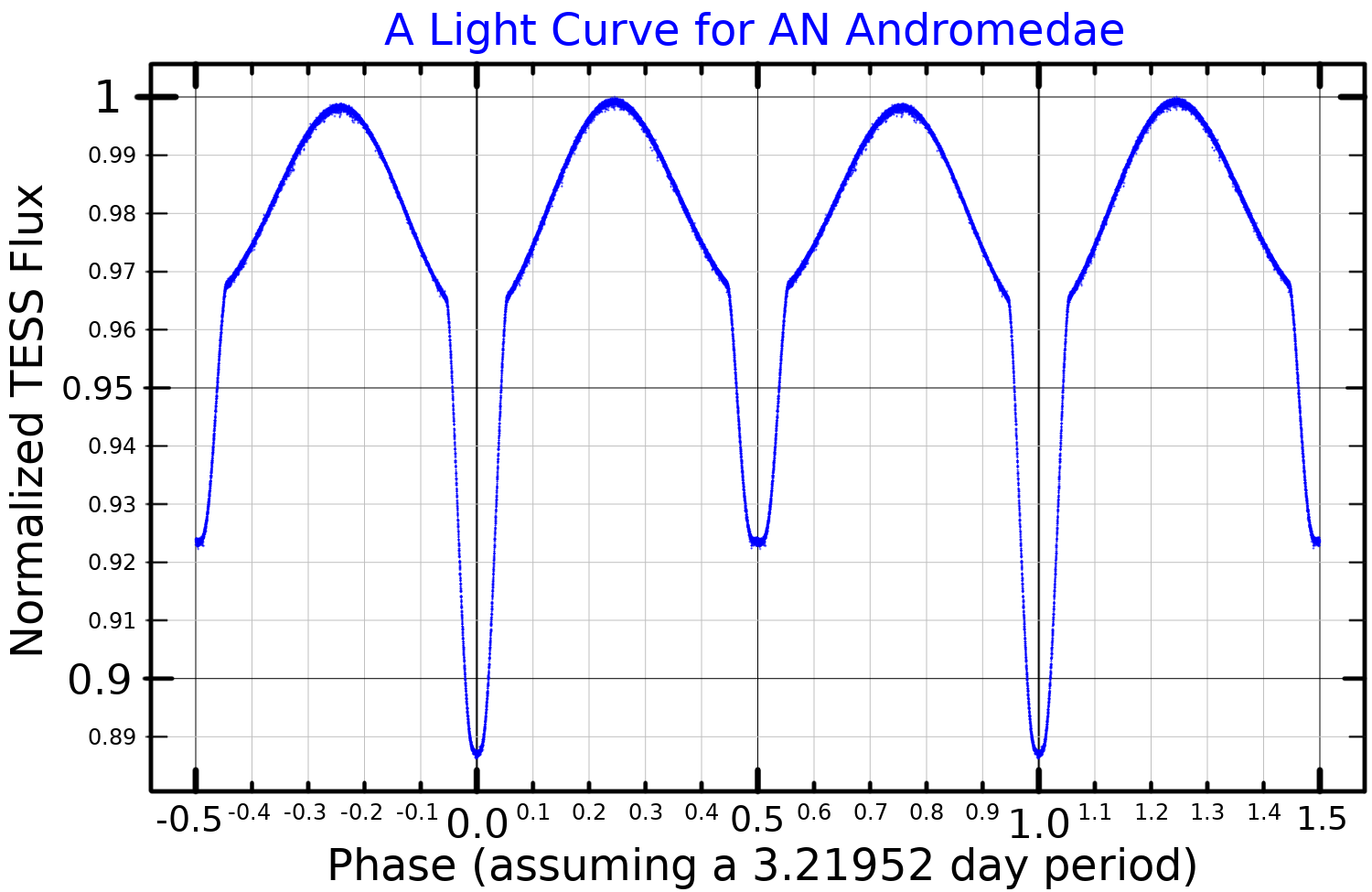
A light curve for AN Andromedae, plotted from TESS data

9 Andromedae, abbreviated 9 And by convention, is a variable binary star system in the northern constellation Andromeda. 9 Andromedae is the Flamsteed designation, while it bears the variable star designation AN Andromedae, or AN And. The maximum apparent visual magnitude of the system is 5.98, which places it near the lower limit of visibility to the human eye. Based upon an annual parallax shift of 7.13 mas, it is located 457 light years from the Earth.

This system was determined to be a single-lined spectroscopic binary in 1916 by American astronomer W. S. Adams, and the initial orbital elements were computed by Canadian astronomer R. K. Young in 1920. The pair orbit each other with a period of 3.2196 days and an eccentricity of 0.03. It is an eclipsing binary, which means the orbital plane is inclined close to the line of sight and, from the perspective of the Earth, the stars pass in front of each other, causing two partial eclipses every orbit. During the transit of the secondary in front of the primary, the visual magnitude drops to 6.16, while the eclipse of the secondary by the primary lowers the net magnitude to 6.09.
