= Ananta Charan Sai Babu =

Indian semi-classical folk dancer

- Born: India
- Occupations: Chhau Dancer, Arts Promoter
- Style: Mayurbhanj Chhau

Ananta Charan Sai Babu(1915–1989) was a Mayurbhanj Chhau dance (UNESCO heritage) practitioner. Born in a family of Chhau performers in Mayurbhanj, he studied under his father Radhamohan Sai and others gurus of Chhau dance such as Dibakar Bhanj Deo and Mohammad Rejak Khan. Ananta Charan Sai died in 1989.

== Career ==
He promoted Chhau dance by teaching many disciples as Head Ustad (maestro) in Baripada in the premier institute of training Chhau dance called Nritya Pratisthan. In 1971 he was awarded with Sangeet Natak Akademi Award His nephew Janmejay Sai Babu who also received the Sangeet Natak Akademi Award for Chhau in 2017 and his two grandnephews Rajesh Sai Babu and Rakesh Sai Babu also continue to promote Chhau dance.
