= Annand =

- Pronunciation: /ˈænænd/

Origin
- Origin: Scotland

Annand is a surname of Scottish origin. Variant forms include Anand (although this is more commonly found as a name of Indian origin).

The roots of the name Annand are found among the Strathclyde-Briton people of the ancient Scottish Borderlands. Annand was originally found in Dumfriesshire.

== Notable people with the surname Annand ==
Notable people with this surname include:

- Bud Annand, Australian rules footballer
- Douglas Annand, Australian graphic designer
- Eddie Annand, Scottish footballer
- Frederick Annand, Australian businessman
- James Annand, Scottish journalist
- James Douglas Annand, Australian politician
- J. K. Annand, a Scottish poet
- Louise Gibson Annand, Scottish painter and film-maker
- Richard Annand, English soldier
- Walter J. D. Annand, Scottish aeronautical academic
- William Annand, Canadian publisher and politician
