= Megheswar Temple =

Coordinates: 20.243317°N 85.856257°E

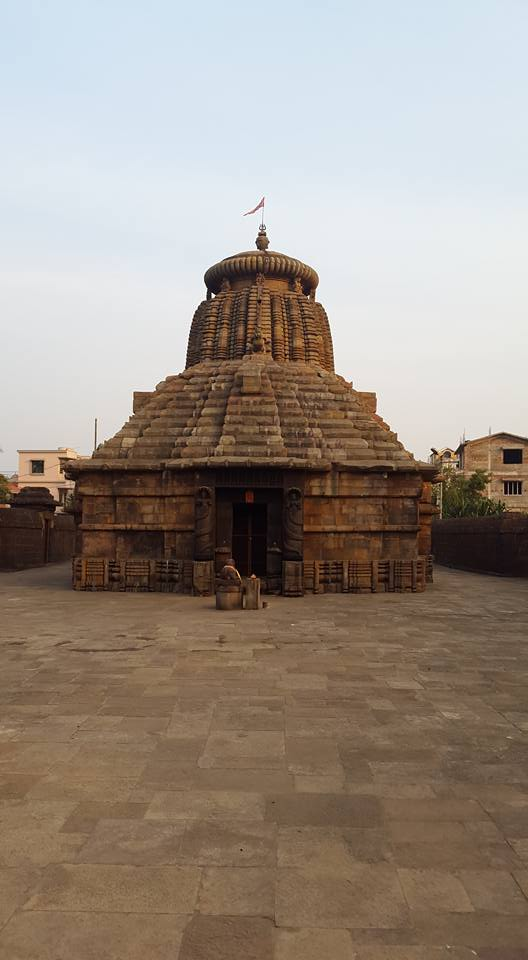
Megheswar temple in old town, Bhubaneswar

The Megheswar Temple is a 12th-century Hindu temple dedicated to the deity Shiva. The temple is located at Tankapani road area in Bhubaneswar, India.

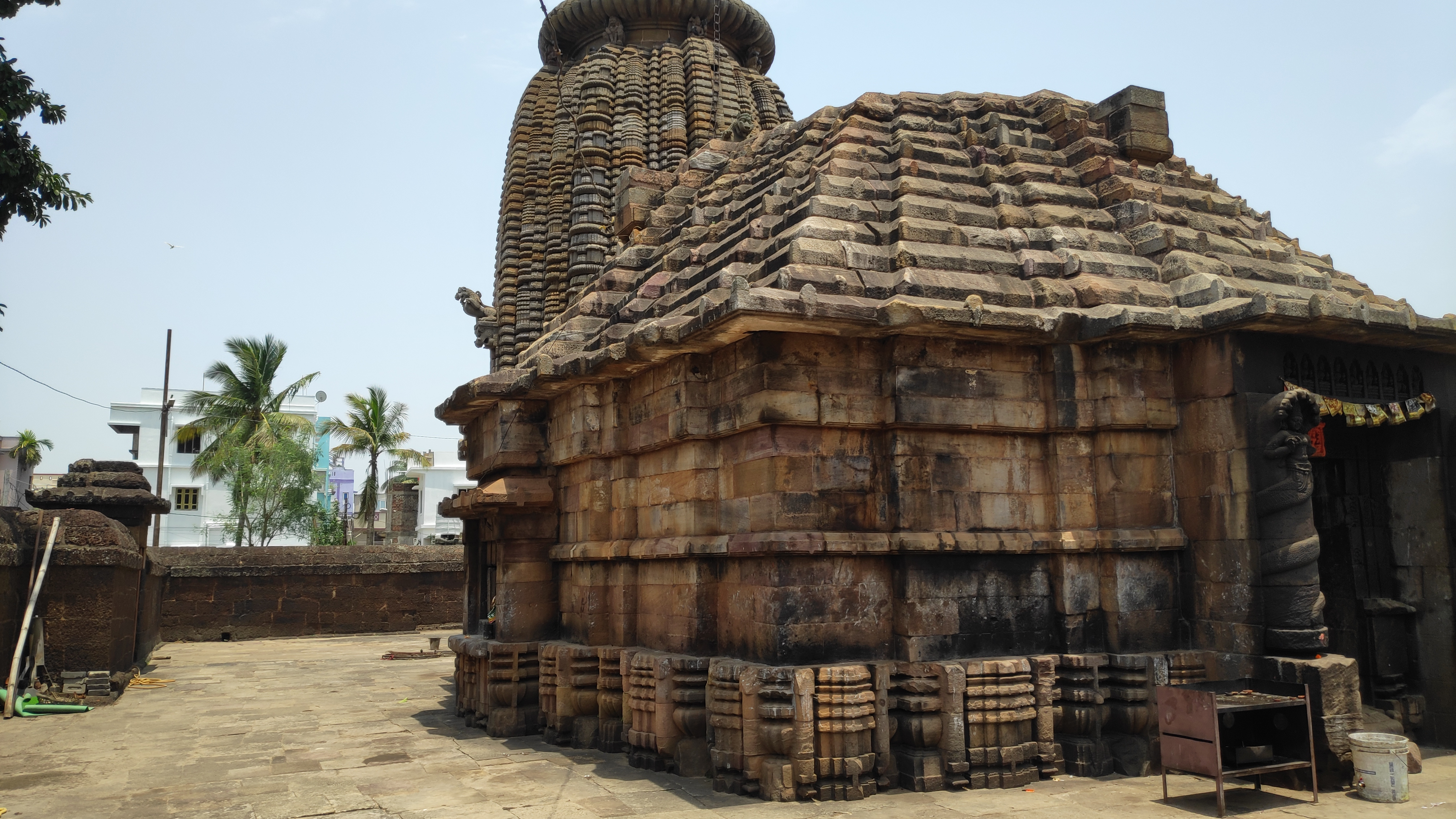
Megheswara temple
