= Ananta Vasudeva Temple =

Hindu temple in Bhubaneswar, India

- ଅନନ୍ତ ବାସୁଦେବ ମନ୍ଦିର
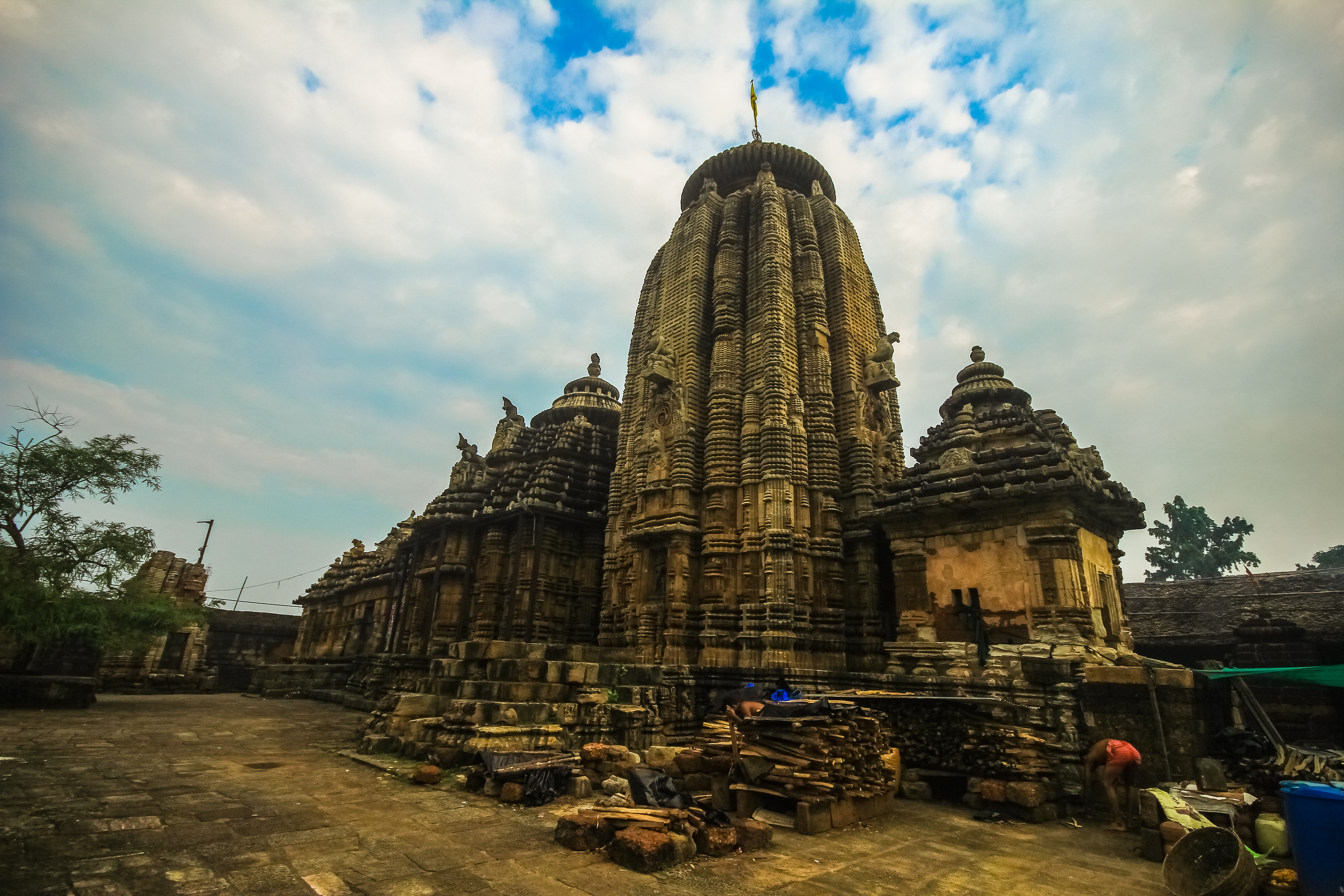
- The Ananta Vasudeva Temple

- Location in Odisha

Religion
- Affiliation: Hinduism
- District: Khurda
- Deity: Ananta Vasudeva (Krishna)

Location
- Location: Bhubaneswar
- State: Odisha
- Country: India
- Coordinates: 20°14′26.18″N 85°50′8.81″E

Architecture
- Type: Kalinga Architecture
- Completed: 13th Century

Ananta Vasudeva Temple ("Temple of the Infinite Vāsudeva", Odia:ଅନନ୍ତ ବାସୁଦେବ ମନ୍ଦିର) is a Hindu temple dedicated to Krishna, an avatar of Vishnu located in Bhubaneswar, the state capital of Odisha, India. The temple was constructed in the thirteenth century, and the complete murtis of Krishna, Balarama and Subhadra are worshipped there. The temple dates back to the period of Chandrika Devi, the daughter of Anangabhima III, during the reign of the king Bhanudeva. A commemorative inscription that marked the foundation of the temple can be found in the British Museum's collection.

== Legend ==
It appears that the original image of Vishnu was worshipped on the spot where the great temple of Ananta Vasudeva was built in the 13th century CE. Thus in the 13th century, Queen Chandrika of Eastern Ganga dynasty was prompted to construct a new temple - the temple of Ananta Vasudeva in this place. There must have been an old temple where this Vishnu image was installed. The Marathas, who extended their empire up to river Mahanadi, were responsible for renovating the Vishnu temple at Bhubaneswar in the late 17th century.

== Architecture ==
In form, the temple resembles the Lingaraj temple, but includes Vaishnavite (Vishnu related) sculptures. The temple has longitudinal bands of miniature shikharas (shrines), exactly like those in Lingaraj temple, with the minor difference that the number of the shikharas forming one longitudinal band in its case is only three. The sculpture in the exterior walls varies in character in each temple in Bhubaneswar. Most of the female sculptures in the temple walls are overly ornamented and lack originality

The sanctum has the icons of Krishna, Balarama, and Subhadra. Balarama stands under a seven-hooded serpent, Subhadra holds pot of jewels and a lotus in her two hands, keeping her left foot over another jewel pot, while Krishna holds a mace, chakra, lotus, and a conch.

== Difference from Jagannath Temple, Puri ==
The idols found in the garbhagrha (sanctum sanctorum) of the temple have complete structure unlike the images of the Jagannath Temple, Puri. Here the shrimurtis (idols) are made of black granite stone, rather than wood, as seen in the Puri temple. For this temple only, the city gains its name as Chakra kshetra (circular place), whereas Puri is named Shankha kshetra (conch-shaped place).

== Gallery ==
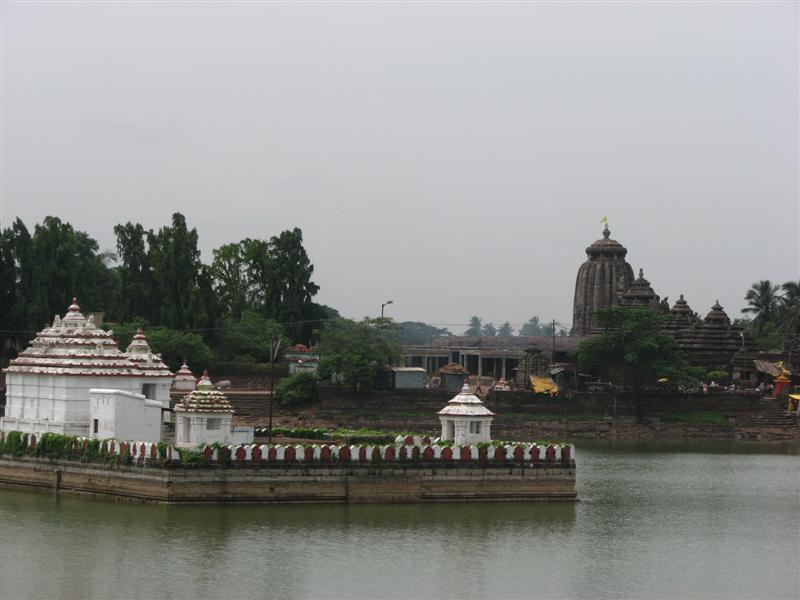
View of Ananta Vasudeva Temple from Bindusagar

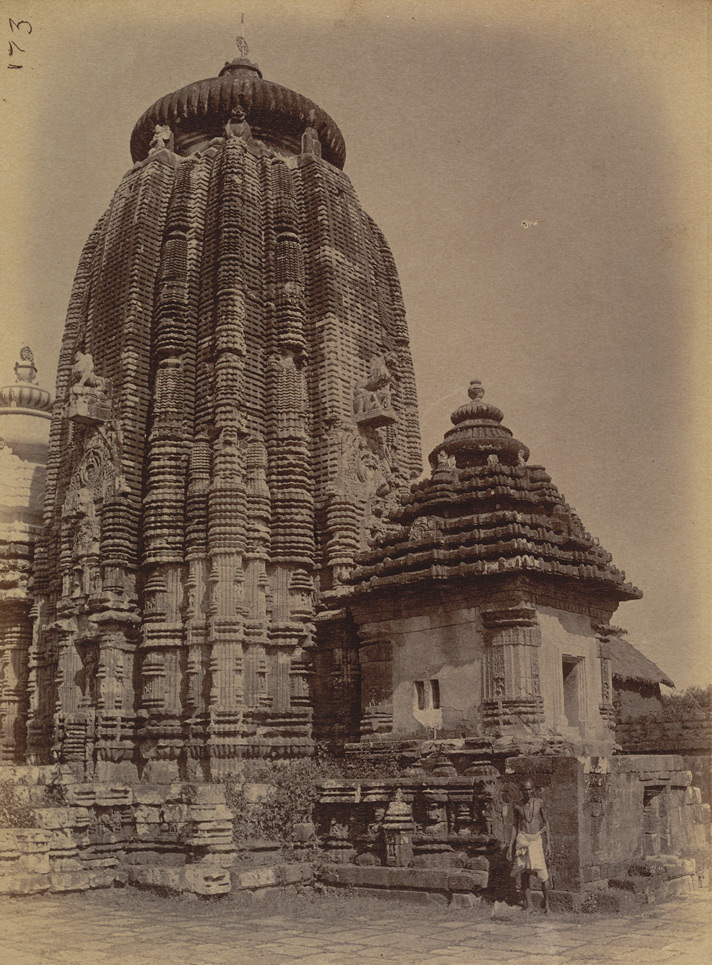
View of Ananta Vasudeva Temple in 1869

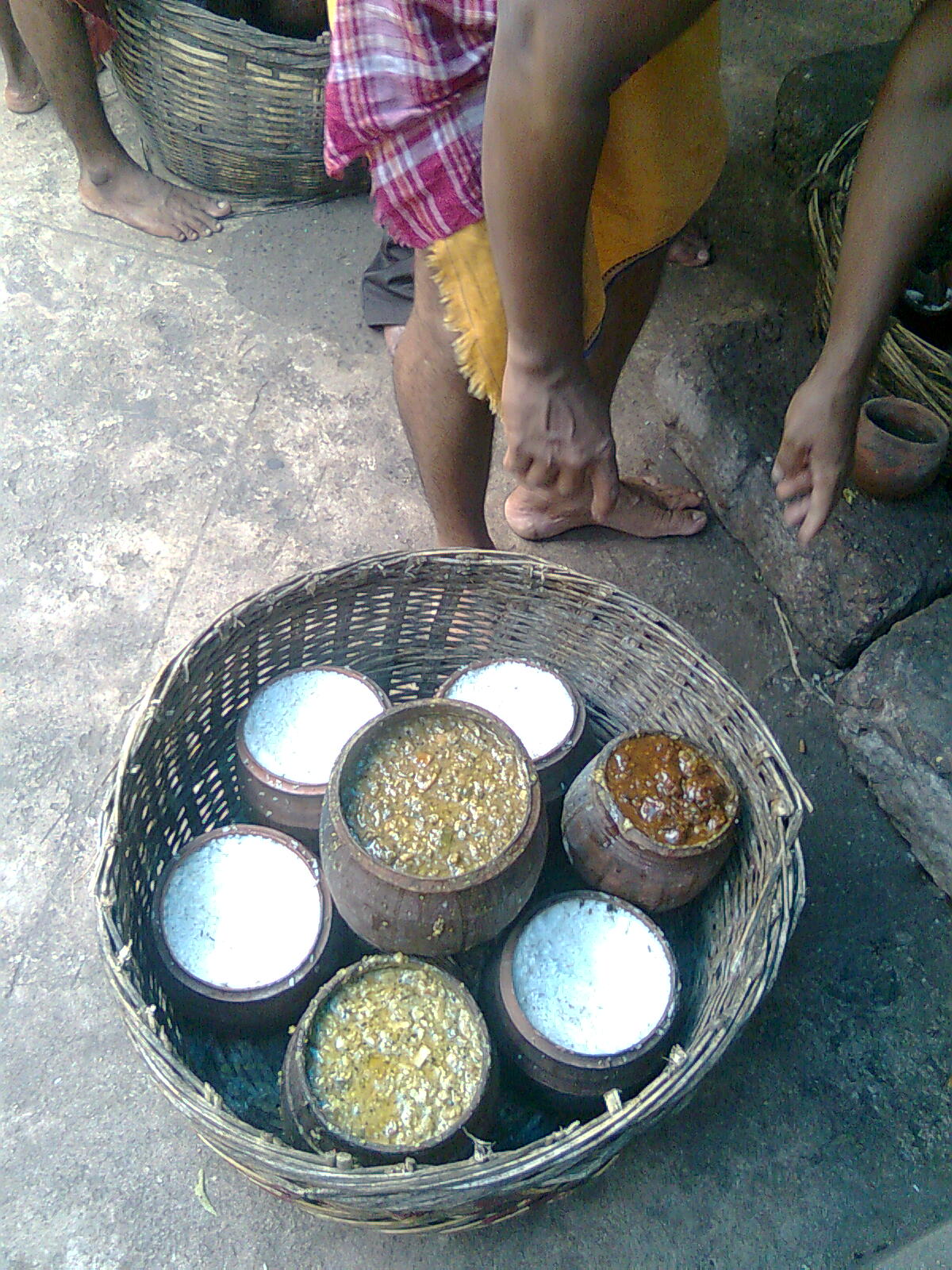
Mahaprasad in Ananta Vasudeva temple

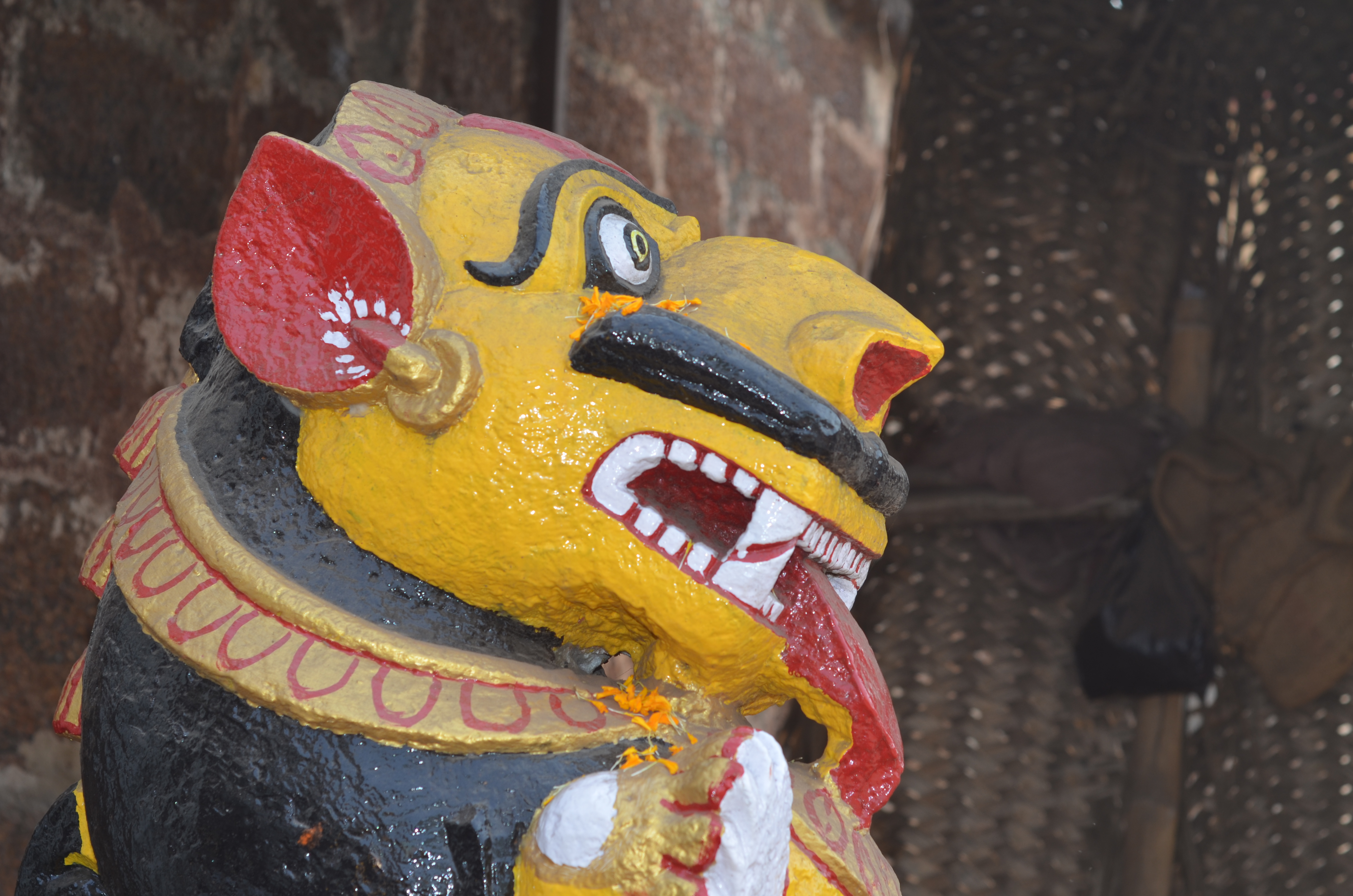
Lion statue in the singhadwara

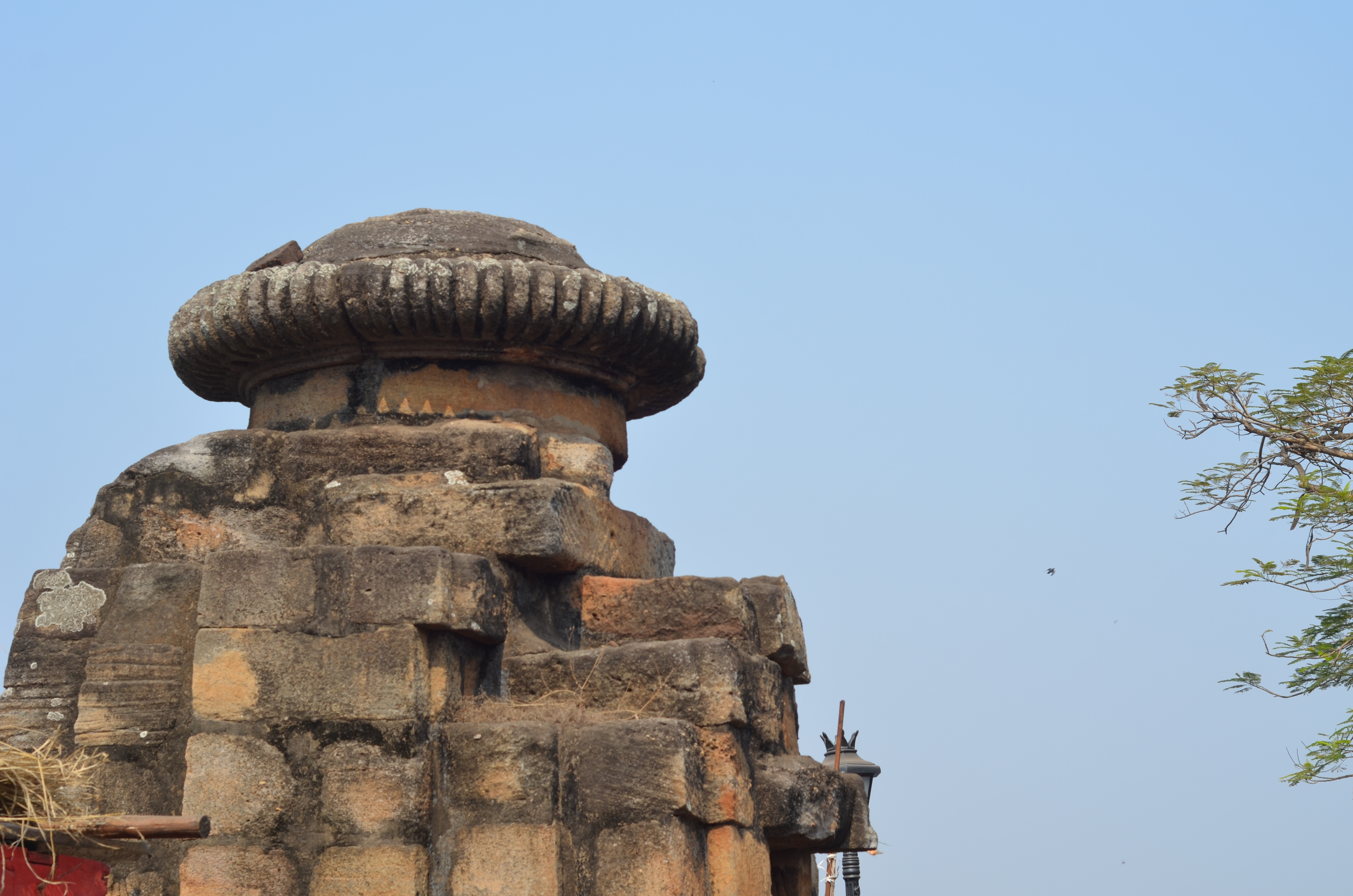
A small broken shrine in the premises

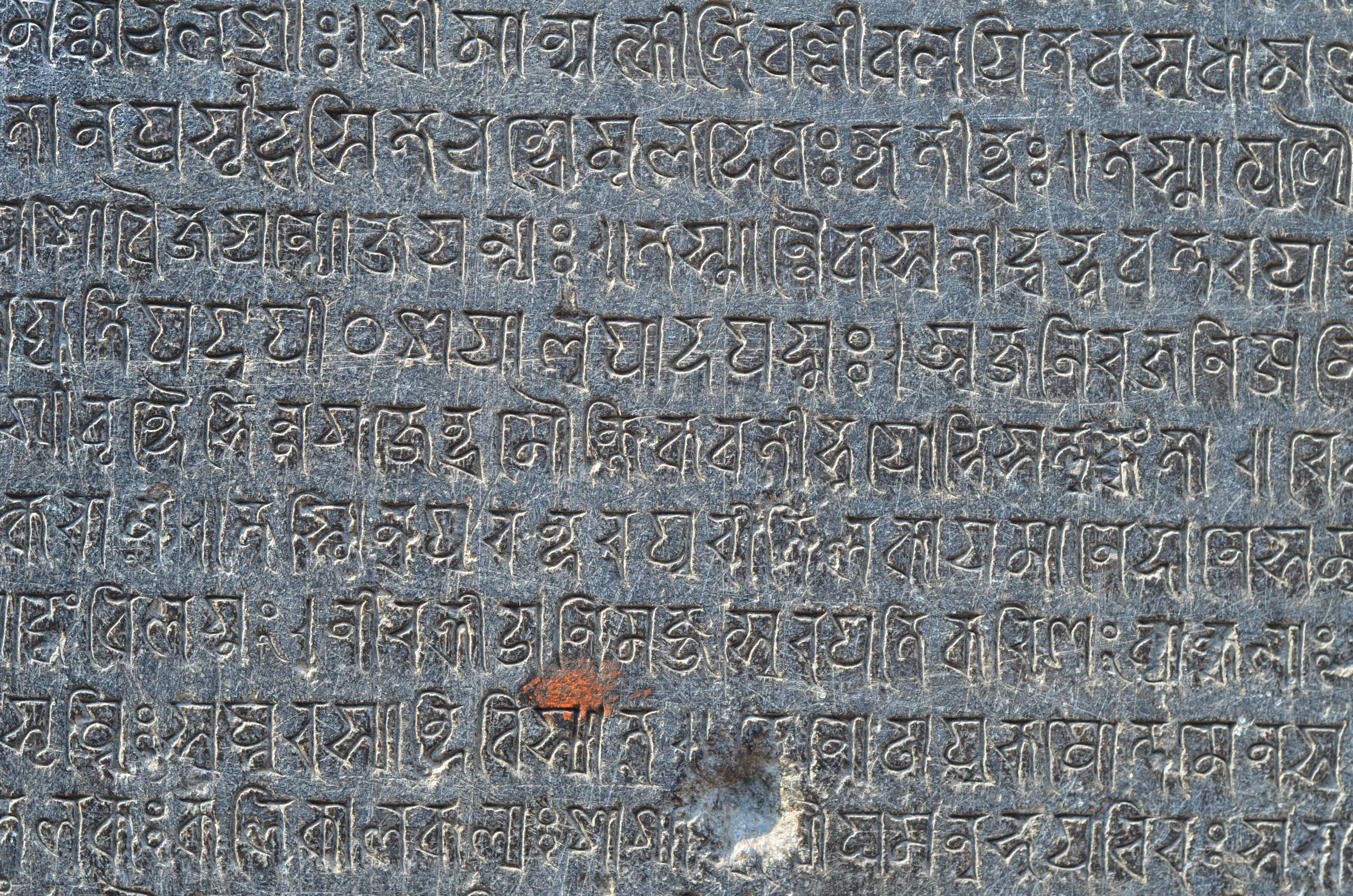
First stone inscription installed in the outer wall

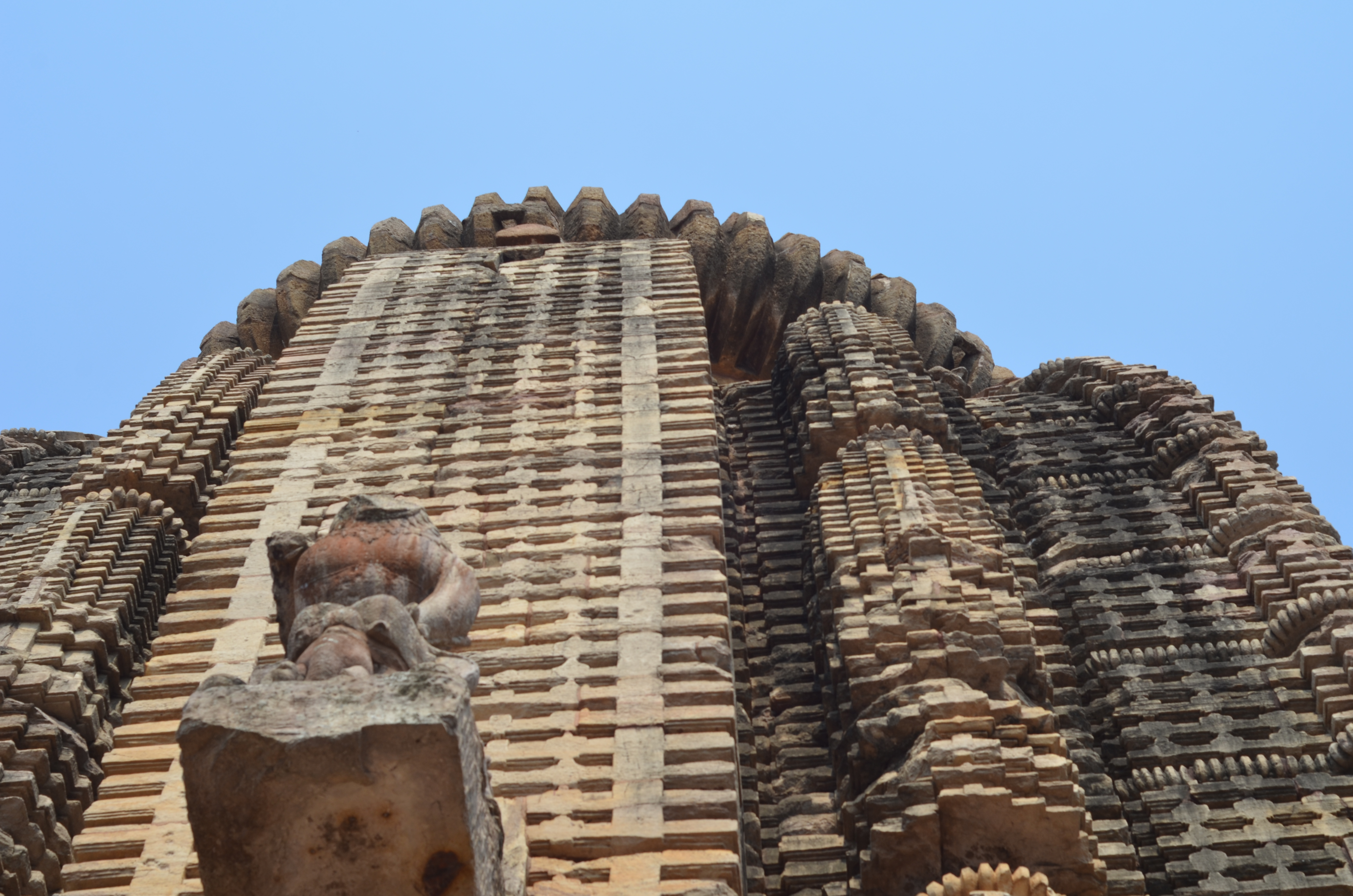
Bimana or Deula

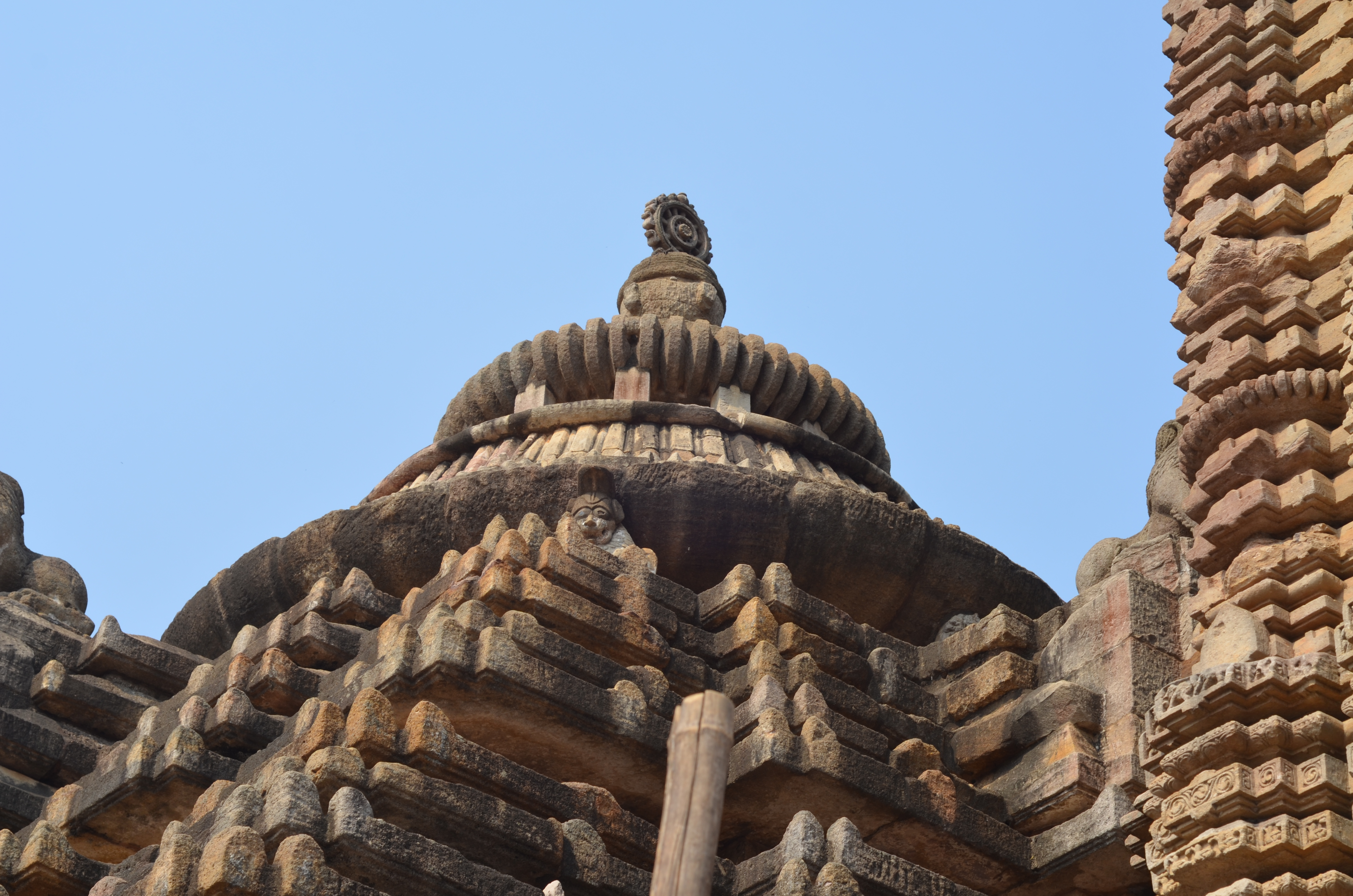
Jagamohana

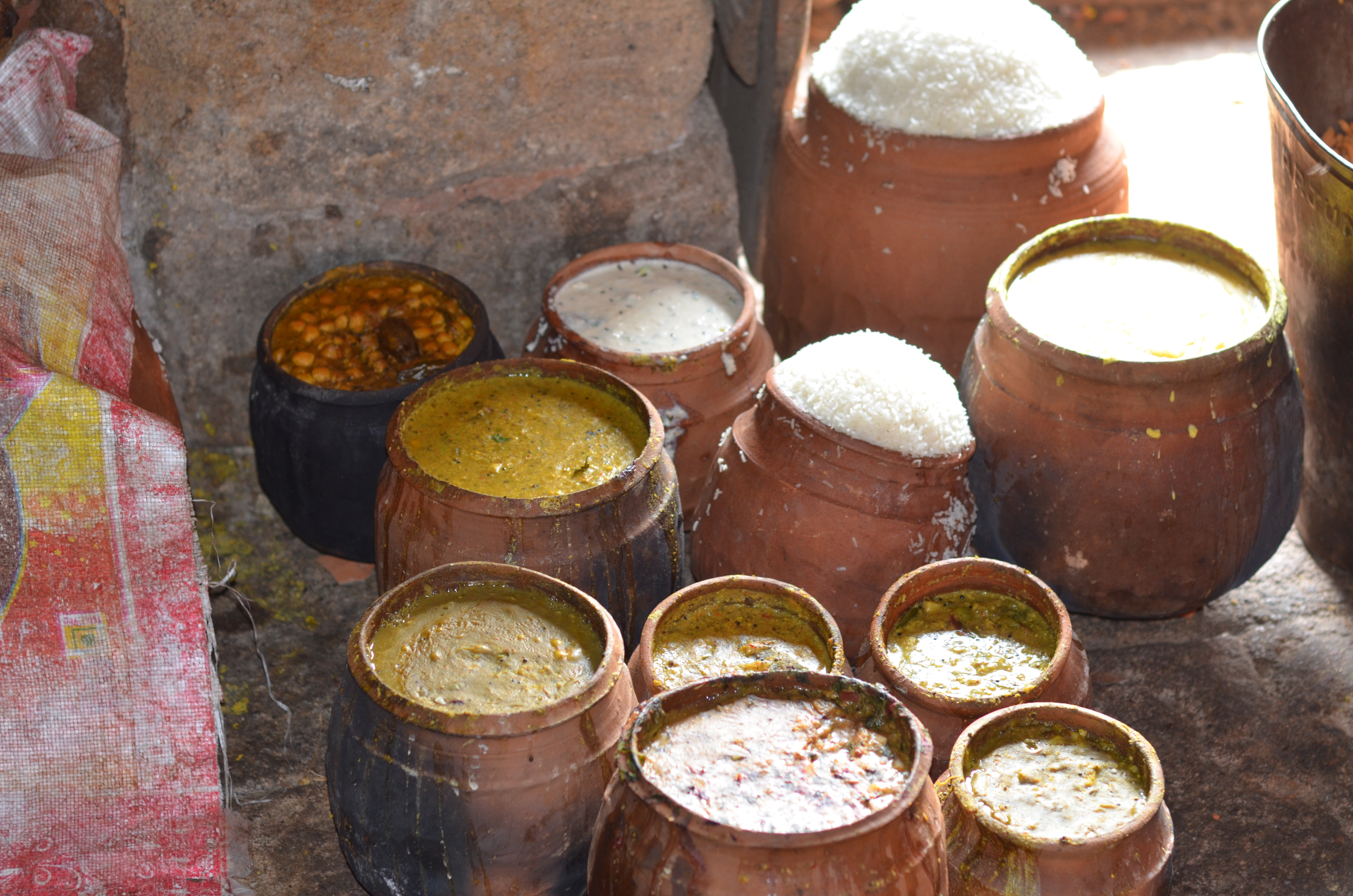
Abadha and Prasada offered to the deities

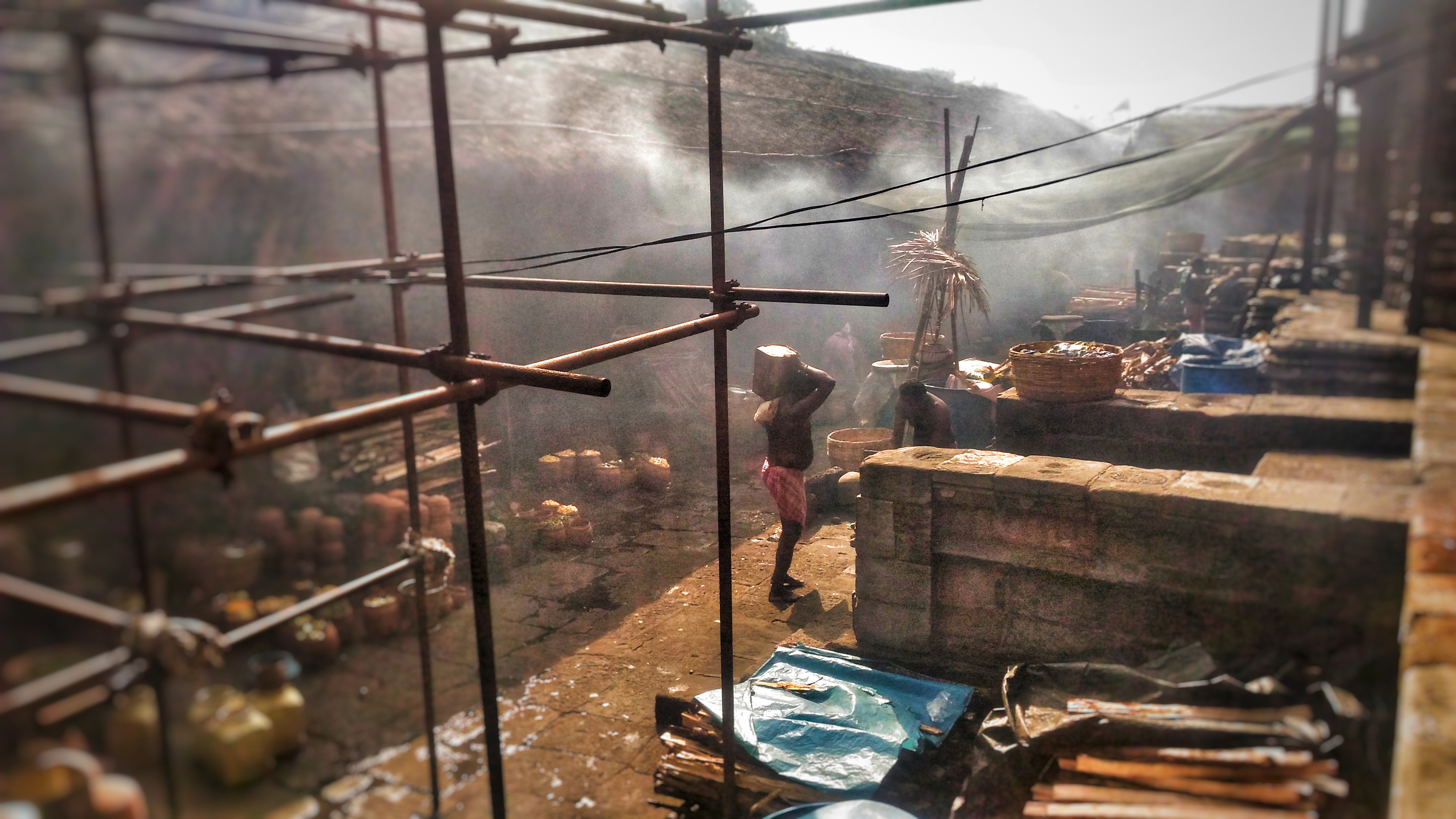
The temple kitchen of the Ananta Basudeba temple in Bhubaneswar, Odisha

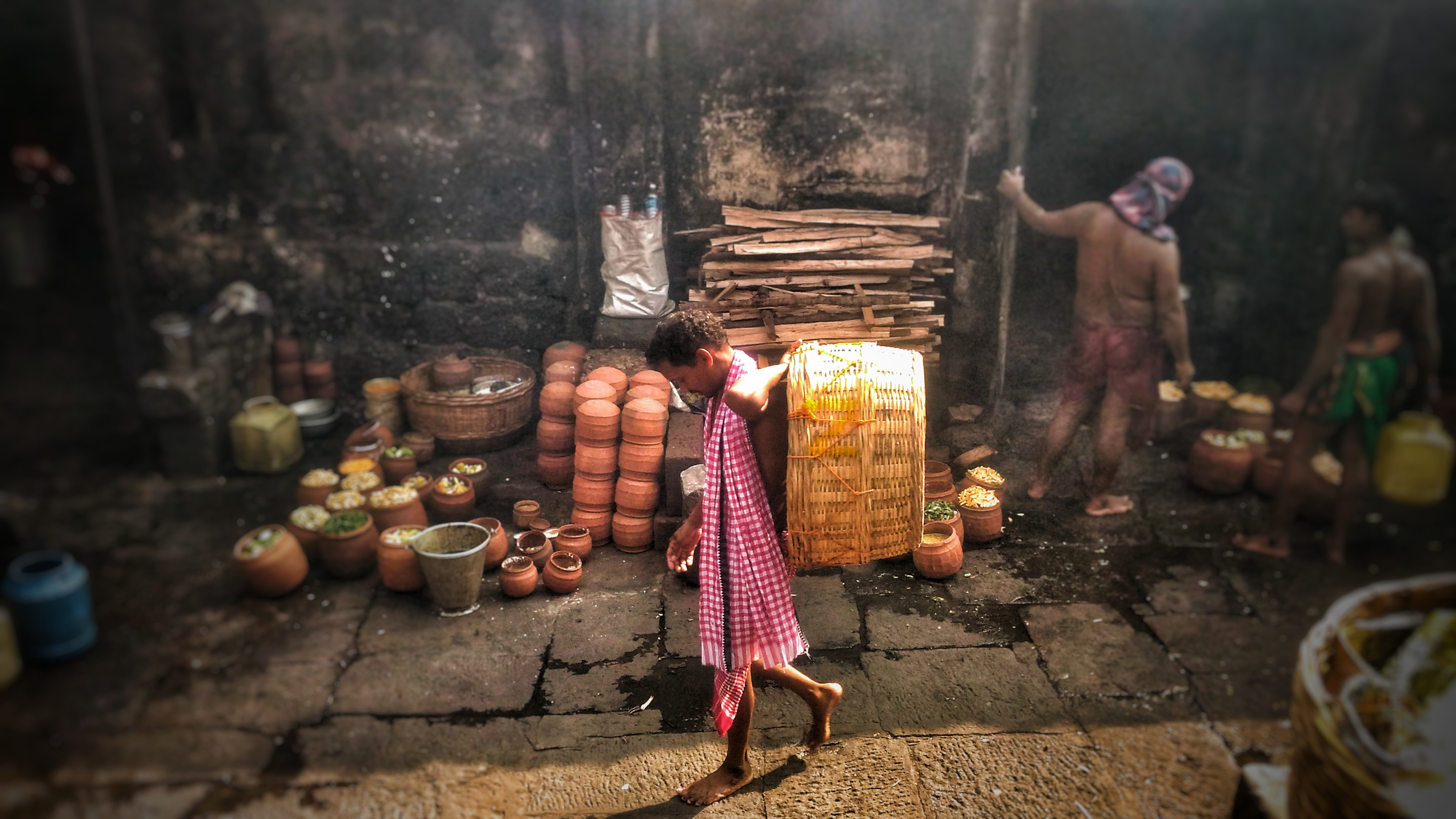
The temple kitchen of the Ananta Basudeba temple in Bhubaneswar, Odisha

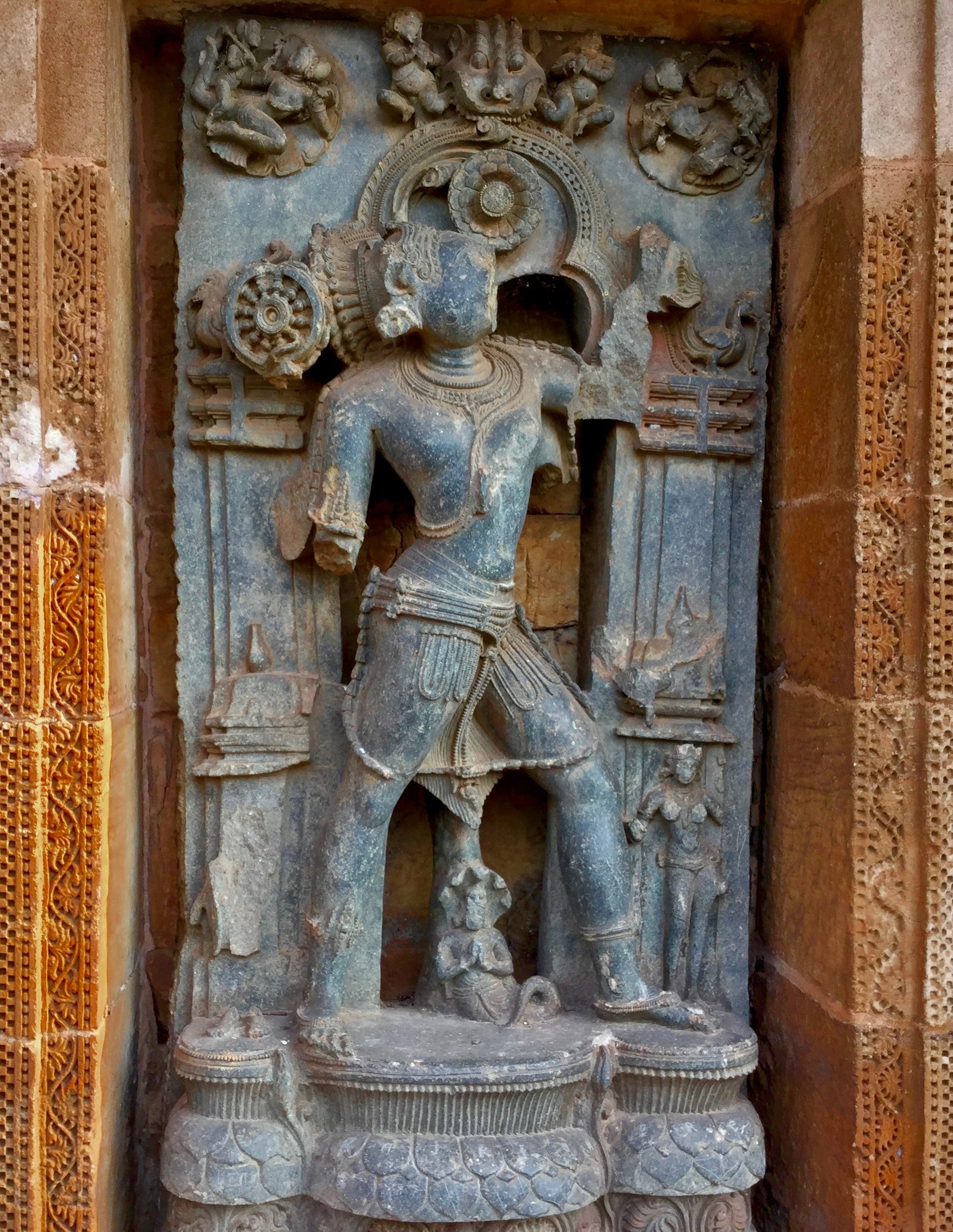
Varaha as a parshvadevata in a niche

== Community Service ==
Many temples in India do community service in the form of serving food, medical assistance, cultural activities, etc. Serving food on special occasions is done by almost all the temples and is known as Prasad. Around one hundred temples in Bhubaneswar serve food to the people in and around the temple area free or at a nominal cost. It helps in preserving traditional Odia recipes. These recipes are automatically introduced to the newer generation as well as to the visiting people from outside the state and India.The taste of the prasad is unique and delicious. It helps to maintain a connection with the ancient roots besides feeding thousands of devotees with dignity and devotion.
