= Ananda (disambiguation) =

Ananda may refer to:

== Hinduism ==
- Ānanda (Hindu philosophy)
- Anandamaya kosha
- Ananda Tandava, a sacred dance of Hindu mythology

== People ==
- Ananda, disciple of the Buddha
- Ananda (King of Anxi), member of Genghis Khan's family
- Ananda Coomaraswamy (1877-1947), Ceylonese metaphysician and art historian
- Ananda Everingham (born 1982), Thai actor and model
- Ananda Jacobs (born 1983), American actress, singer, model, producer, and composer
- Ananda Lewis (1973-2025), American television personality
- Ananda Mahidol (1935-1946), the eighth king of Siam from the Chakri dynasty
- Ananda Marchildon (born 1986), Canadian-Dutch model
- Ananda Mikola (born 1980), Indonesian racecar driver
- Ananda Shankar (1942-1999), Indian musician

== Places ==
- Ananda, Ivory Coast, a town, commune, and sub-prefecture in Ivory Coast
- Ananda College, a school in Sri Lanka
- Ananda Church of Self-Realization
- Ananda Temple, a Buddhist temple in Myanmar

== Arts and media ==
- Ananda (album), a 2006 album by Paulina Rubio
- Ananda Marga, international spiritual and social movement started in India
- Ananda Tandavam (film), a 2008 Tamil film

== See also ==
- Anand (disambiguation)
- Ananta (disambiguation)
- Amanda (disambiguation) – similar spelling
- Sananda (disambiguation)
- Anandhi (disambiguation)
- Ananda Rao (disambiguation)
