= Salepur =

- Town
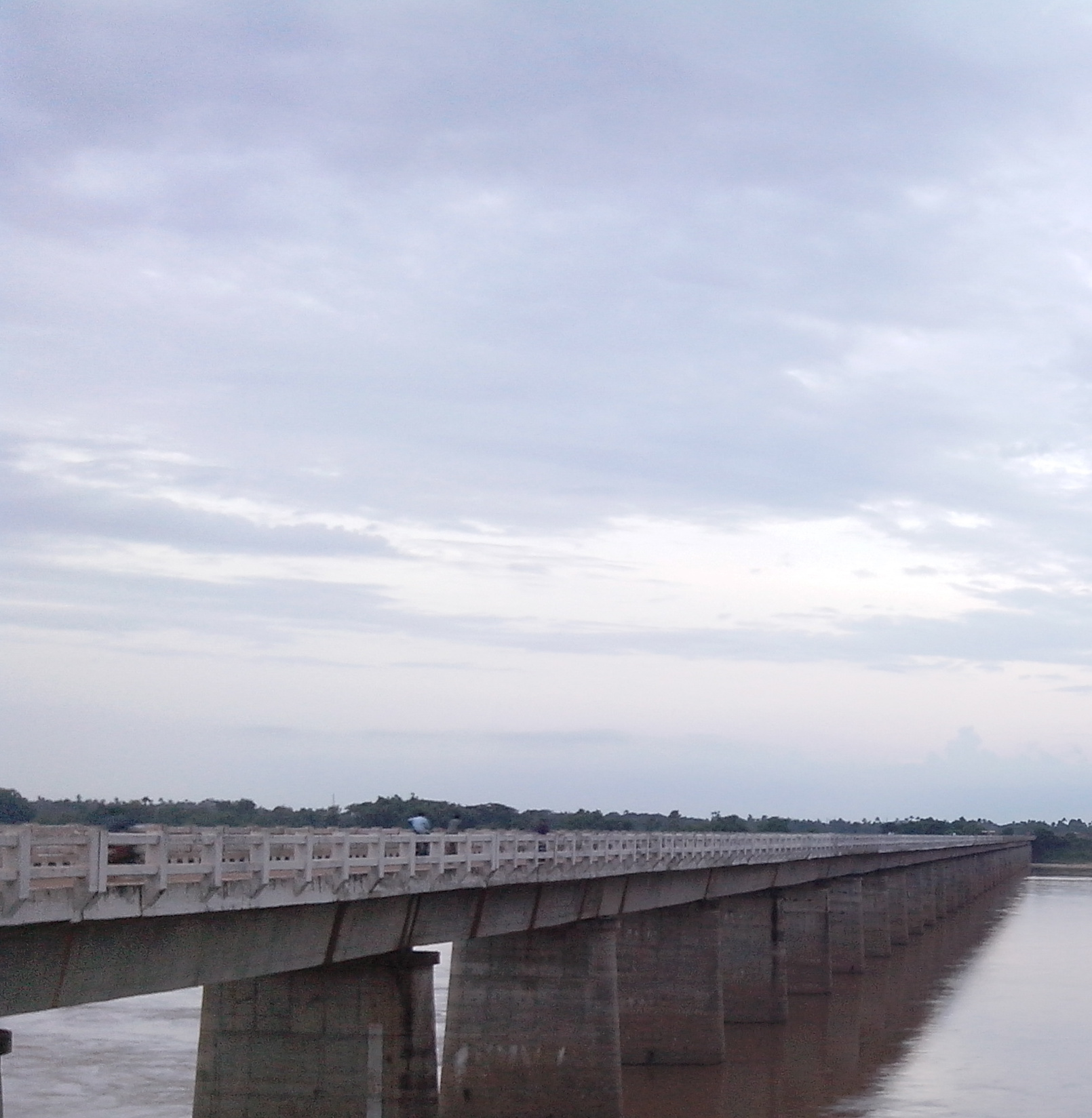
- Chitroptala River Siphon-cum-Bridge

- Location in Odisha, India Salepur (India)
- Coordinates: 20.48°N 86.10°E
- Country: India
- State: Odisha
- District: Cuttack

Government
  - Type: NAC
  - Body: Salepur N.A.C.

Area
  - Total: 205.54 km^{2} (79.36 sq mi)
- Elevation: 27 m (89 ft)

Population (2001)
  - Total: 17,455
  - Density: 850/km^{2} (2,200/sq mi)

Languages
  - Official: Odia
- Time zone: UTC+5:30 (IST)
- PIN: 754202
- Telephone code: 0671
- Vehicle registration: OR-05/OD-05
- Website: odisha.gov.in
- Area and population are for the entire Salepur block.

Salepur is a town and a Notified Area Council in the Cuttack district of Odisha, India.

It is near the bank of the Chitroptala River about 25 km from the city of Cuttack and 55 km from the state capital Bhubaneswar.

== Notable people ==
- Madhusudan Das, lawyer
- Surendra Mohanty, author

== Politics ==
The Member of the Legislative Assembly (MLA) from the Salepur (GE) Assembly Constituency was Prasanta Behera (Kunia Bhai) of (Biju Janata Dal, BJD) as of 2019.
