= Sindian Arrondissement =

- Arrondissement
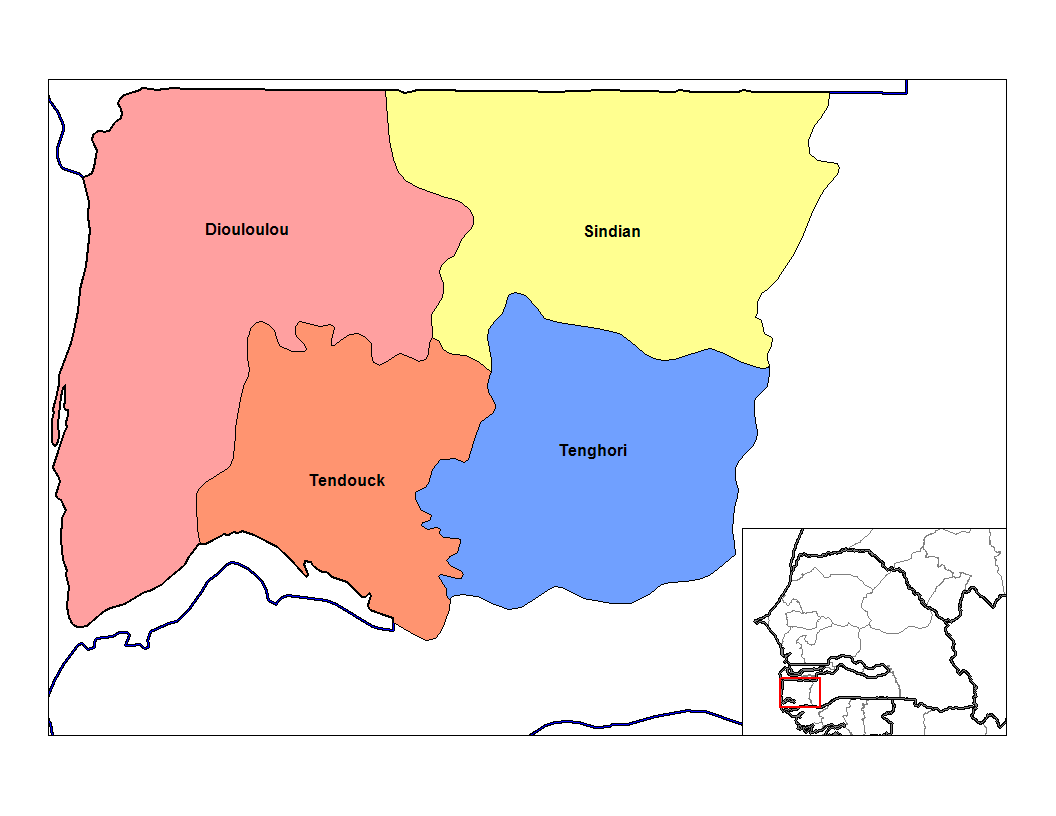
- Location in the Bignona Department
- Coordinates: 12°57′42.12″N 16°10′50.27″W
- Country: Senegal
- Region: Ziguinchor Region
- Department: Bignona Department

Area
  - Total: 1,487 km^{2} (574 sq mi)

Population (2013 census)
  - Total: 42,858
  - Density: 28.82/km^{2} (74.65/sq mi)
- Time zone: UTC±00:00 (GMT)

Sindian Arrondissement is an arrondissement of the Bignona Department in the Ziguinchor Region of Senegal.

== Subdivisions ==
The arrondissement is divided administratively into 4 rural communities and in turn into villages.

Communautés rurales :

Djibidione CR	Oulampane CR	Sindian CR	Suelle CR
59 villages : Bacioucoto-Conboly; Baïpeulh-Frontière; Baïpeung; Bakighaye; Baligname; Balla-Bassène; Balla-Djifalone; Balla-Djiring; Balla-Ougonor; Bassane; Batinding-boudiakère; Batinding-Diémé; Boulayotte; Boulélaye; Boulighoye; Bouliwaye; Brindiago; Broundène; Diaboudior-Frontière; Diaboudior-Tangal; Diacoye-Comboly; Diocadou; Djibiame; Djibidione; Djifanga; Djigoudière; Djiguirone; Djikesse-Kampoudoune; Djilanfary; Djinéa-Diaguibé; Djinéa-Djilacounda; Djinèrev-Niabe; Djiondji; Djiral; Djireme; Djiter; Elob Nadjedian; Elole; Elole-madiédiam; Grand-kanao; Kabounkoute; Kadialouck; Kaégha; Kaléou; Karanaye; Karounor-Djiragone; Karounor-Narang; Katinoro-kaéghor; Kona; Kourègue; Massara, Senegal; Neine; Néma-Djinaré; Niaïré; Niallé; Ougonor; Oupeuth; Petit-balandine; Sitoukène; Siwol; Tambacounda B; Toukara	48 villages : Alacounda; Balankine Nord; Bambatouma; Bassène Kansana; Bassène Mandouer; Bougoutoub-Bany; Bougoutoub-Djinoubor; Boukenoune; Boundiangatte; Bouto; Diabir; Diagoper; Dialinkine; Diamaye-Inor; Diamaye-Kansirani; Diango; Dioudian Kaléou; Dioundane Kantanpor; Djidjirone; Djilonguia; Djinoubor; Djipakoum; Grand Koulaye; Groungoulong; Kaloubaloub; Kandiadiou; Kandialong; Kanfounda; Kankandy; Katimba; Kindiong; Koudioughor; Koulican; Koundioughor; Manbigué Kantafort; Manpalago; Mararan; Marougou; Nialokane; Ouel Kalir; Ouel Mondaye; Oulampane; Silinkine; Sinko; Tandouboune; Yabocounda	17 villages : Bouyème; Diagongue; Djediel; Djinal; Djinéa-Sibogola; Djiniper; Kagnarou; Kakène; Kourouk; Leufeu; Matankigne; Medjedje; Ouniock; Pendite; Sibogola; Silick; Sindian	16 villages : Baïla; Balandine; Batong; Caparan; Diaboudior; Diacoye-Banda; Diatang; Diongol; Djilacounda; Ghoniame; Katinong; Katoudié; Kindieng; Niankitte; Suelle; Talloum

|}
