= Balla =

Balla may refer to:

== Places ==
- Balla (Pieria), an ancient city in Macedonia
- Balla, County Mayo, Ireland
  - Balla railway station
- Balla-Bassène, Senegal
- Balla-Djifalone, Senegal
- Balla-Djiring, Senegal
- Balla (Habiganj) railway station, north-eastern Bangladesh
- Balla village, Karnataka, India
- Balla Union, Tangail District, central Bangladesh

== Music ==
- Balla (musician), Portuguese record producer Armando Teixeira
- Balla et ses Balladins, a dance-music orchestra from Guinea
- Balla (song), a 1979 song by Umberto Balsamo

== People ==
=== Surname ===
==== In arts ====
- Giacomo Balla (1871–1958), Italian painter
- Trace Balla, Australian children's writer and illustrator
- Vivienne Balla (born 1986), Hungarian fine art and fashion photographer

==== In politics ====
- György Balla (born 1962), Hungarian politician
- Mihály Balla (born 1965), Hungarian politician
- Taulant Balla (born 1977), Albanian Socialist Party politician
- Vital Balla, Congolese politician

==== In sport ====
- Ajit Singh Balla (born 1931), Indian high jumper
- Ibrahim Balla (born 1990), Albanian-Australian boxer
- József Balla (1955–2003), Hungarian wrestler
- Mario Balla (1903–1964), Italian water polo player
- Musaeb Abdulrahman Balla (born 1989), Sudanese-born Qatari middle-distance runner
- Qamil Balla (born 1989), Albanian-Australian boxer
- Thomas Balla (born 1936), American fencer
- Virág Balla (born 1994), Hungarian sprint canoeist
- Yassin Ben Balla (born 1996), French footballer

==== Others ====
- Mo Chua of Balla (died 637), founder of Balla, County Mayo
- Valentine de Balla (1899–1957), Hungarian political scientist
- Zoltán von Balla (1883–1945), Hungarian chess player

=== Given name ===
- Balla Camara, Guinean economist and politician
- Balla Fasséké, Sundiata Keita's griot
- Balla Jabir (born 1985), Sudanese footballer
- Balla Moussa Keïta (1934–2001), Malian actor and comedian
- Balla Tounkara, musician and singer from Mali

== See also ==
- Balla GAA, a sports club in Balla, County Mayo
- Bala (disambiguation)
- Ballas (disambiguation)
