= Diouloulou Arrondissement =

- Arrondissement
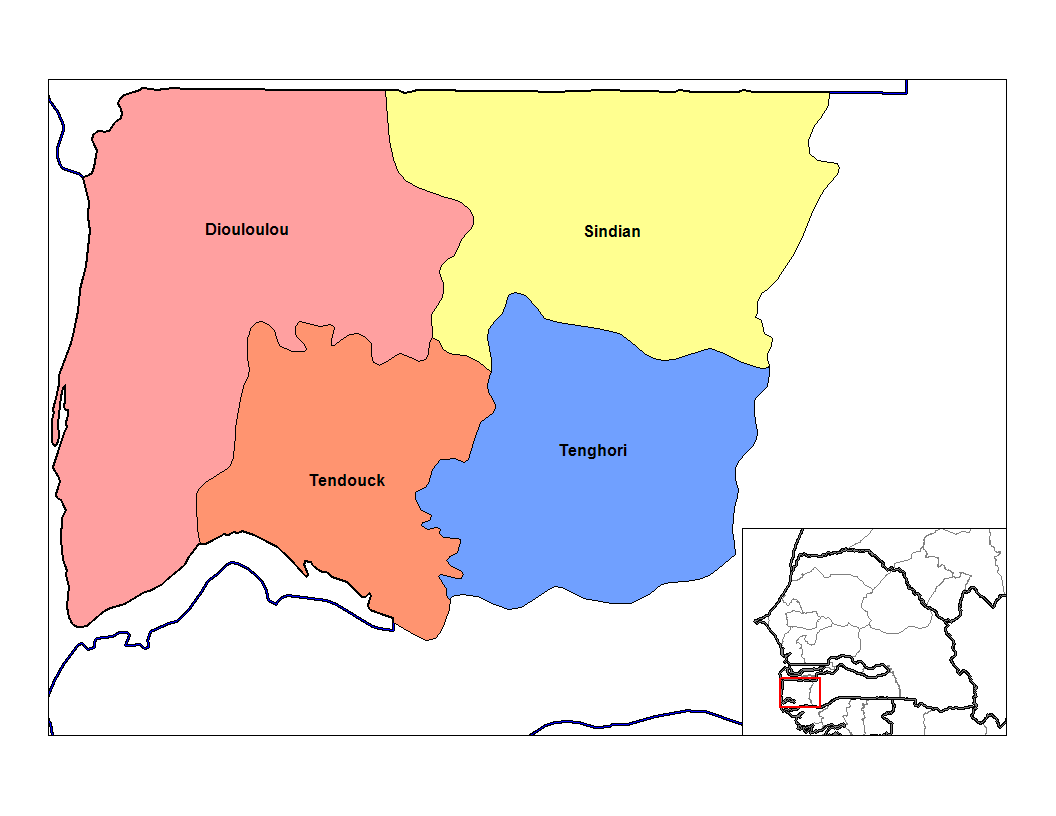
- Location in the Bignona Department
- Country: Senegal
- Region: Ziguinchor Region
- Department: Bignona Department
- Time zone: UTC±00:00 (GMT)

Diouloulou Arrondissement was an arrondissement of the Bignona Department in the Ziguinchor Region of Senegal. It was renamed Kataba Arrondissement when Diouloulou was upgraded to an urban commune in 2008.

== Subdivisions ==
The arrondissement was divided administratively into 3 rural communities and in turn into villages.
