= Mahamouda =

- Village
- Location in Senegal
- Coordinates: 12°58′24″N 16°30′25″W
- Country: Senegal
- Region: Ziguinchor
- Department: Bignona
- Arrondissement: Kataba
- Commune: Djinaki

Population (2002)
  - Total: 459
- Time zone: UTC+0 (GMT)

Mahamouda or Mahamouda Cherif is a village in the Bignona Department of the Ziguinchor Region of southwestern Senegal. In 2002 the village had a population of 459 people. It lies along the N5 road, which connects it directly to the town of Diouloulou in the northwest.
