= Diénoucounda =

- Village
- Country: Senegal
- Region: Ziguinchor
- Department: Bignona
- Arrondissement: Kataba
- Commune: Kataba I

Population (2002)
  - Total: 93
- Time zone: UTC+0 (GMT)

Diénoucounda is a village in the rural commune of Diouloulou, in the Bignona Department of the Ziguinchor Region of southwestern Senegal. In 2002 it had a population of 93 people.
