= Kabiline =

- Village
- Location in Senegal
- Coordinates: 12°58′0″N 16°33′24″W
- Country: Senegal
- Region: Ziguinchor
- Department: Bignona
- Arrondissement: Kataba
- Commune: Djinaki

Population (2002)
  - Total: 3,258
- Time zone: UTC+0 (GMT)

Kabiline is a large village in the Bignona Department of the Ziguinchor Region of southwestern Senegal. In 2002 the village had a population of 3258 people. Surrounded by rivers, it is connected by a road which leads to the N5 road, which connects it directly to the district seat of Diouloulou in the northwest.

In 1982 a group named Entente Kabiline emerged in the village. In the early 1990s several people were murdered in Kabiline, including Kalifa Didhiou, a former political prisoner, and Famara Mary, a peasant farmer who was executed on 24 June 1990 by soldiers.

The village contains Kabiline Primary School.
