= Abéné =

Abéné Abene, Abémé, Abeme
- Village
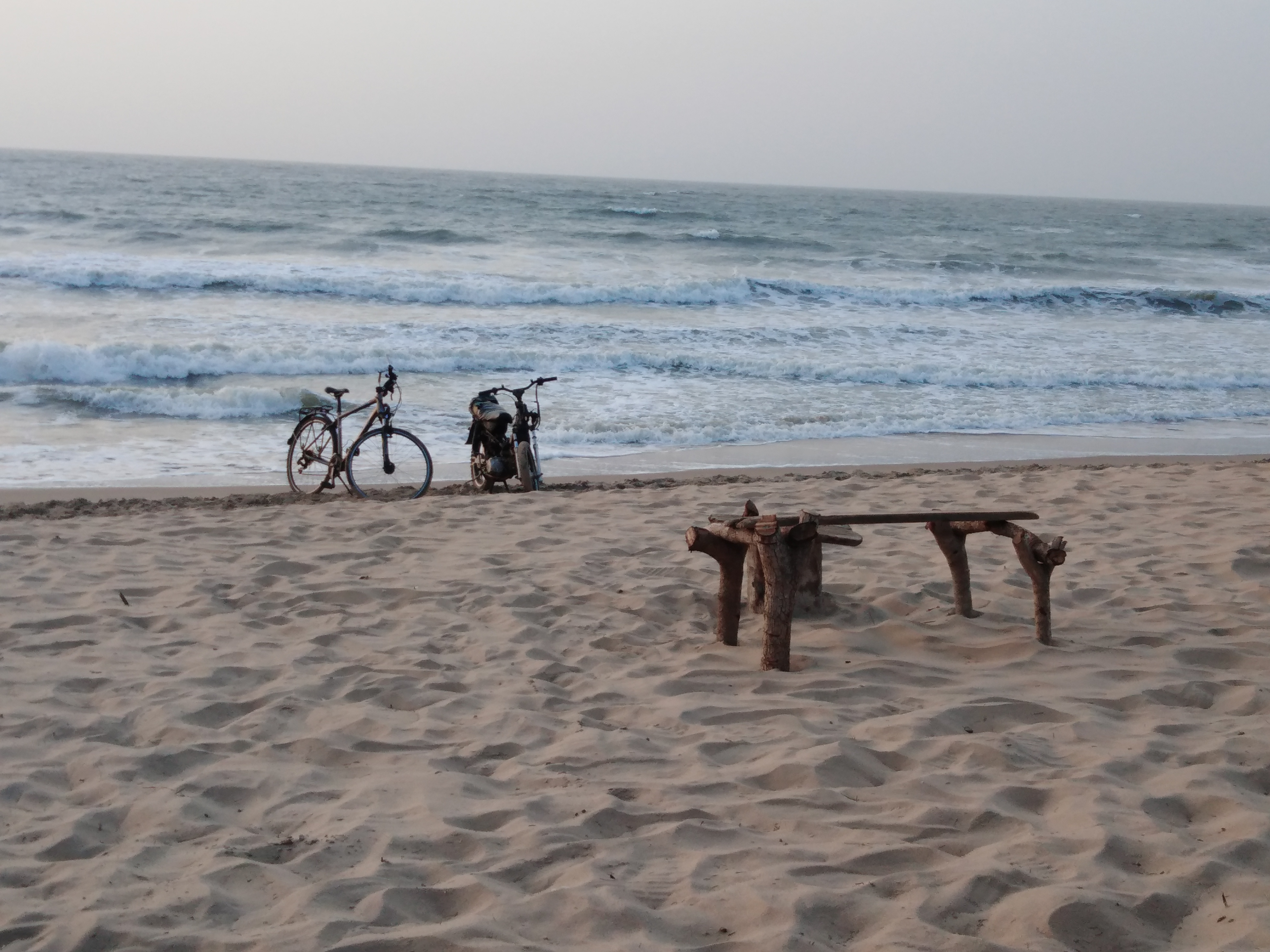

- Location in Senegal
- Coordinates: 13°0′0″N 16°44′00″W
- Country: Senegal
- Region: Ziguinchor
- Department: Bignona
- Arrondissement: Kataba
- Rural community: Kafountine

Population (2002)
  - Total: 1,935
- Time zone: UTC±00:00

Abéné (also called Abene, Abémé, or Abeme) is a village in the rural community of Kafountine, Kataba Arrondissement, Bignona Department, Ziguinchor Region, in the Basse Casamance area of south-west Senegal. It is located on the Atlantic coast.

== Geography ==
The nearest towns are Folonko, Allahein, Niafourang, Kabadio, Kérouané, Albreda, Kafountine, and Diana.

=== Population ===
According to PEPAM (Water and Sanitation Program for the Millennium), there were 1935 people and 269 households in Abéné at the 2002 census.

=== Economy ===
With its beautiful beaches, local tourism is growing rapidly. A djembe festival called Abéné Festivalo is organized in the village every year.
