= Thiobon =

- Village
- Location in Senegal
- Coordinates: 12.8750°N 16.5492°W
- Country: Senegal
- Region: Ziguinchor
- Department: Bignona
- Arrondissement: Tendouck
- Elevation: 6 m (20 ft)

Population (2002)
  - Total: 1,387

Thiobon is a village of Senegal, located in lower Casamance, in the northeast of the subprefecture of Tendouck, 42 km from Bignona and 72 km from Ziguinchor. It is part of the Kartiack Rural community, in Tendouck Arrondissement, Bignona Department, Ziguinchor.

Creeks separate the village is from Baïla to the north and from Diouloulou and the islands of Carones and Carabane to the west. It is bordered on the south by the village of Mlomp and on the east by the village of Kartiack. Thiobon includes several uninhabited islands (Diadédiome, Koudièle, Djiyinène, Kayène-hourer, Kahahène, Diendiènaye, Kareugheul, Taminang, Houtanghate-Kouseumpoul, Houssoudia, Mainduènou) where rice farming is carried out and bird nesting site called Houlèouteuhou. Thiobon can be accessed by river or by road (Boucle du Blouf).

The town is made up of five quarters: Amanque, Dablé, Erindian, Kabine and Kafone.

== Population ==
In the last census (2002), the village contained 1,387 inhabitants and 193 households. The main religion is Islam and the main economic activities are agriculture, animal husbandry, fishing, handicrafts and commerce.

== Social organisation ==
The village is structured around an association, a GIE, and a women's group (GPF).

The Association pour la Rénovation de Thiobon (ASSORETH) is the largest structure of the group because it contains residents and citizens. The members meet annually in a general assembly at which the problems facing the village are discussed and solutions are proposed. The association is funded solely by contributions from its members which are fixed at ten thousand CFA francs waged and a thousand CFA francs unwaged. These contributions are used by the village to carry out projects in the areas of education, health, etc.

In order to attain its economic, social and cultural development objectives, the village of Thiobon held its first cultural festival from 24 to 31 December 2011. This initiative was intended to reinforce the unity of the village youth.

Following the success of this festival, the village decided to make it an annual event. It was held for the second time from 2 to 4 April 2013, during the Easter holiday, immediately after ASSORETH's general assembly. The new date reflected feedback received from the first event - December coincides with the harvest and this had reduced the ability of women to participate in the daytime activities of the first event. The theme of the second event was "Peace and Protection of the Environment for the Development of Casamance."
