= Djibara =

- Village
- Interactive map of Djibara
- Coordinates: 13°05′34″N 16°23′32″W
- Country: Senegal
- Region: Ziguinchor
- Department: Bignona
- Arrondissement: Kataba
- Commune: Kataba I

Population (2002)
  - Total: 254
- Time zone: UTC+0 (GMT)

Djibara is a village in the rural commune of Kataba I, in the Bignona Department of the Ziguinchor Region of southwestern Senegal. In 2002 it had a population of 254 people.
