= Djinaki =

- Town and rural commune
- Location in Senegal
- Coordinates: 12°56′34″N 16°27′18″W
- Country: Senegal
- Region: Ziguinchor
- Department: Bignona
- Arrondissement: Kataba

Population (2002)
  - Total: 1,226
- Time zone: UTC+0 (GMT)

Dijinaki or Dijinaky is a small town and rural commune in the Bignona Department of the Ziguinchor Region of southwestern Senegal. In 2002 the town had a population of 1226 people, while the overall rural commune had a population of 16,553 people. It lies along the N5 road, which connects it directly to the town of Diouloulou in the northwest, passing through the small towns of Mahamouda and Karantaba along the way.

== History ==
In June 2001, the Senegalese army set up a military post in the town, prompting the North Front to resume arms.

== Geography ==
=== Settlements ===
The rural commune contains the following settlements. The population in 2002 is given in brackets:

- Badiana (1698)
- Baline (449)
- Balonguir (521)
- Baranlir (880)
- Belaye (745)
- Biti Biti (641)
- Brikamanding (305)
- Coussabel (325)
- Dioucoune (288)
- Djinaki (1226)
- Djinone (487)
- Djinoudie (529)
- Ebinako (501)
- Ebinkine (1222)
- Esson (665)
- Kabiline (3258)
- Kakaré (281)
- Karongue (518)
- Kateum Tema (156)
- Mahamouda (459)
- Mongone (306)
- Ndenbane (85)
- Tandine (455)
- Wangarang (273)
