= Medina Yacine Ba =

Hamlet in Ziguinchor Region, Senegal

Médina Yacine Ba
- Hamlet
- Location in Senegal
- Coordinates: 12°39′N 16°10′W
- Country: Senegal
- Region: Ziguinchor
- Department: Bignona
- Arrondissement: Coubalan
- Elevation: 2 m (6.6 ft)

Population (1988)
  - Total: 58

Médina Yacine Ba is a hamlet (French: hameau) in the rural community of Coubalan, which located in Tenghori Arrondissement and Bignona Department, a subdivision of the Ziguinchor Region in the historical region of Casamance in the south-west of the country. In 1988, 58 people lived there.
