= Barakesse =

Coordinates: 13°07′N 16°28′W

- Village
- Country: Senegal
- Region: Ziguinchor
- Department: Bignona
- Arrondissement: Kataba
- Commune: Kataba I

Population (2002)
  - Total: 385
- Time zone: UTC+0 (GMT)

Barakesse is a village in the rural commune of Kataba I, in the Bignona Department of the Ziguinchor Region of south-western Senegal. In 2002 it had a population of 385 people.
