= Bakassouck =

- Location in Senegal
- Coordinates: 12°42′10″N 16°43′17″W
- Country: Senegal
- Region: Ziguinchor
- Department: Bignona
- Arrondissement: Katataba
- Rural community: Kafountine
- Time zone: UTC+0 (GMT)

Bakassouck is a settlement in Bignona Department in Ziguinchor Region in Senegal.

In the 2002 census its population was recorded as 324 inhabitants in 45 households.
