= Daroukairy =

Coordinates: 13.0500°N 16.5667°W

- Village
- Interactive map of Daroukairy
- Country: Senegal
- Region: Ziguinchor
- Department: Bignona
- Arrondissement: Kataba
- Commune: Kataba I

Population (2002)
  - Total: 577
- Time zone: UTC+0 (GMT)

Daroukairy is a village in the rural commune of Kataba I, in the Bignona Department of the Ziguinchor Region of southwestern Senegal. In 2002 it had a population of 577 people.
