= Dimbaya =

Coordinates: 13°10′N 16°38′W

- Village
- Interactive map of Dimbaya
- Country: Senegal
- Region: Ziguinchor
- Department: Bignona
- Arrondissement: Kataba
- Commune: Kataba I

Population (2002)
  - Total: 213
- Time zone: UTC+0 (GMT)

Dimbaya is a village in the rural commune of Kataba I, in the Bignona Department of the Ziguinchor Region of southwestern Senegal. In 2002 it had a population of 213 people.
