= Boulindieng =

- Location in Senegal
- Coordinates: 12°41′5″N 16°8′58″W
- Country: Senegal
- Region: Ziguinchor
- Department: Bignona
- Arrondissement: Tenghory
- Commune: Coubalan

Population (2002)
  - Total: 152
- Time zone: UTC+0 (GMT)

Boulindieng is a settlement in the Bignona Department of Ziguinchor Region of Senegal. It had a population of 502 in 2002.
