= Djibaly =

- Village
- Interactive map of Djibaly
- Coordinates: 13°03′37″N 16°35′44″W
- Country: Senegal
- Region: Ziguinchor
- Department: Bignona
- Arrondissement: Kataba
- Commune: Kataba I

Population (2002)
  - Total: 52
- Time zone: UTC+0 (GMT)

Djibaly is a village in the rural commune of Kataba I, in the Bignona Department of the Ziguinchor Region of southwestern Senegal. In 2002 it had a population of 52 people.
