= Kounkoudiang =

- Village
- Location in Senegal
- Coordinates: 13°03′30″N 16°41′05″W
- Country: Senegal
- Region: Ziguinchor
- Department: Bignona
- Arrondissement: Kataba
- Commune: Kataba I

Population (2002)
  - Total: 162
- Time zone: UTC+0 (GMT)

Kounkoudiang is a village in the rural commune of Kataba I, in the Bignona Department of the Ziguinchor Region of southwestern Senegal. In 2002 it had a population of 162 people.
