= Kataba II =

- Village
- Interactive map of Kataba II
- Coordinates: 13°01′11″N 16°34′01″W
- Country: Senegal
- Region: Ziguinchor
- Department: Bignona
- Arrondissement: Kataba
- Commune: Kataba I

Population (2002)
  - Total: 520
- Time zone: UTC+0 (GMT)

Kataba II is a village in the rural commune of Kataba I, in the Bignona Department of the Ziguinchor Region of southwestern Senegal. In 2002 it had a population of 520 people.
