= Balankine Sud =

- Village
- Location in Senegal
- Coordinates: 12°53′21″N 15°59′10″W
- Country: Senegal
- Region: Ziguinchor
- Department: Bignona
- Arrondissement: Tenghory
- Rural community: Ouonck

Population (2002)
  - Total: 252
- Time zone: UTC+0 (GMT)

Balankine Sud is a village in the rural commune of Ouonck, in the Bignona Department of the Ziguinchor Region of Senegal. In 2002 it had a population of 252 people.
