= Boulendor =

- Location in Senegal
- Coordinates: 12°44′43″N 16°02′53″W
- Country: Senegal
- Region: Ziguinchor
- Department: Bignona
- Arrondissement: Tenghory
- Commune: Ouonk

Population (2015)
  - Total: 855
- Time zone: UTC+0 (GMT)

Boulendor or Boulandor is a settlement in Bignona Department in Ziguinchor Region in Senegal. In 2015 its population was assessed at 855.
