= Affiniam =

- Location in Senegal
- Coordinates: 12°39′16″N 16°21′46″W
- Country: Senegal
- Region: Ziguinchor
- Department: Bignona
- Arrondissement: Tendouck

Population
  - Total: 1,620

Affiniam is a small town in the Bignona Department in the Ziguinchor Region of south-western Senegal. In 2002 it had a population of 1620 people. The town lies on the northern bank of the Casamance River, with the chief town of the Casamance region, Ziguinchor, located a few kilometers southeast across the river. The area is dominated by rice farming.

A dam was built in 1988 in collaboration with China on the mangrove to Bignona to desalinate and irrigate the rice fields. The project did not really succeed due to lack of management and technical resources.

Affiniam contains what has been described as "a splendid impluvium - a large, round mud house with a funnel-shaped roof" which was a place of refuge during wartime.
