= Bougoutoub =

Bougoutoub may refer to several places in the Ziguinchor Region of Senegal:

- Bougoutoub Bani
- Bougoutoub Djinoubor
