= Baïpeung =

- Location in Senegal
- Coordinates: 13°07′45″N 16°15′46″W
- Country: Senegal
- Region: Ziguinchor
- Department: Bignona
- Arrondissement: Sindian
- Rural community: Djibidione

Population (2010)
  - Total: 293
- Time zone: UTC+0 (GMT)

Baïpeung is a settlement in Senegal. In 2010 the population was assessed as 293.
