= Bacioucoto-Conboly =

- Village
- Location in Senegal
- Coordinates: 13°7′N 16°17′W
- Country: Senegal
- Region: Ziguinchor
- Department: Bignona
- Arrondissement: Sindian
- Rural community: Djibidione

Population (2002)
  - Total: 59
- Time zone: UTC+0 (GMT)

Bacioucoto-Conboly is a village in Senegal, located in the Bignona Department of the Ziguinchor Region in the Basse Casamance area of south-west Senegal. At the census if 2002 its population was 59 inhabitants in 8 households.
