= Bassène Kansana =

- Location in Senegal
- Coordinates: 13°8′39″N 16°5′13″W
- Country: Senegal
- Region: Ziguinchor
- Department: Bignona
- Arrondissement: Sindian
- Time zone: UTC+0 (GMT)

Bassène Kansana is a settlement in Senegal. At the 2002 census the population was 40 inhabitants in 6 households.
