= Balankine =

Balankine may refer to several places in the Ziguinchor Region of Senegal:

- Balankine Nord (rural commune of Oulampane)
- Balankine Sud (rural commune of Ouonck)
