= Kabadio =

Coordinates: 13°02′N 16°43′W

- Village
- Interactive map of Kabadio
- Country: Senegal
- Region: Ziguinchor
- Department: Bignona
- Arrondissement: Kataba
- Commune: Kataba I

Population (2002)
  - Total: 1,501
- Time zone: UTC+0 (GMT)

Kabadio is a village in the rural commune of Kataba I, in the Bignona Department of the Ziguinchor Region of southwestern Senegal. In 2002 it had a population of 1,501 people. The people of kabadio are known for their spirituality and many of them belong to the Mouride brotherhood which is Muslim community.
