= Bougoutoub Bani =

- Village
- Country: Senegal
- Region: Ziguinchor
- Department: Bignona
- Arrondissement: Sindian
- Commune: Oulampane

Population (2002)
  - Total: 371
- Time zone: UTC+0 (GMT)

Bougoutoub Bani is a village in the rural commune of Oulampane, in the Bignona Department of the Ziguinchor Region of Senegal. In 2002 it had a population of 371 people.
