= Bindago =

- Location in Senegal
- Coordinates: 12°50′N 16°14′W
- Country: Senegal
- Region: Ziguinchor
- Department: Bignona Department
- Arrondissement: Tenghory
- Commune: Tenghory

Population (2002)
  - Total: 152
- Time zone: UTC+0 (GMT)

Bindago is a settlement in the Bignona Department in Ziguinchor Region in Senegal. It had a population of 152 in 2002.
