= Balenkine-Sud =

- Location in Senegal
- Coordinates: 12°53′21″N 15°59′10″W
- Country: Senegal
- Region: Ziguinchor
- Department: Bignona
- Arrondissement: Tenghory
- Commune: Ouonk

Population (2015)
  - Total: 315
- Time zone: UTC+0 (GMT)

Balenkine-Sud is a settlement in the Bignona Department of the Ziguinchor Region in Senegal. In 2015 its population was estimated at 315.
