= Bassire =

- Location in Senegal
- Coordinates: 12°51′38″N 16°26′19″W
- Country: Senegal
- Region: Ziguinchor
- Department: Bignona
- Arrondissement: Tendouck
- Rural community: Kartiack

Population (2002)
  - Total: 891
- Time zone: UTC+0 (GMT)

Bassire is a settlement in the Bignona Department of Ziguinchor Region in the Basse Casamance area of south-west Senegal. At the 2002 census it had a population of 891.
