= Baghagha (Niamone) =

- Location in Senegal
- Coordinates: 12°41′13″N 16°17′45″W
- Country: Senegal
- Region: Ziguinchor
- Department: Bignona
- Arrondissement: Tenghory
- Rural Community: Niamone

Population (2002)
  - Total: 770
- Time zone: UTC+0 (GMT)

Baghagha is a village in Bignona Department in the Ziguinchor Region in the area of Basse Casamance in the south-west of Senegal.

In the 2002 census 770 inhabitants in 305 households were recorded.
