= Babatte =

- Village
- Location in Senegal
- Coordinates: 12°42′02″N 16°03′31″W
- Country: Senegal
- Region: Ziguinchor
- Department: Bignona
- Arrondissement: Tenghory
- Commune: Ouonk

Population (2002)
  - Total: 348
- Time zone: UTC+0 (GMT)

Babatte is a village in the Bignona Department of the Ziguinchor Region of Senegal. It has a population of 348 people according to the 2002 census.
