= Badiouré =

- Location in Senegal
- Coordinates: 12°53′N 16°08′W
- Country: Senegal
- Region: Ziguinchor
- Department: Bignona
- Arrondissement: Tenghory
- Commune: Tenghory

Population (2002)
  - Total: 3,518
- Time zone: UTC+0 (GMT)

Badiouré is a settlement the Bignona Department of the Ziguinchor Region in Senegal. The population was 3518 as of 2002.
