= Aïnoumane =

- Village
- Location in Senegal
- Coordinates: 13°3′55″N 16°34′59″W
- Country: Senegal
- Region: Ziguinchor
- Department: Bignona
- Commune: Diouloulou

Population (2002)
  - Total: 98
- Time zone: UTC+0 (GMT)

Aïnoumane is a village which is part of the urban commune of Diouloulou in the Bignona Department of the Ziguinchor Region of south-western Senegal. In 2002 it had a population of 98 people.
