= Bakighaye =

- Location in Senegal
- Coordinates: 13°8′48″N 16°7′54″W
- Country: Senegal
- Region: Ziguinchor
- Department: Bignona
- Arrondissement: Sindian
- Rural community: Djibidione

Population (2002)
  - Total: 142
- Time zone: UTC+0 (GMT)

Bakighaye is a settlement in Senegal. In 2002 the population was 142 in 20 households.
