= Bouhinor =

- Location in Senegal
- Coordinates: 12°52′N 16°03′W
- Country: Senegal
- Region: Ziguinchor
- Department: Bignona
- Arrondissement: Tenghory
- Commune: Ouonk

Population (2015)
  - Total: 277
- Time zone: UTC+0 (GMT)

Bouhinor is a settlement in the department of Bignona in Ziguinchor Region in Senegal. In 2015 its population was estimated at 277.
