= Baïpeulh-Frontière =

- Country: Senegal
- Region: Ziguinchor
- Department: Bignona
- Arrondissement: Sindian
- Rural community: Djibidione
- Time zone: UTC+0 (GMT)

Baïpeulh-Frontière is a settlement in Senegal.
