= Badionkoto =

- Village
- Location in Senegal
- Coordinates: 13.064056°N 16.579472°W
- Country: Senegal
- Region: Ziguinchor
- Department: Bignona

Population (2002)
  - Total: 150
- Time zone: UTC+0 (GMT)

Badionkoto is a village in the Bignona Department of the Ziguinchor Region of southwestern Senegal. In 2002 it had a population of 150 people.
