= Tenghori Arrondissement =

- Arrondissement
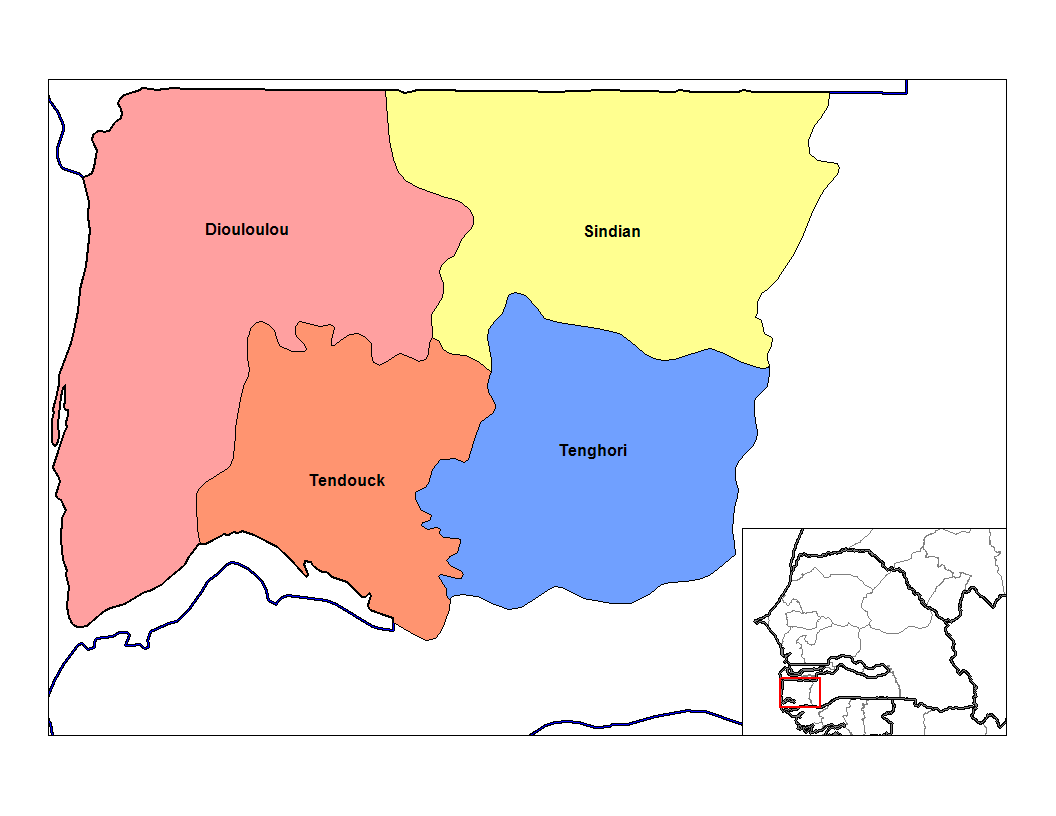
- Location in the Bignona Department
- Country: Senegal
- Region: Ziguinchor Region
- Department: Bignona Department

Area
  - Total: 1,073 km^{2} (414 sq mi)

Population (2013 census)
  - Total: 60,734
  - Density: 56.60/km^{2} (146.6/sq mi)
- Time zone: UTC±00:00 (GMT)

Tenghori Arrondissement is an arrondissement of the Bignona Department in the Ziguinchor Region of Senegal.

== Subdivisions ==
The arrondissement is divided administratively into 4 rural communities (communautés rurales) and in turn into villages.

Communautés rurales :

Coubalan CR	Niamone CR	Ouonck CR	Tenghory CR
13 villages : Boulindieng; Boureck; Boutolatte; Carrefour Djilacoune ?; Coubalan; Coubanao; Diemecounda ?; Dioubour; Djiguinoume; Djilacoune; Djining ?; Fangoumé ?; Fintiock; Hatioune; Kafaye ?; Karamba; Mandouar I; Medina Yacine Ba ?; Niandane; Tapilane	10 villages : Baghagha; Colomba N; Diagobel; Diandialate; Diengue; Gérina; Kandiou; Niamone; Tabi; Tobor	24 villages : Babatte; Balenkine-Sud; Bouhinor; Boulendor; Bouyal; Congoly; Diagno; Diagour; Djikoutang; Djinoubor O; Djiringoumane; Ghamoune; Kigninding; Mandouard II; Ndiagne; Ndiéba; Oufoulo; Ouonck; Santack; Sindialong; Souda; Togho	34 villages : Badiouré; Bani; Bindago; Boutolate; Diakine; Diarone; Diourou; Djilonding; Djimakakor; Djiticoubong; Djiwa; Edjilaye; Falméré; Francounda; Ghoniame; Kafesse; Kassila; Khaoudiou; Koutenghor; Mangoulène centre; Mangoulène Dioga; Mangoulène Nialor; Mangoulène Oubème; Niassarang; Ousseuk; Petit Koulaye; Piran; Sandougou; Soutou; Takème; Tao; Tendième; Tendimane; Tenghory; Tenghory Transgambienne; Thiangouth
