= Balankine Nord =

- Village
- Location in Senegal
- Coordinates: 12°53′26″N 15°29′20″W
- Country: Senegal
- Region: Ziguinchor
- Department: Bignona
- Arrondissement: Sindian
- Commune: Oulampane

Population (2002)
  - Total: 631
- Time zone: UTC+0 (GMT)

Balankine Nord is a village in the rural commune of Oulampane, in the Bignona Department of the Ziguinchor Region of Senegal. In 2002 it had a population of 631 people.
