= Bougoutoub Djinoubor =

- Village
- Location in Senegal
- Coordinates: 12.9018°N 16.1010°W
- Country: Senegal
- Region: Ziguinchor
- Department: Bignona
- Arrondissement: Sindian
- Commune: Oulampane

Population (2002)
  - Total: 267
- Time zone: UTC+0 (GMT)

Bougoutoub Djinoubor is a village in the rural commune of Oulampane, in the Bignona Department of the Ziguinchor Region of Senegal. In 2002 it had a population of 267 people.
