= Zois =

Zois is a surname and masculine given name which may refer to:

- Antonios Zois (1869–1941), Greek chieftain
- Chris Zois, American psychiatrist and author
- Christos Zois (born 1968), Greek politician
- Karl von Zois (1756–1799), Carniolan amateur botanist and plant collector
- Peter Zoïs (born 1978), Australian soccer manager and retired player
- Sigmund Zois (1747–1819), Carniolan nobleman, natural scientist and patron of the arts
- Zois Ballas (born 1987), Greek basketball player
- Zois Karampelas (born 2001), Greek basketball player
- Zois Panagiotopoulos, birth name of Joe Panos (born 1971), American former National Football League player
- Zois (mythology), a martyr in wendish mythology

== See also ==
- Zois Mansion, Ljubljana, Slovenia
- Zois Lodge at Kokra Saddle, Slovenia, a mountain hostel
