= Tendouck Arrondissement =

- Arrondissement
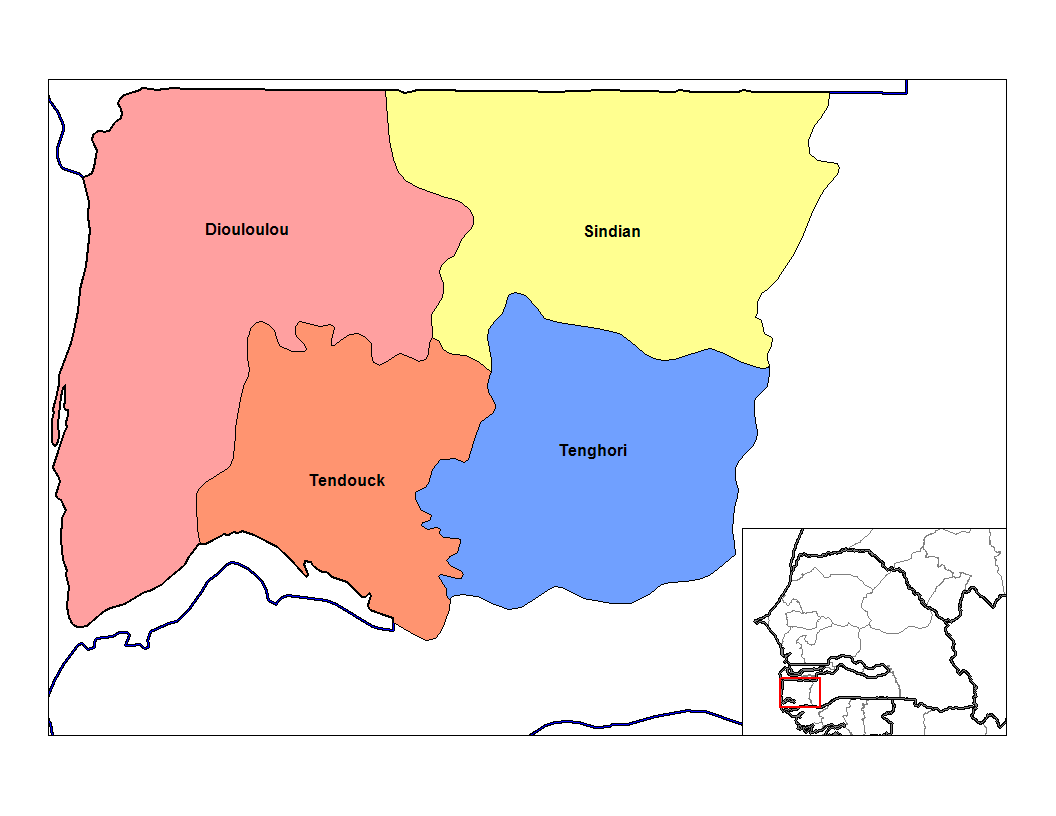
- Location in the Bignona Department
- Country: Senegal
- Region: Ziguinchor Region
- Department: Bignona Department

Area
  - Total: 902 km^{2} (348 sq mi)

Population (2013 census)
  - Total: 32,487
  - Density: 36.0/km^{2} (93.3/sq mi)
- Time zone: UTC±00:00 (GMT)

Tendouck Arrondissement is an arrondissement of the Bignona Department in the Ziguinchor Region of Senegal.

== Subdivisions ==
The arrondissement is divided administratively into 5 rural communities and in turn into villages.

Communautés rurales :

| Balinghor CR | Diégoune CR | Kartiack CR | Mangagoulack CR | Mlomp CR |
|---|---|---|---|---|
| 3 villages : Bagaya; Balinghor; Mandégane | 3 villages : Diégoune; Djimande; Kagnobon | 4 villages : Bassire; Dianki; Kartiack; Thiobon | 8 villages : Affiniam; Bodé; Boutem; Bouthégol; Diatock; Djilapaô; Elana; Mangagoulack; Tendouck | 2 villages : Mlomp (Bignona); Edjamat |
