= Elole =

Place in Ziguinchor, Senegal

Coordinates: 13°07′N 16°21′W

- Interactive map of Elole
- Région: Ziguinchor
- Département: Bignona, Sindian Arrondissement, Djibidione CR
- Elevation: 2 m (6.6 ft)

Population (2002)
  - Total: 159

Elole or Elol is a village in the rural community of Djibidione CR, located in the Sindian Arrondissement and Bignona Department, a subdivision of the Ziguinchor Region in the historic region of Casamance in the south of the country of Senegal.

According to the 2023 Senegal census, Elol had a population of 55.
