= Mariama Sonko =

Senegalese farmer and organizer

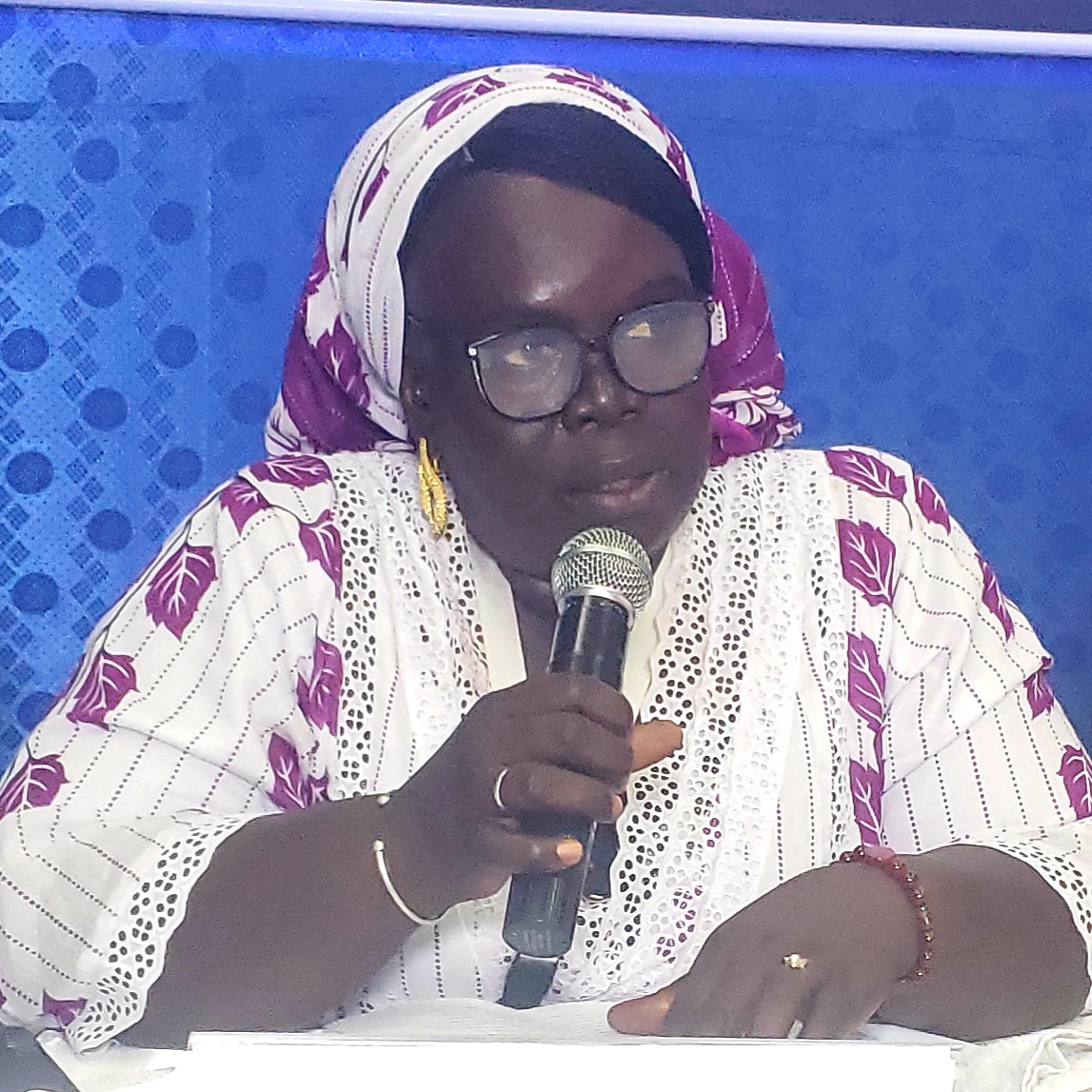
- Pronunciation
- Born: Bandjikaky
- Organization: We Are The Solution
- Children: 5
- Website: https://wasafrica.org

Mariama Sonko is a Senegalese activist and ecofeminist who advocates for food sovereignty in West Africa. She is the president of We Are The Solution ("Nous Sommes la Solution", abbreviated as NSS), an organization fighting for women's empowerment in agriculture and agroecology.

== Childhood ==
Sonko was born in Bandjikaky, Senegal in the early 1970s to a family of farmers. As a child, she moved between Bandjikaky and her parent's hometown of Karongue. She was circumcised at the age of 10. Her father died when she was 12, leaving her mother to take care of several young children. Her mother struggled to take care of the family, in part because wives were traditionally forbidden from inheriting the land of their husbands.

Shortly before graduating high school she was forced by her family to marry, drop out of school, and move to her husband's town of Niaguis. Though she attempted to continue her studies, she was unable to deal with academic work on top of her domestic duties.

== Activism ==
Sonko began organizing other women when her husband was away to encourage mutual support and reduce dependence on their husbands. This included providing paid manure transport, fabric dyeing, and fruit/vegetable packing services to farmers.

Sonko's husband died in 1997 or 1998 in Yarang due to the Casamance conflict. Sonko returned to her husband's parents in Niaguis and became a farmer on his land.

Sonko continued to work with local women's peasant groups; in 1999, she was elected District President of the Niaguis Women's Promotion Group, and in 2001 she was appointed Treasurer General of the Association of Young Farmers of Casamance (AJAC Lukaal). Several years later she, alongside several other women, rented a plot of land for agriculture in exchange for giving a portion of the harvest to the landowner; however, as the first harvest came in, the landowner kicked them out. When Sonko began campaigning to change the landowner's mind, she was excluded from community events.

=== We Are The Solution ===
We Are The Solution was co-founded by Sonko in 2011. It started as a campaign by twelve rural women's organizations in 5 countries (Senegal, Burkina Faso, Guinea, Mali, and Ghana); it was later turned into a non-governmental organization. The campaign was created to counter the Alliance for a Green Revolution in Africa, which focused on artificial fertilizers and genetically modified seeds as opposed to traditional ways of farming. In 2014 NSS became a rural women's movement.

The primary goals of NSS are promoting ancestral knowledge and practices supporting African food sovereignty, getting decision-makers to take agroecological practices into account in national agricultural policy, and supporting products from family farming or agroecological practices. As of 2024, it had at least 185,000 members and 800 affiliated rural women's member organizations across 8 countries (the original 5 alongside Ivory Coast, The Gambia, and Guinea-Bissau).

We Are The Solution has held workshops, forums, and radio broadcasts to disseminate traditional agricultural practices. They also established new agroecological farms, three plant nurseries (in Burkina Faso, Guinea, and Senegal), and several seed huts to maintain local farmers' "seed capital". Sonko also runs an agricultural training center employing over 20 people.

Through NSS, Sonko has been involved in numerous projects creating natural alternatives to agricultural products, including a bio-fertilizer made from cow manure, an alternative to bouillon cubes made from herbs called "Sum Pack", and bio-pesticides made from ginger, chili, and garlic. NSS also successfully campaigned for the Senegalese government to subsidize bio-fertilizer use.

NSS has campaigned for the right for women to own land, which despite being allowed by law is often culturally forbidden.

== Personal life ==
Sonko was formerly married to Abdul, who was a teacher until he died in the late 1990s. She has five children: four girls and one boy. She is of the Jola people.
