= Ouonck =

- Village
- Interactive map of Ouonck
- Coordinates: 12°42′36″N 16°03′20″W
- Country: Senegal
- Région: Ziguinchor
- Département: Bignona

Area
  - Total: 268.1 km^{2} (103.5 sq mi)
- Elevation: 1 m (3.3 ft)

Population (2023 Census)
  - Total: 10,914
  - Density: 40.7/km^{2} (105/sq mi)
- Time zone: UTC±00:00 (GMT)

Ouonck is a Municipality in Senegal located in Ziguinchor region. It consists of 24 villages.

== Twin towns – sister cities ==
Ouonck is twinned with:

- Fleury-sur-Orne, Calvados, France. Since 1992
- Bretteville-sur-Odon, Calvados, France. Since 1997
