= Guédiawaye (arrondissement) =

- Arrondissement
- Location within Senegal
- Country: Senegal

Guédiawaye is an arrondissement of Guédiawaye in Dakar Region in Senegal.
