= Guédiawaye department =

Department in Senegal

Coordinates: 14°46′34″N 17°23′44″W

Guédiawaye
- Department
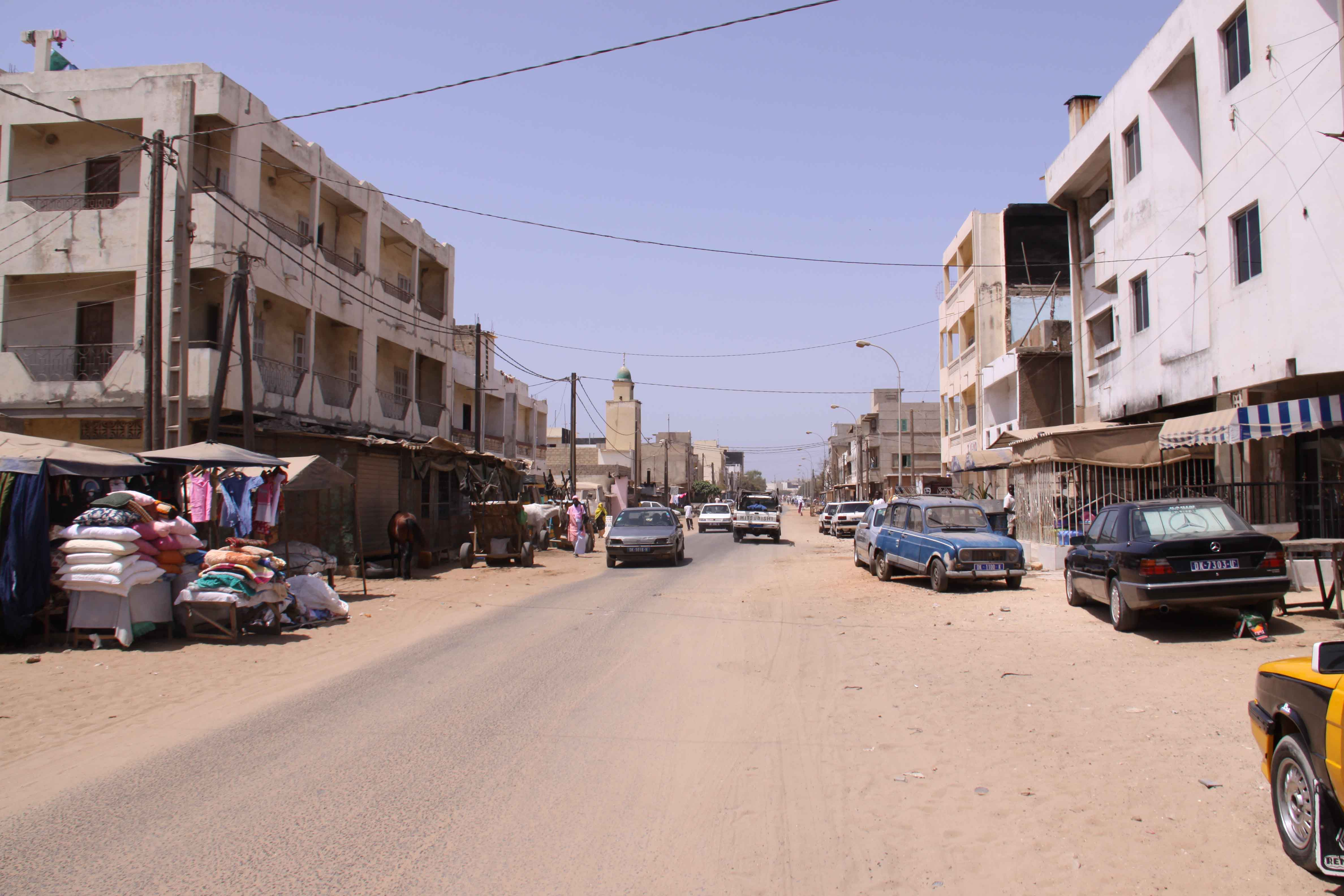
- Guédiawaye

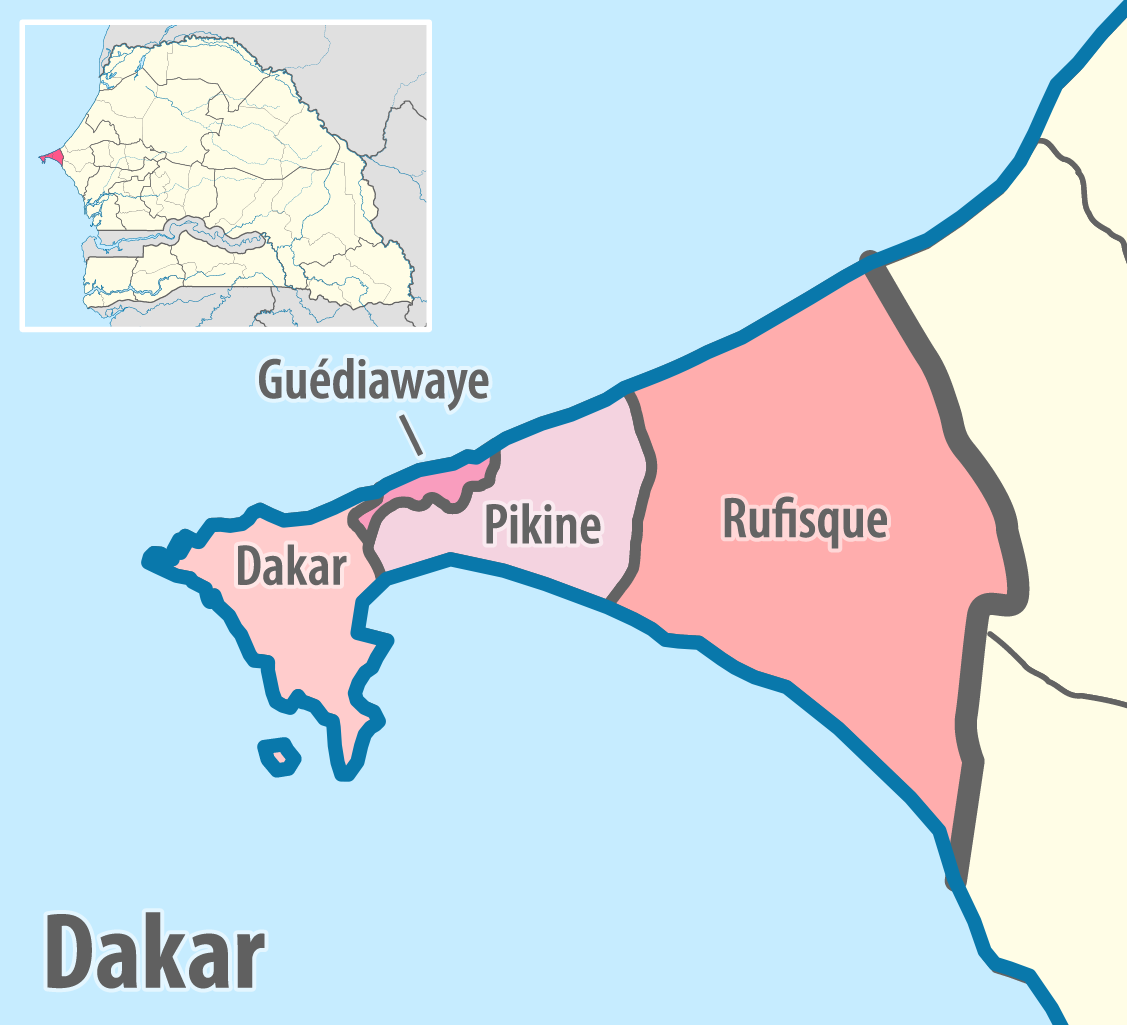
- Location in the Dakar Region
- Country: Senegal
- Region: Dakar region
- Department: Guédiawaye

Area
  - Total: 13 km^{2} (5.0 sq mi)

Population (2013 census)
  - Total: 329,659
  - Density: 25,000/km^{2} (66,000/sq mi)
- Time zone: UTC+0 (GMT)

Guédiawaye department is one of the 46 departments of Senegal and one of the four making up Dakar region on the Cap-Vert peninsula.

== Subdivisions ==
It comprises a single arrondissement, Guédiawaye Arrondissement, which is subdivided into five communes d'arrondissement:

- Ndiarème-Limamoulaye
- Golf
- Sam-Notaire
- Wakhinane-Nimzatt
- Médina-Gounass

== Population ==
In the census of December 2002 the population of the department was recorded as 258,370. In 2005, it was estimated at 286,989.
