= Bodé =

Coordinates: 12°39′12″N 16°25′30″W

- Interactive map of Bodé
- Country: Senegal
- Time zone: UTC+0 (GMT)

Bodé is a settlement in Senegal located in the Tendouck Arrondissement. At the 2023 census, the village had 249 inhabitants and 37 households.
