= Ballas (disambiguation) =

Ballas is a variety of non-gem-grade diamond.

Ballas may also refer to:

== People ==
- Corky Ballas (born 1960), American ballroom dancer
- George Ballas (1925–2011), American entrepreneur
- Shimon Ballas (1930–2019), Iraqi-Israeli writer
- Gustavo Ballas (born 1958), Argentine boxer
- Mark Ballas (born 1986), American dancer
- Panagiotis Ballas (born 1993), Greek football player
- Shirley Ballas (born 1960), British ballroom dancer
- Zois Ballas (born 1987), Greek basketball player

== Other uses ==
- Ballas Transit Center, a bus transit terminal in Missouri, US
- The Ballas, a fictional street gang in the video games Grand Theft Auto: San Andreas (2004) and Grand Theft Auto V (2013)
- Ballas, an antagonistic member of the Orokin race in the video game Warframe

== See also ==
- Ballers
