= Vivienne Balla =

Hungarian photographer (born 1986)

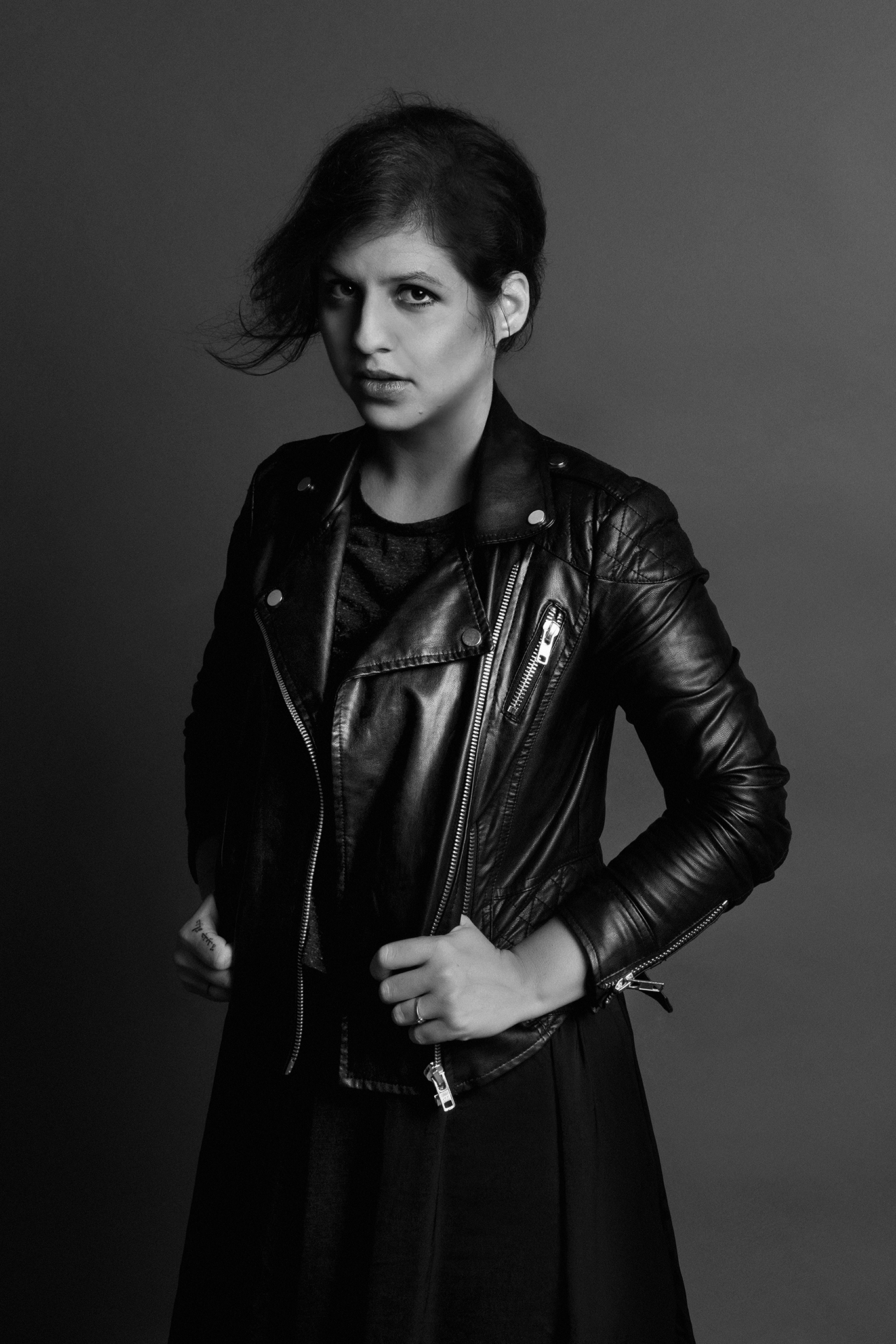
- Born: 24 June 1986 (age 40); Tatabánya, Hungary
- Occupations: Photographer, businesswoman
- Awards: Fashion Awards Hungary – Fashion Photographer of the Year (2012)
- Website: www.vivienneballa.com

Vivienne Balla (born 24 June 1986) is a Hungarian fine art and fashion photographer. She holds a master's degree in photography. She graduated from Moholy-Nagy University of Art and Design in 2010. Her photos have been published in magazines and have received a number of accolades. Balla's specialty is fashion, beauty, advertising and portrait photography. In 2014 she moved to Dubai to start her international career. In the same year she got represented in Tokyo, Milan and Munich.

== Schools ==
2006 - 2011 Visual & Environment Culture teacher (Moholy-Nagy University of Art and Design)
2005 - 2010 Visual Communications - Photography (Moholy-Nagy University of Art and Design)
2003 - 2004 Photography (Camera Anima Open Academy)
2000 - 2005 Tóparti High School of Art

== Awards and accolades ==
- 2012: Fashion Awards Hungary, Fashion Photographer of the Year
- 2014: Fashion Awards Hungary, Fashion Photographer of the Year (Nominated)

== Independent exhibitions ==
2012

- Dreams - (STUDIO V, Budapest Design Week)

2011

- Vivienne's Diary - (FISE Gallery, Budapest)
- Dash of Color (Tripont Gallery, Budapest)
- Marion, (Millenáris Park, Budapest)
- Fashion Moments, (Lánchíd 19 Design Hotel, Budapest)

== Group exhibitions ==
2012

- FISE 30, (Museum of Applied Arts, Budapest)
- Human Dignity, (Ludwig Museum, Budapest)

2011

- Photogenes (Spiritusz Gallery, Budapest)
- Mozgásban (Spiritusz Gallery, Budapest)

2010

- Budapest Art Fair (Kunsthalle, Budapest)
- Art Moments (Hybrid Office Gallery, Budapest)
- MOME Foto 2010 (Eötvös 10 Gallery, Budapest)
- Generation Rules (Hybrid Art & Cafe)
- MOME Diploma 2010 (Ponton Gallery, Budapest)
- Contrasts (FISE Gallery, Budapest)

2009

- Green MOME (Ponton Gallery, Budapest)
- Entrópia (Instant Art Bar Garden, Budapest)
- MOME Maraton (Millenaris Park)
- Ami személyes és ami... (Óbudai Társaskör Gallery, Budapest)

2008

- MOME BESTiárium (Ponton Gallery, Budapest)
- First Sight (Szent István Museum, Budapest)
