= Batinding-boudiakère =

Coordinates: 13.1158°N 16.1596°W

- Interactive map of Batinding-boudiakère
- Country: Senegal
- Time zone: UTC+0 (GMT)

Batinding-boudiakère is a settlement in Senegal.
