= Bassène Mandouer =

Coordinates: 13°08′N 16°05′W

- Interactive map of Bassène Mandouer
- Country: Senegal
- Time zone: UTC+0 (GMT)

Bassène Mandouer is a settlement in Senegal.
