= Bassane =

Coordinates: 13.0833°N 16.3579°W

- Interactive map of Bassane
- Country: Senegal
- Time zone: UTC+0 (GMT)

Bassane is a settlement in Senegal.
