= Boulighoye =

Coordinates: 13.0250°N 16.2420°W

- Interactive map of Boulighoye
- Country: Senegal
- Time zone: UTC+0 (GMT)

Boulighoye is a settlement in Senegal.
