= Diouloulou =

- Town and commune
- Location in Senegal
- Coordinates: 13°3′N 16°36′W
- Country: Senegal
- Region: Ziguinchor
- Department: Bignona

Area
  - Town and commune: 4.769 km^{2} (1.841 sq mi)

Population (2023 census)
  - Town and commune: 8,109
  - Density: 1,700/km^{2} (4,404/sq mi)
- Time zone: UTC+0 (GMT)

Diouloulou is a small town and commune in the Bignona Department of the Ziguinchor Region of southwestern Senegal. In 2002, the town had a population of 2,725.

The village of Diouloulou was the capital of the rural community of Diouloulou and of the arrondissement of Diouloulou. In 2008, the town gained the status of a "commune". This was connected with the separation of the urban area from the territory of the rural community and from the arrondissement, whose main place and namesake henceforth was the village of Kataba I. The urban area includes the villages of Djibaly, Badionkoto, Missira, Brikamanding 2, Aïnoumane and Santhiba.

Diouloulou, a quiet, unremarkable town, lies along the N5 road. There is a small church, Eglise de Diouloulou, in the southern outskirts of the town, and a campement at Auberge Myriam.

Senegal national football team forward Lamine Camara is a native of Diouloulou.

== History ==
In April 2002, an MFDC splinter group, the North Front, led by Kamouguc Diatta, carried out an attack on the town, a month after assaulting Kafountine. On December 20, 2005, armed gunmen assassinated Cherif Samsidine Nema Aidara, a government ambassador to the Casamance peace process, at his home in the town.
