= Baligname =

Balignane
- Interactive map of Balignane
- Coordinates: 12°54′00″N 16°17′00″W
- Country: Senegal

Population (2002)
  - Total: 310
- Time zone: UTC+0 (GMT)

Balignane is a settlement in Senegal. It is located in Senegal's southernmost region, Casamance.
