= Boulélaye =

Coordinates: 13.1197°N 16.2836°W

- Interactive map of Boulélaye
- Country: Senegal
- Time zone: UTC+0 (GMT)

Boulélaye is a settlement in Senegal.
