= Zois (mythology) =

Mythological martyr

Zois is a martyr in wendish mythology, probably a reference to the obotrite king Stois or Stoigar, who was beheaded by the emperor Otto the Great.
