= Coubalan =

- Village
- Coubalan in Senegal
- Coordinates: 12°39′N 16°10′W
- Country: Senegal
- Region: Ziguinchor
- Department: Bignona
- Arrondissement: Tenghory Arrondissement

Coubalan is a small town in the rural district of the same name, located in Tenghory Arrondissement, Bignona Department, Ziguinchor Region, Senegal.
