= Boulayotte =

Coordinates: 13°04′N 16°09′W

- Interactive map of Boulayotte
- Country: Senegal
- Time zone: UTC+0 (GMT)

Boulayotte is a settlement in Senegal.
