= Vital Balla =

Congolese politician

Vital Balla (December 13, 1936 – August 24, 2025) was a Congolese politician. He is the co-founder of the Congolese Association for Friendship Among Peoples (ACAP).

Balla was born in Madingou, Bouenza on December 13th, 1936. He entered public service in 1956 and was the co-establisher of the Congolese Association for Friendship Among Peoples (ACAP) in 1965. He became the ambassador extraordinary and plenipotentiary to Cuba in 1976. Later, in Brazzaville, Balla served as deputy to the People's National Assembly in 1989 as well as a member of the Higher Council of the Republic in 1991. Balla also became a presidential envoy in 2011.

== Career ==
In 1972 he was included as a member of the Central Committee of the Congolese Party of Labour (PCT), and he remained a member of that body until 1991.

As of 2000, Balla was the second vice-president of the committee appointed to oversee the ceasefire in Brazzaville.

Balla is the president of the Congolese Association for Friendship with the Peoples (ACAP), a position he has held since 1974. As of 1984, he served as vice president of the World Peace Council.

== Awards ==
In 2010 he was awarded the China-Africa Friendship Award, along with personalities such as Kenneth Kaunda of Zambia. In October 2011, Balla was awarded the Cuban Friendship Medal by ICAP.
