= Bouliwaye =

Coordinates: 13.0837°N 16.3407°W

- Interactive map of Bouliwaye
- Country: Senegal
- Time zone: UTC+0 (GMT)

Bouliwaye is a settlement in Senegal.
