= Thomas Balla =

American fencer

Personal information
- Born: January 25, 1936 (age 90) Budapest, Hungary

Sport
- Sport: Fencing

Thomas Balla (born January 25, 1936) is an American former fencer. He competed in the team sabre event at the 1968 Summer Olympics.
