= Batinding-Diémé =

Coordinates: 13°02′N 16°14′W

- Interactive map of Batinding-Diémé
- Country: Senegal
- Time zone: UTC+0 (GMT)

Batinding-Diémé is a settlement in Senegal.
