= Balla-Ougonor =

Coordinates: 13°06′N 16°10′W

- Interactive map of Balla-Ougonor
- Country: Senegal
- Time zone: UTC+0 (GMT)

Balla-Ougonor is a settlement in Senegal.
