= Balla-Djiring =

Coordinates: 13.0819°N 16.1960°W

- Interactive map of Balla-Djiring
- Country: Senegal
- Time zone: UTC+0 (GMT)

Balla-Djiring is a settlement in Senegal.
