= Balla-Bassène =

Coordinates: 13°04′N 16°12′W

- Interactive map of Balla-Bassène
- Country: Senegal
- Time zone: UTC+0 (GMT)

Balla-Bassène is a settlement in Senegal.
