= Zois Ballas =

Greek professional basketball player

Zois Ballas (Greek: Ζώης Μπάλλας; born 1987) is a Greek professional basketball player. He is 2.05 m (6 ft 8 3/4 in) in height and he plays at the power forward position.

== Professional career ==
Ballas played with AEK Athens, Doukas, and Doxa Lefkadas.
