= Balla-Djifalone =

Coordinates: 13.0728°N 16.1851°W

- Interactive map of Balla-Djifalone
- Country: Senegal
- Time zone: UTC+0 (GMT)

Balla-Djifalone is a settlement in Senegal.
