= Kataba Arrondissement =

Arrondissement in Senegal

Kataba arrondissement is an arrondissement in Senegal. It is one of the 4 arrondissements in the Bignona Department of Ziguinchor Region in the south-west of the country. Previously known as Diouloulou, it was renamed in 2008 when Diouloulou town became an urban commune. The chief settlement is Kataba I. The arrondissement is divided into three rural districts (communautés rurales); Kataba 1, Djinaky and Kafountine.

== Settlements ==
The population in 2002 is given in brackets:

Kataba I

- Bandjikaky (822)
- Bani Israël (74)
- Barakesse (385)
- Birkamanding (285)
- Bourome (711)
- Coubanack (711)
- Coulobory (285)
- Courame (698)
- Dar Salam-Chérif (937)
- Daroukairy (577)
- Diénoucounda (93)
- Dimbaya (213)
- Djibara (254)
- Djilacoumoune (230)
- Domboudir (1071)
- Kabadio (1501)
- Kataba I (303)
- Kataba II (520)
- Katack (758)
- Koba (115)
- Koudioubé (301)
- Koulandiang (213)
- Kounkoudiang (162)
- Macouda (744)
- Mahamouda Diola (612)
- Medina Birassou (223)
- Medina Daffé (1113)
- Missirah (133)
- Niafourang (165)
- Poukène (81)
- Samboulandiang (456)
- Santhiaba (344)
- Séléty (829)
- Suzana (193)
- Tambakounda (840)
- Tambouille (673)
- Touba (1003)
- Woniack (321)
