= Bignona department =

Coordinates: 12°49′48″N 16°14′24″W

Bignona
- Department
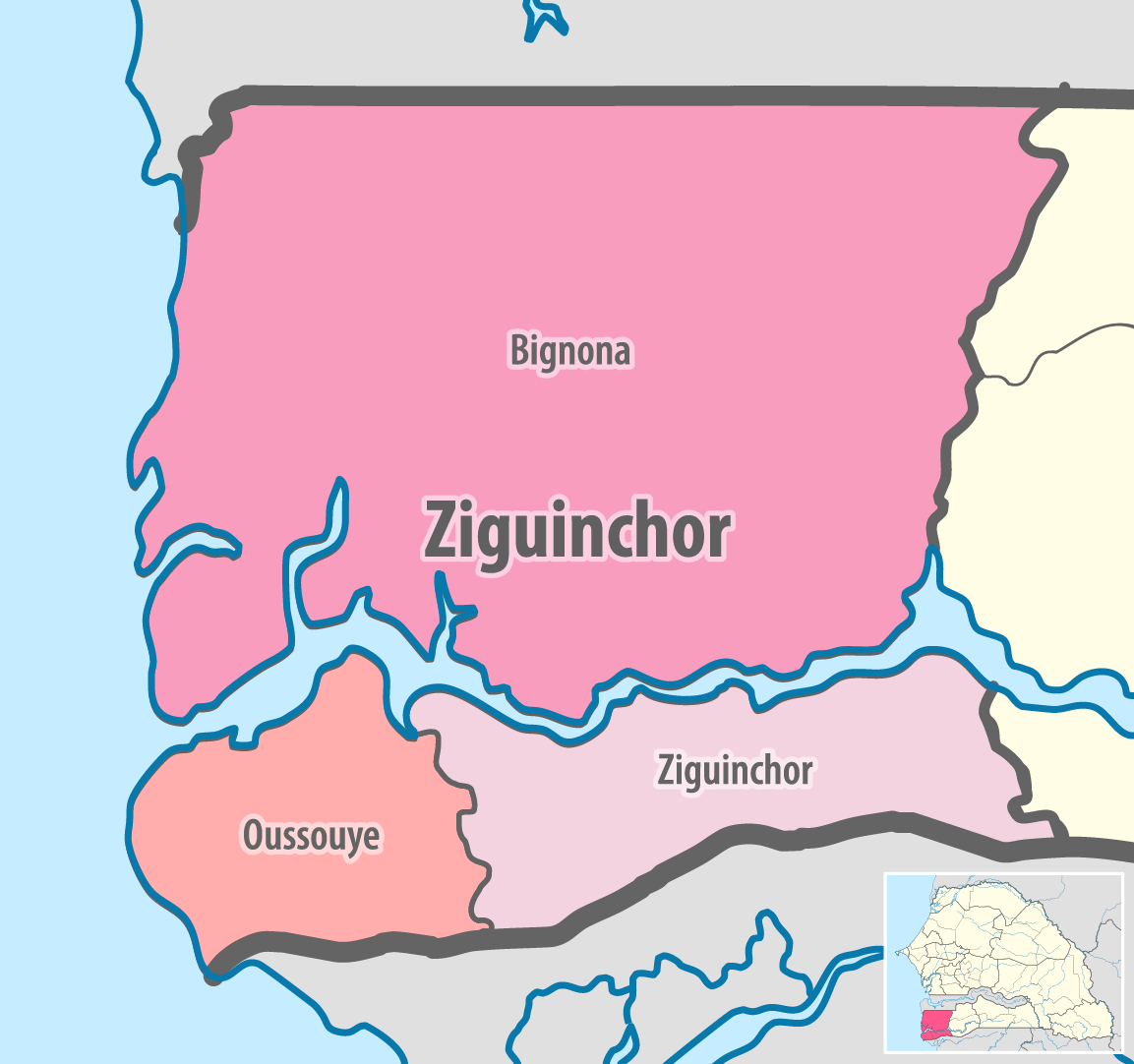
- Location in the Ziguinchor region
- Country: Senegal
- Region: Ziguinchor region
- Capital: Bignona

Area
  - Total: 5,295 km^{2} (2,044 sq mi)

Population (2023 census)
  - Total: 284,897
  - Density: 53.80/km^{2} (139.4/sq mi)
- Time zone: UTC+0 (GMT)

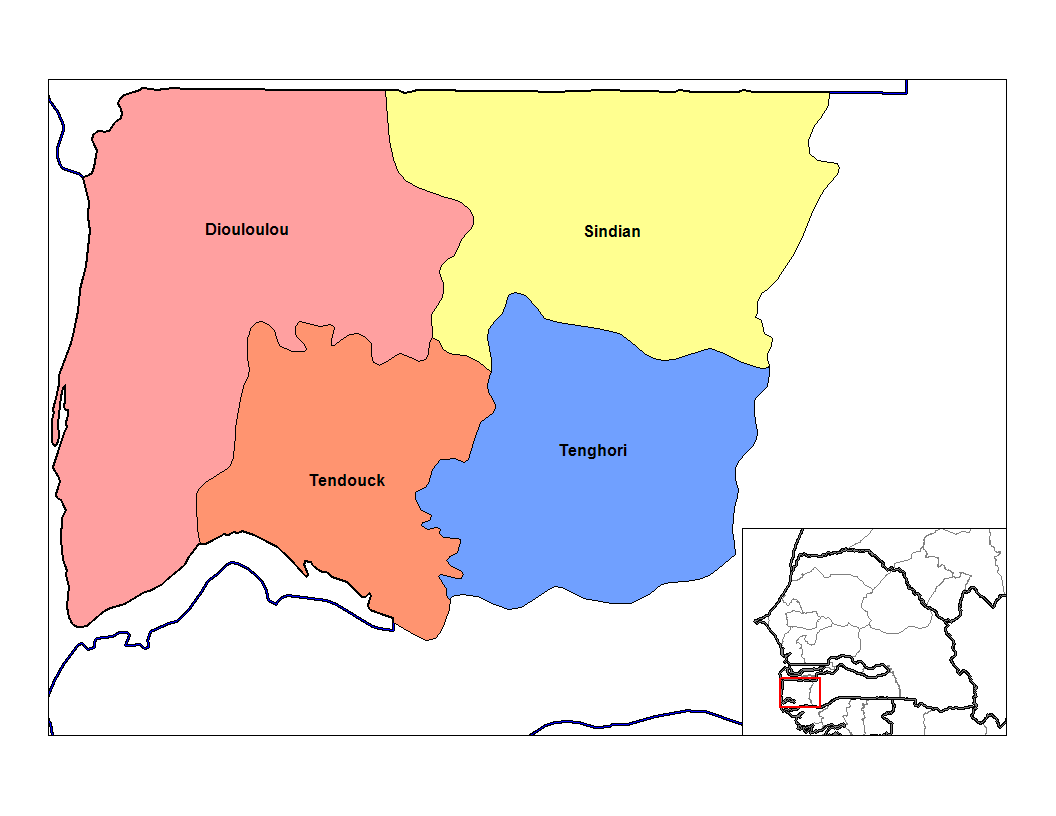
Bignona Department arrondissements

Bignona department (French: Département de Bignona) is one of the three departments in the Ziguinchor region of Senegal.

== Districts ==
Within the department are three urban communes: Bignona, Thionck Essyl and Diouloulou.

The rest of the department is divided administratively into four arrondissements made up of rural districts (communautés rurales):

- Kataba Arrondissement (renamed from Diouloulou in 2008, when Diouloulou became a commune)
  - Kataba
  - Djinaky
  - Kafoutine
- Sindian Arrondissement:
  - Djibidione
  - Oulampane
  - Sindian
  - Suelle
- Tendouck Arrondissement:
  - Balinghor
  - Diégoune
  - Kartiack
  - Mangagoulack
  - Mlomp
- Tenghory Arrondissement:
  - Coubalan
  - Niamone
  - Ouonck
  - Tenghory

== Historic sites ==
- Mausoleum of Ahoune Sané, Koundioughor, Sindian Arrondissement
- 100 year old Sindian Fromager (Kapok) tree, a place of worship for the rites of initiation
- Bakolon Badji site at Niankite, a place of worship for the rites of initiation
- Sweetwater wells at Kafountine, Arrondissement of Kataba
- Palm Baobab of Baligname
- Nankoray termite colony at Djilondine, place of worship for the animist priestesses
