= Departments of Senegal =

The 14 regions of Senegal are subdivided into 46 departments and 103 arrondissements (neither of which have administrative function) and by collectivités locales (the 14 régions, 110 communes, and 320 communautés rurales) which elect administrative officers.

Since three new regions increased the number of departments to 45 in 2008, the most recent addition, of Keur Massar, in May 2008 brings the number to 46.

Map of the departments and regions of Senegal

The departments are listed below, by region:

== Dakar region ==
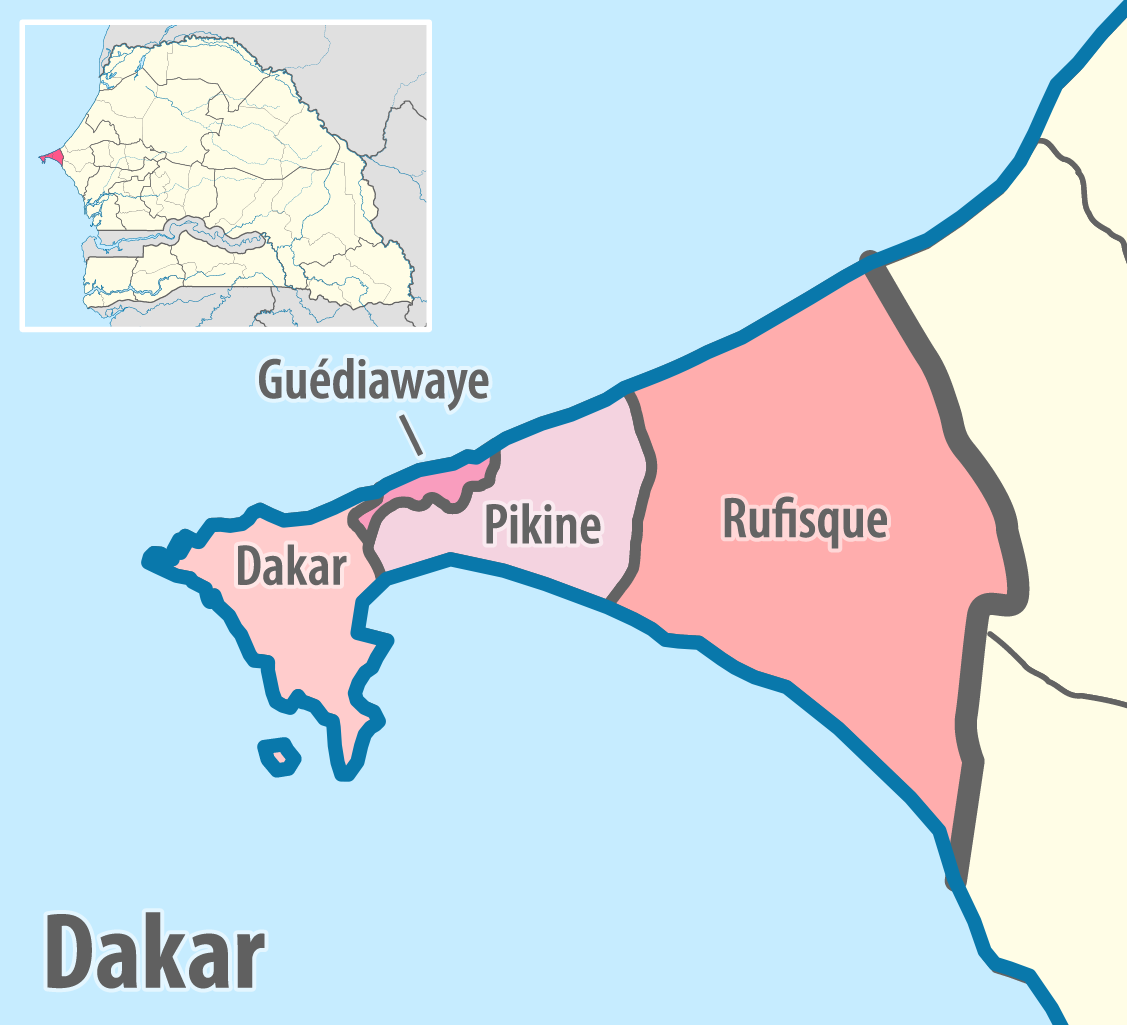
Departments of Dakar region

- Dakar department
- Guédiawaye department
- Keur Massar department (since May 2021)
- Pikine department
- Rufisque department

== Diourbel region ==
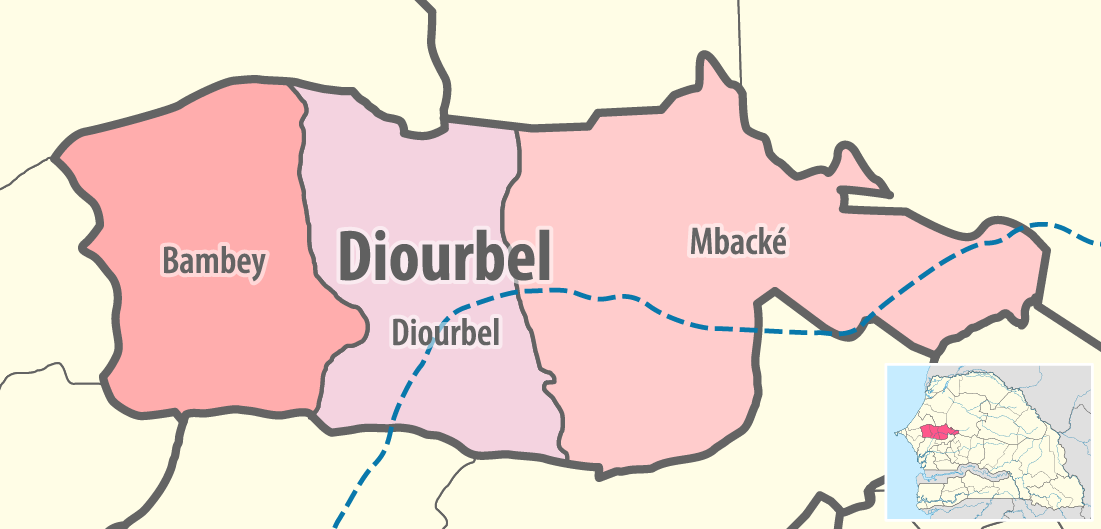
Departments of Diourbel region

- Bambey department
- Diourbel department
- Mbacké department

== Fatick region ==
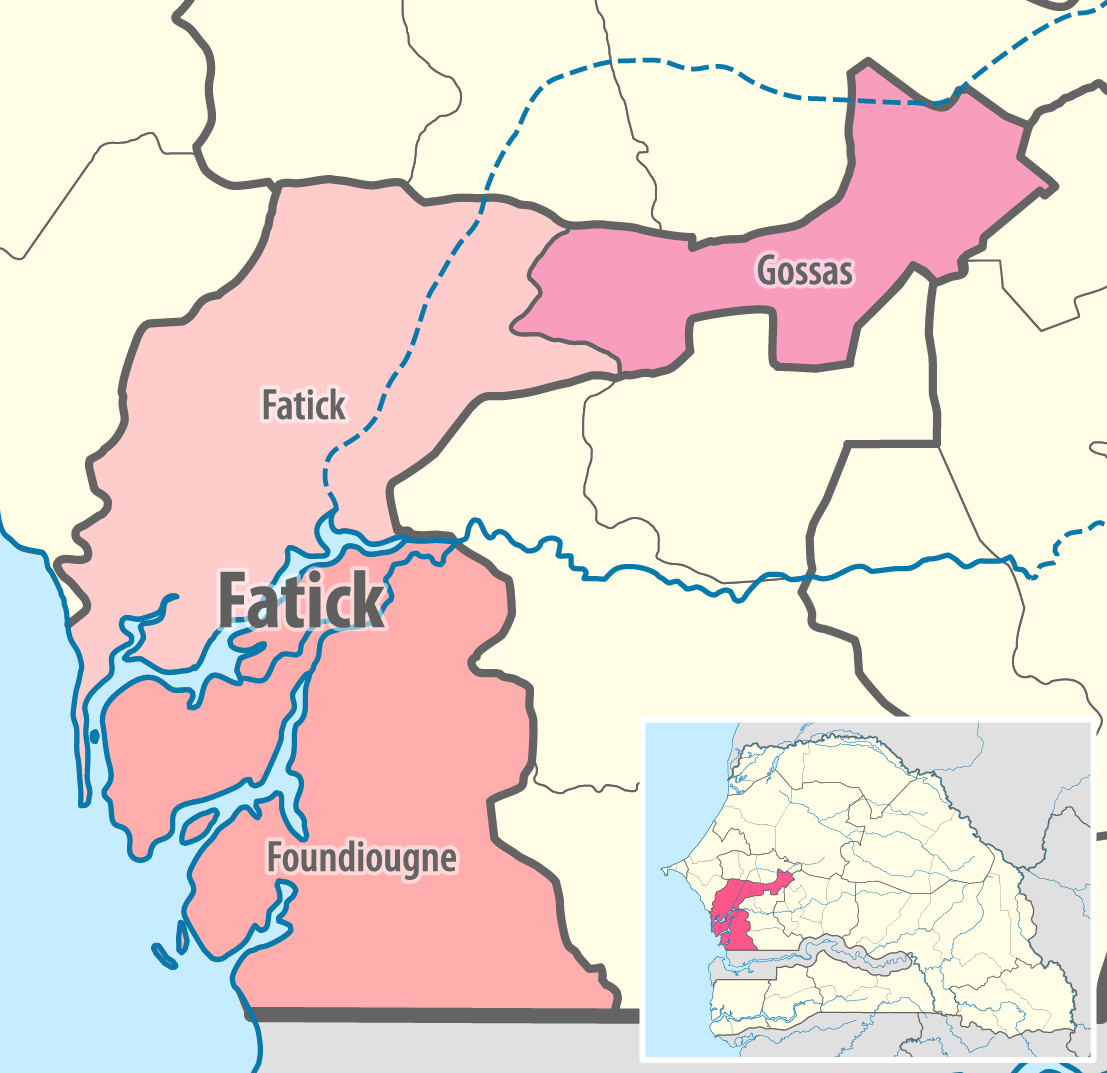
Departments of Fatick region

- Fatick department
- Foundiougne department
- Gossas department

== Kaffrine region ==
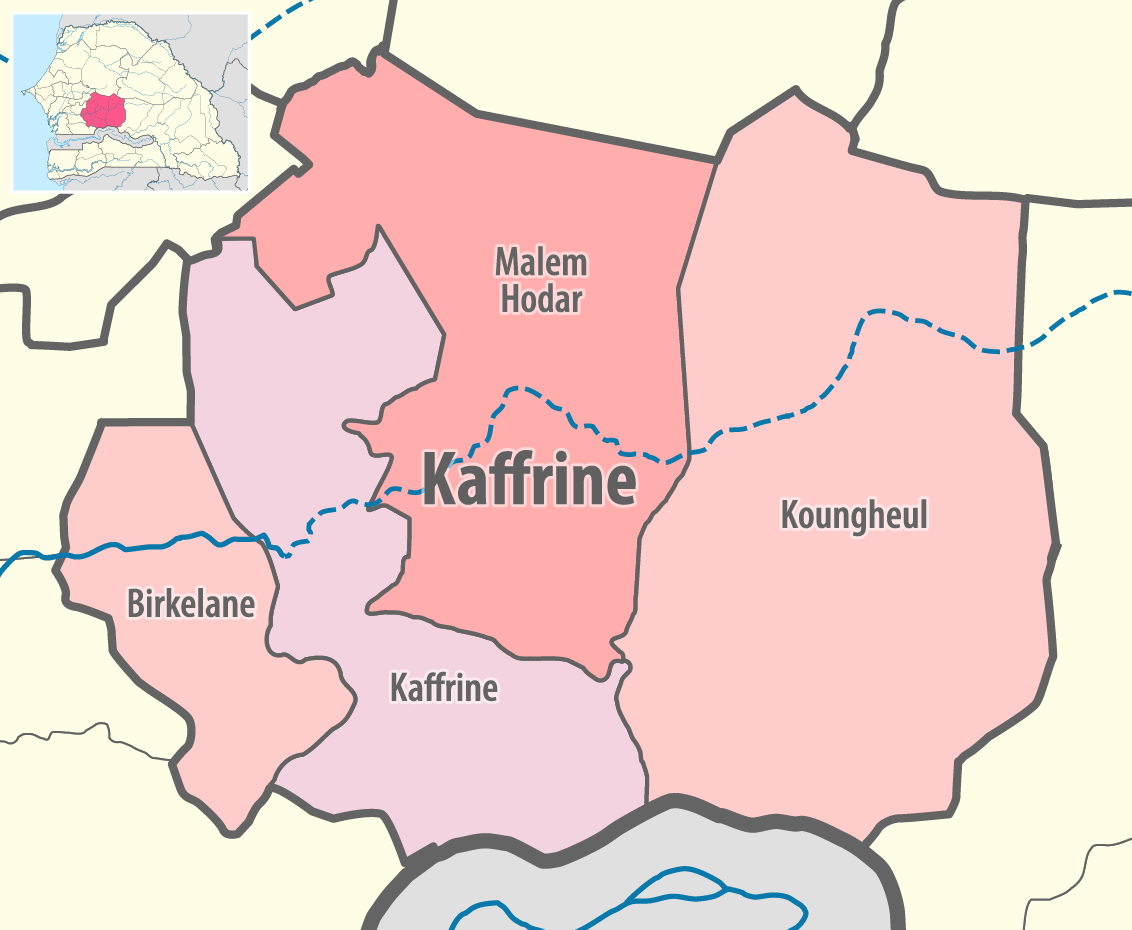
Departments of Kaffrine region

- Kaffrine department
- Birkilane department
- Koungheul department
- Malem Hoddar department

== Kaolack region ==
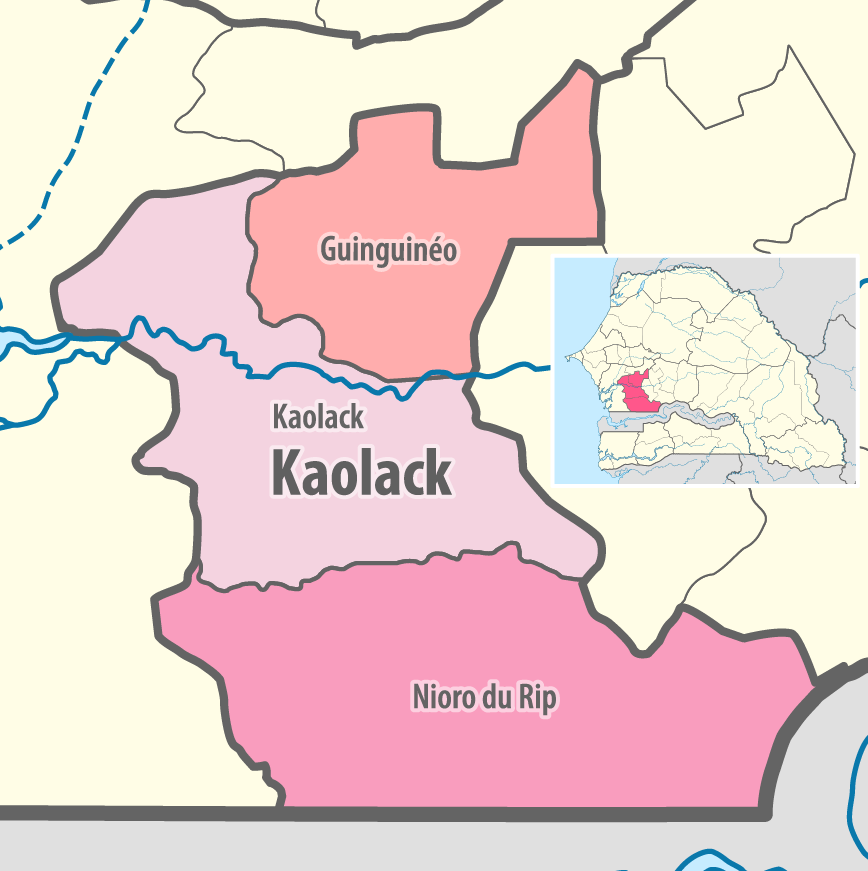
Departments of Kaolack region

- Guinguinéo department
- Kaolack department
- Nioro du Rip department

== Kédougou region ==
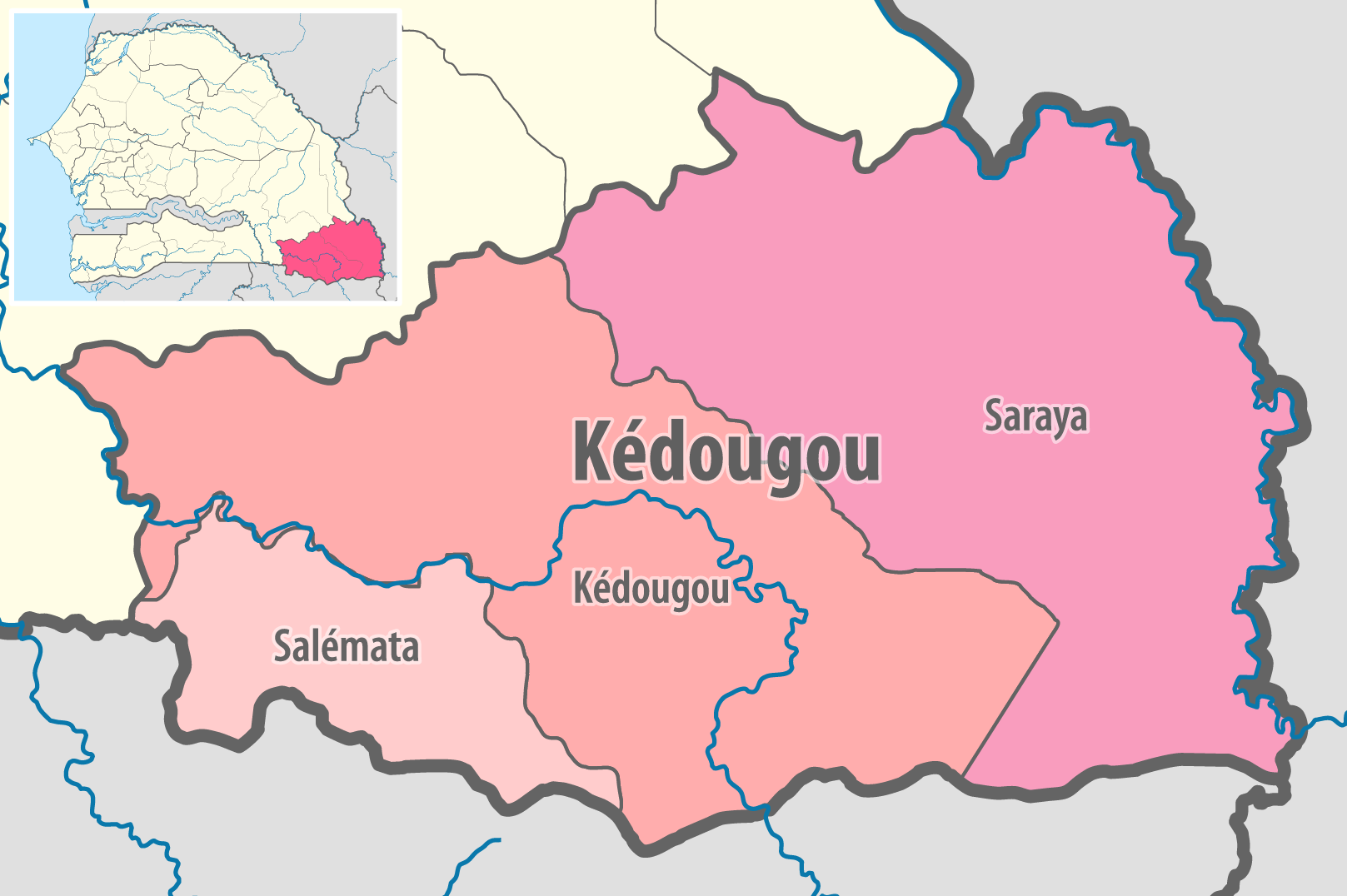
Departments of Kédougou region

- Kédougou department
- Salémata department
- Saraya department

== Kolda region ==
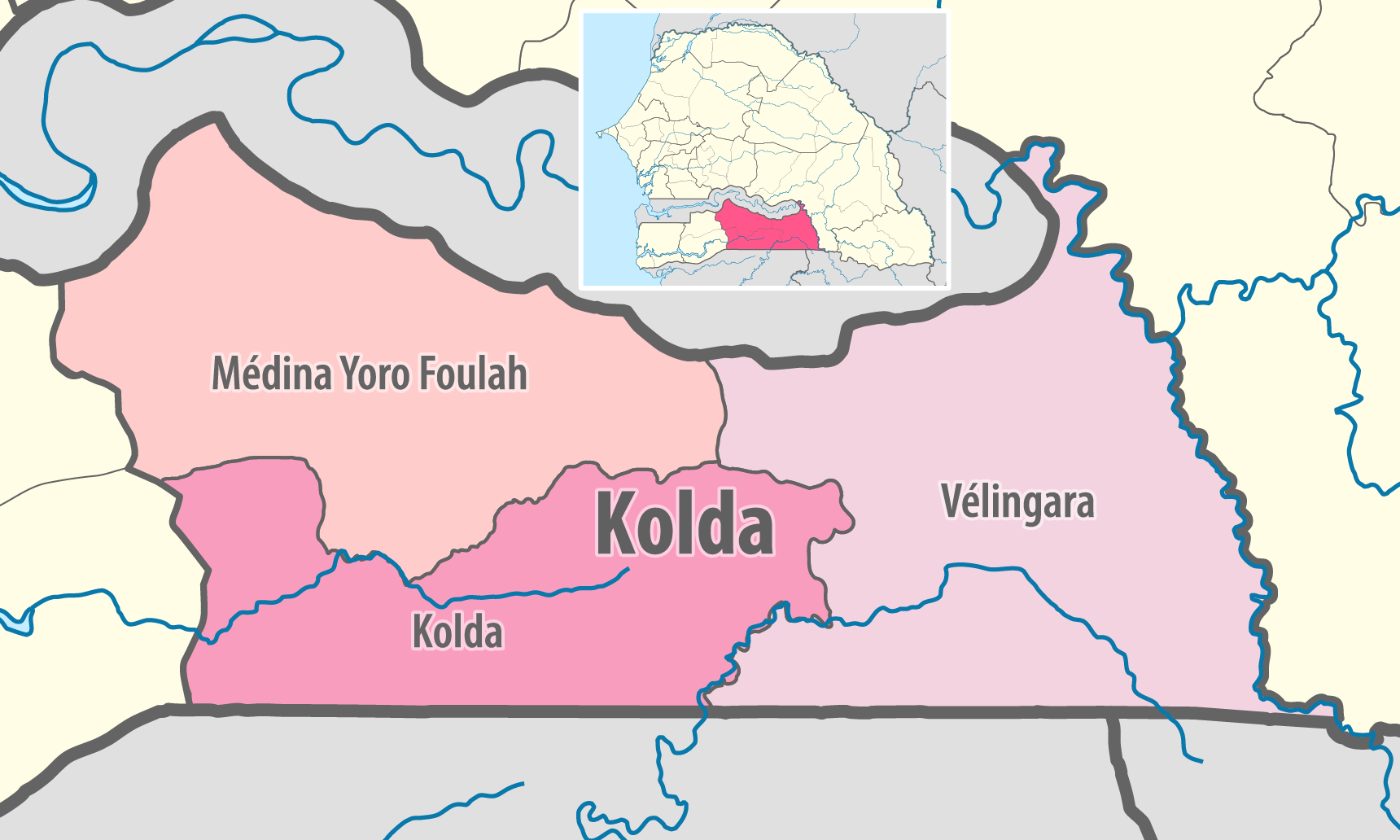
Departments of Kolda region

- Kolda department
- Médina Yoro Foulah department
- Vélingara department

== Louga region ==
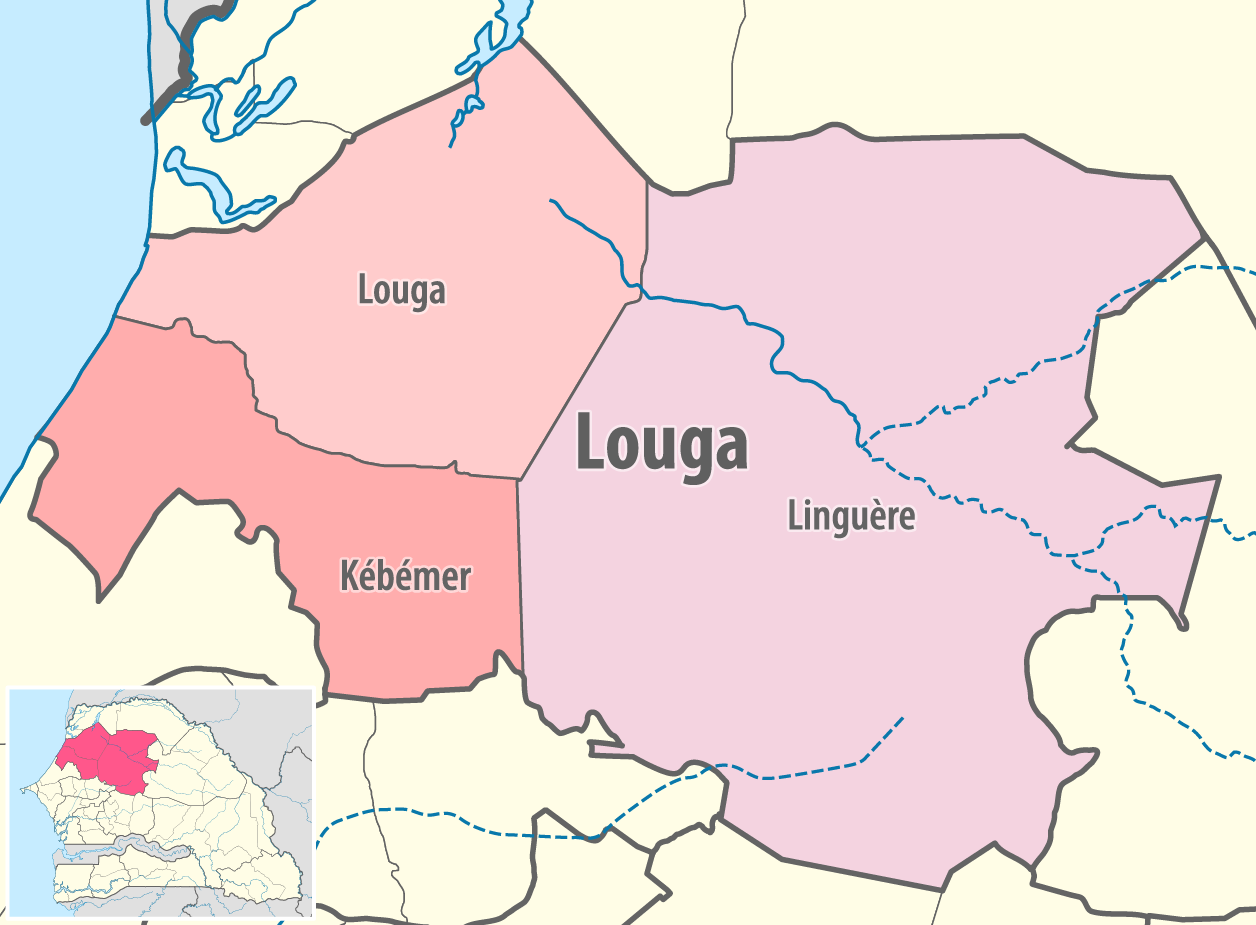
Departments of Louga region

- Kébémer department
- Linguère department
- Louga department

== Matam region ==
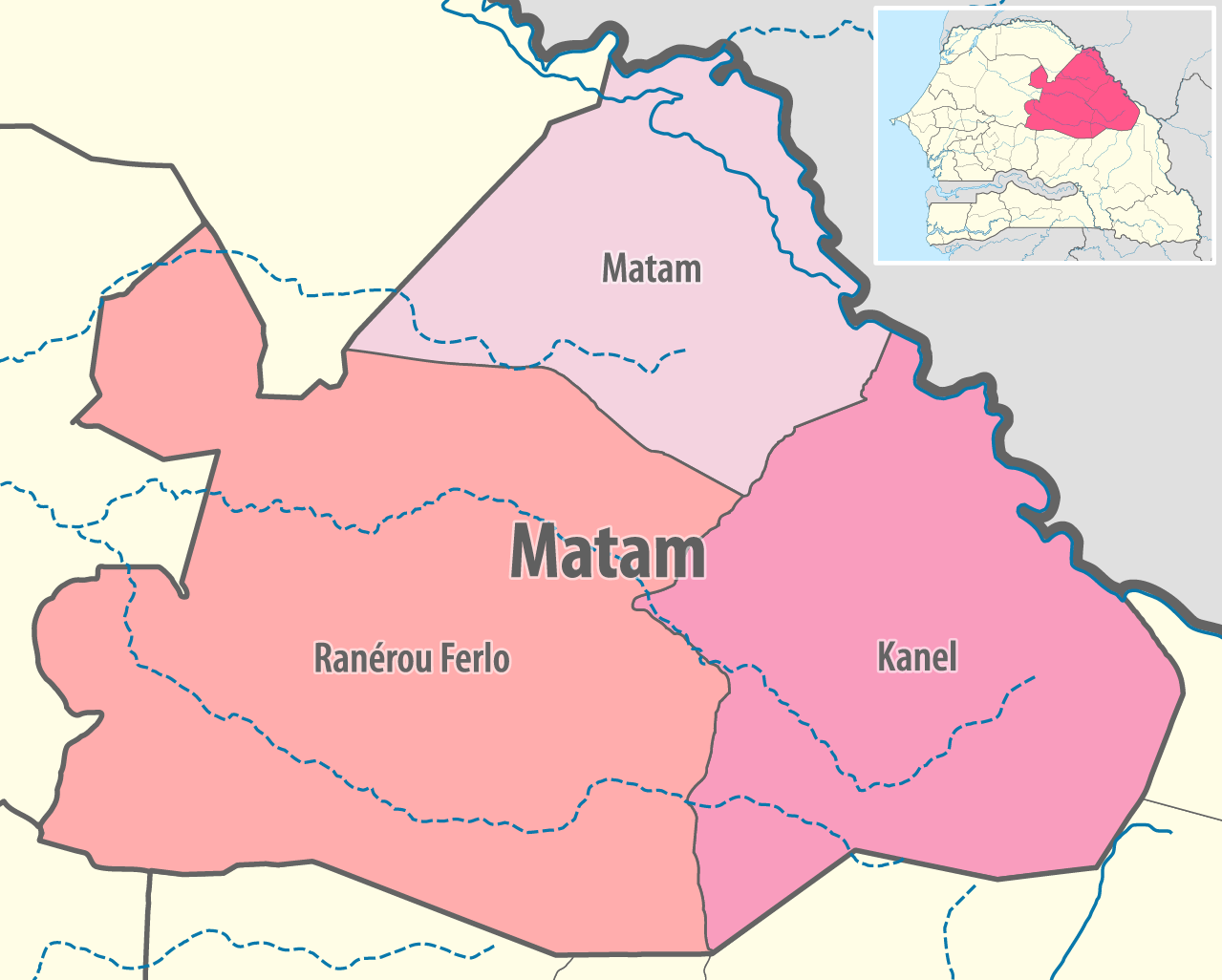
Departments of Matam region

- Kanel department
- Matam department
- Ranérou Ferlo department

== Saint-Louis region ==
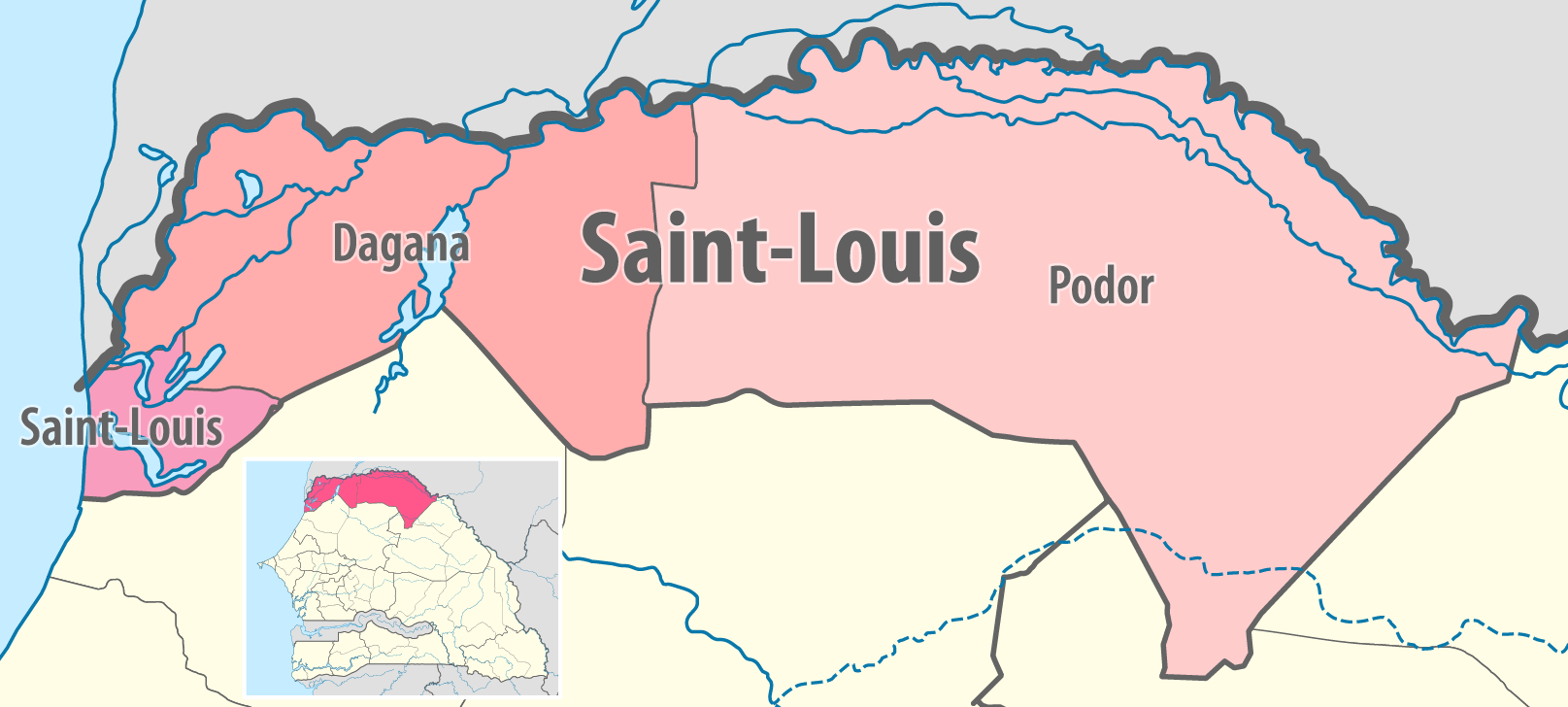
Departments of Saint-Louis region

- Dagana department
- Podor department
- Saint-Louis department

== Sédhiou region ==
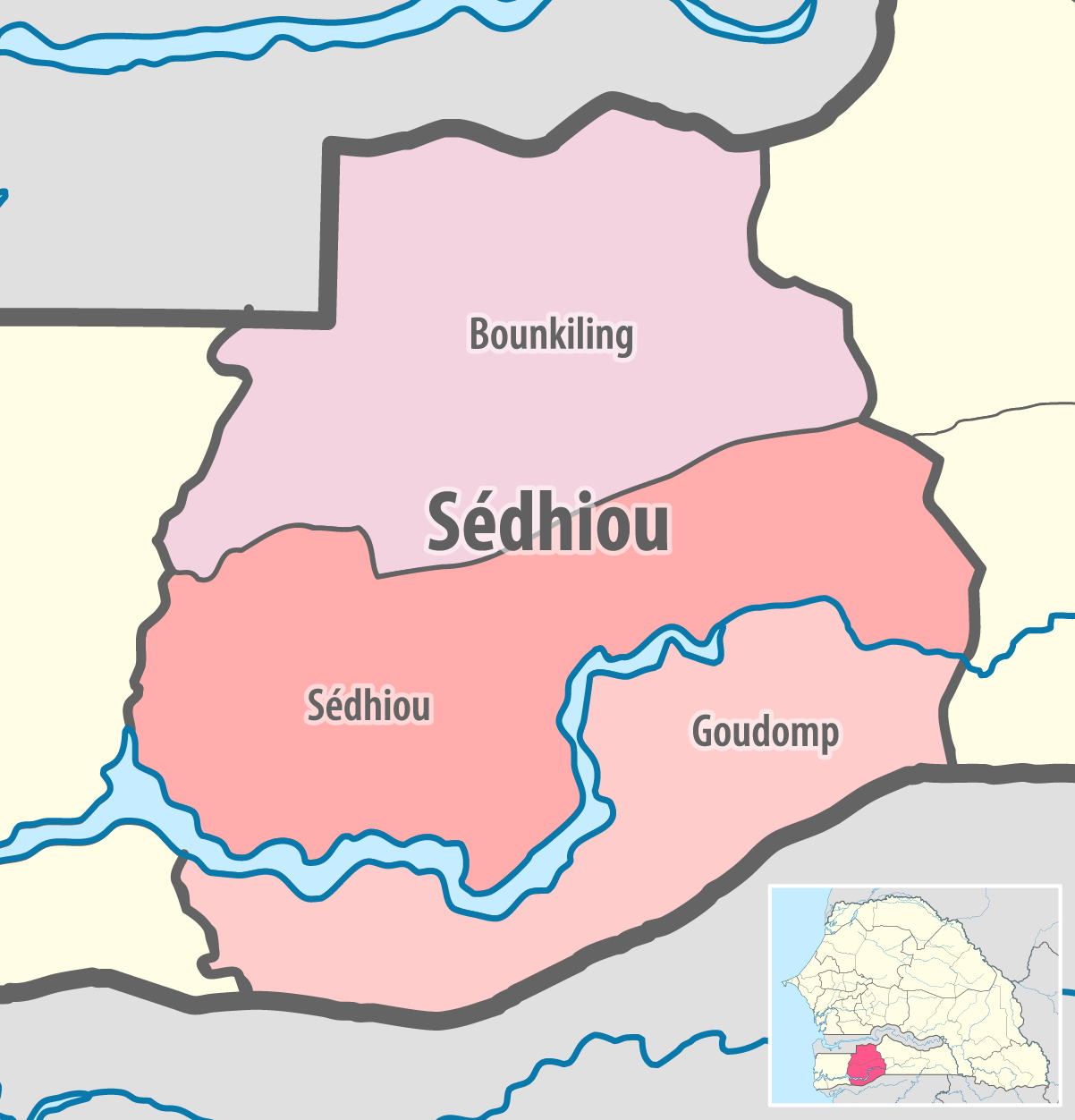
Departments of Sédhiou region

- Bounkiling department
- Goudomp department
- Sédhiou department

== Tambacounda region ==
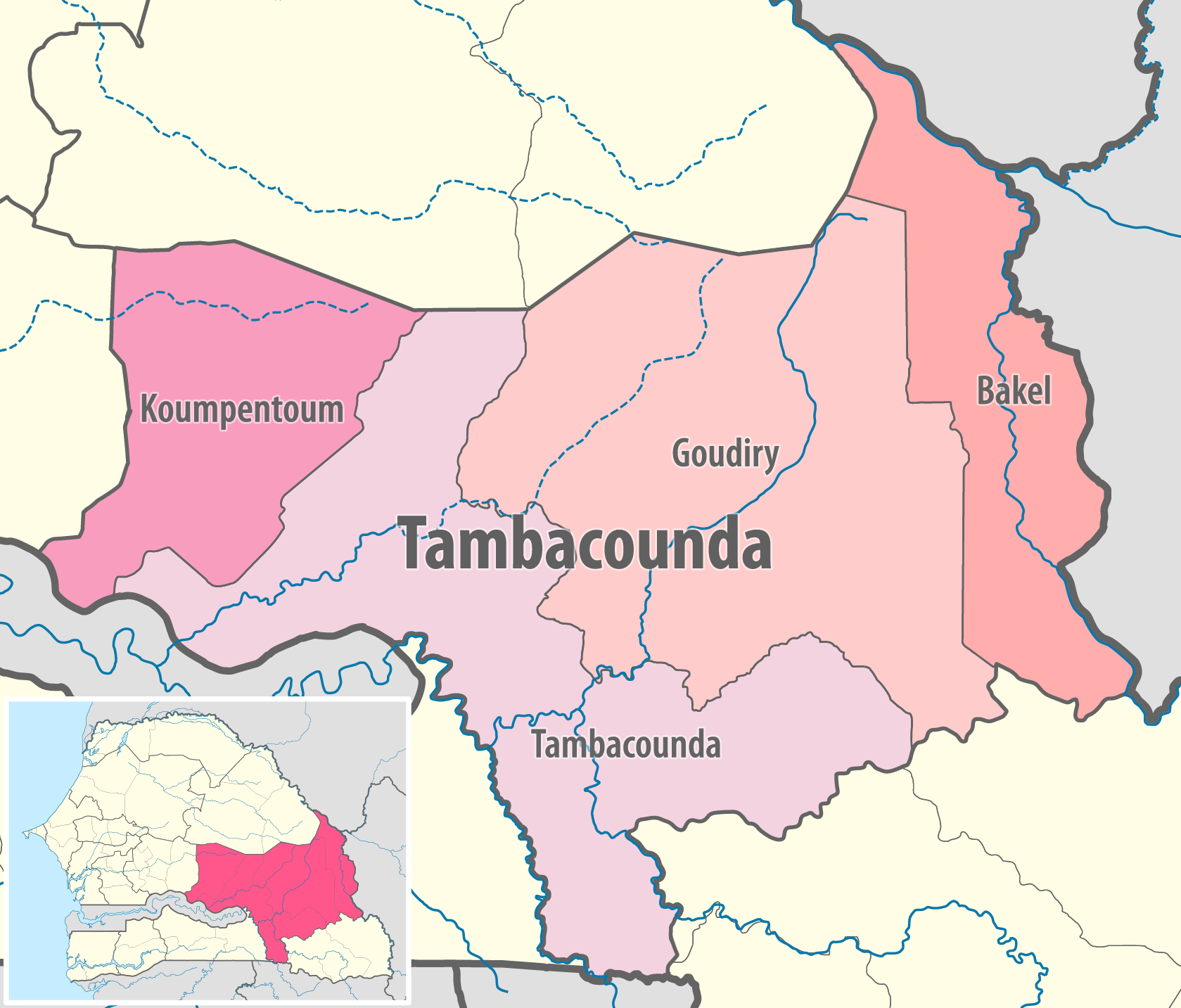
Departments of Tambacounda region

- Bakel department
- Goudiry department
- Koumpentoum department
- Tambacounda department

== Thiès region ==
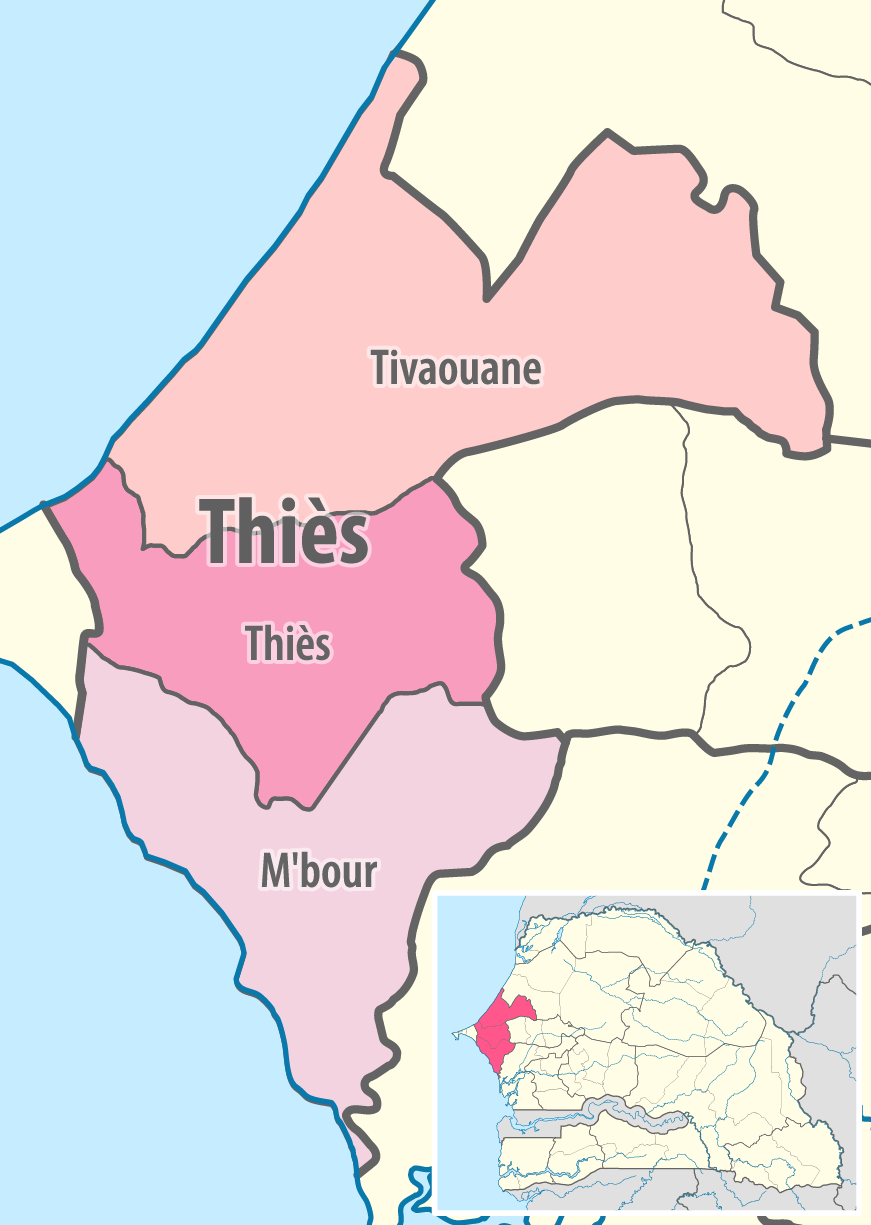
Departments of Thies region

- M'bour department
- Thiès department
- Tivaouane department

== Ziguinchor region ==
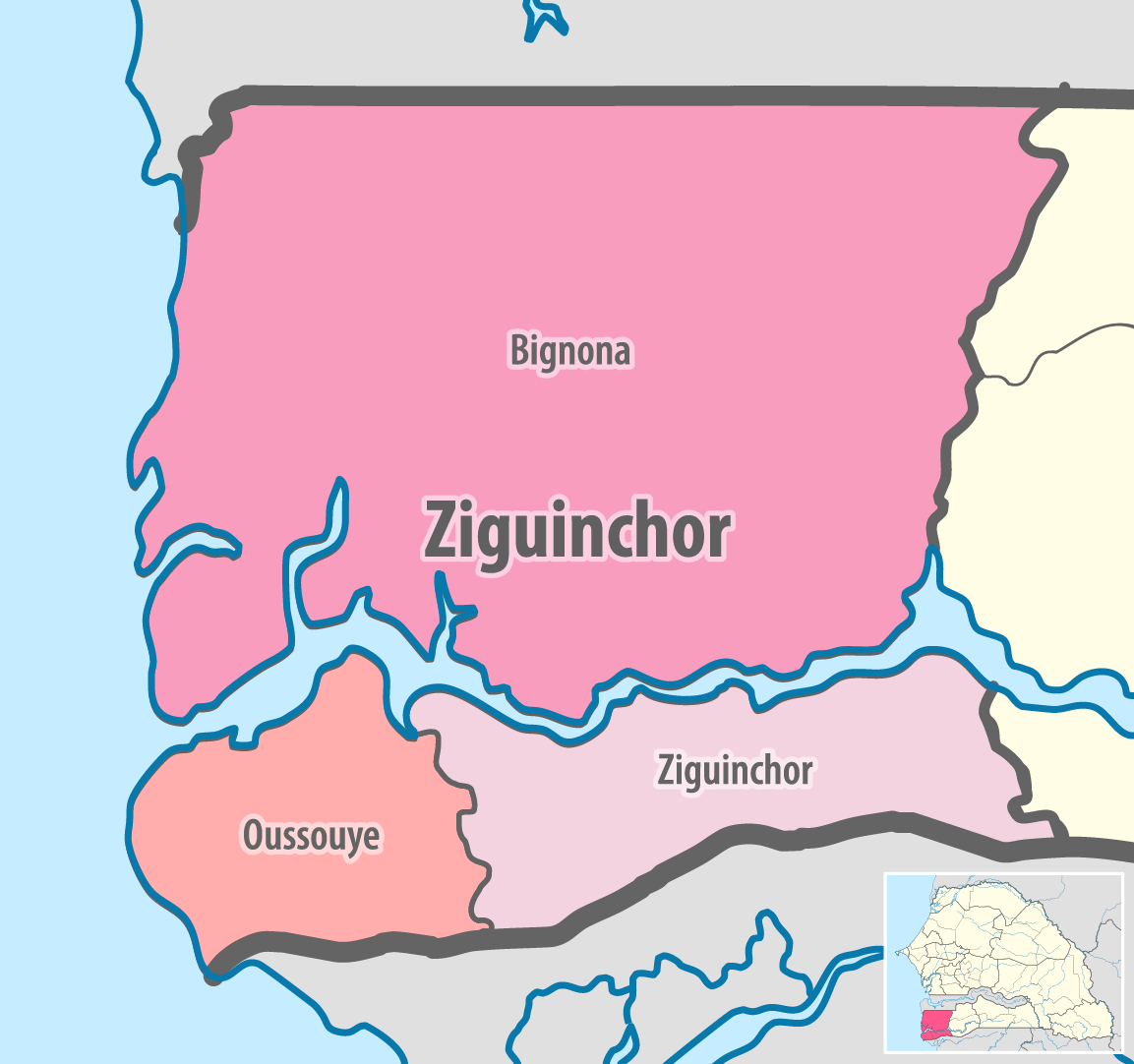
Departments of Ziguinchor region

- Bignona department
- Oussouye department
- Ziguinchor department

== See also ==
- Regions of Senegal
- Arrondissements of Senegal
