= Ziguinchor region =

Ziguinchor Region Région de Ziguinchor (French) Diiwaanu Siggcoor (Wolof)
- Region
- Location of Ziguinchor in Senegal

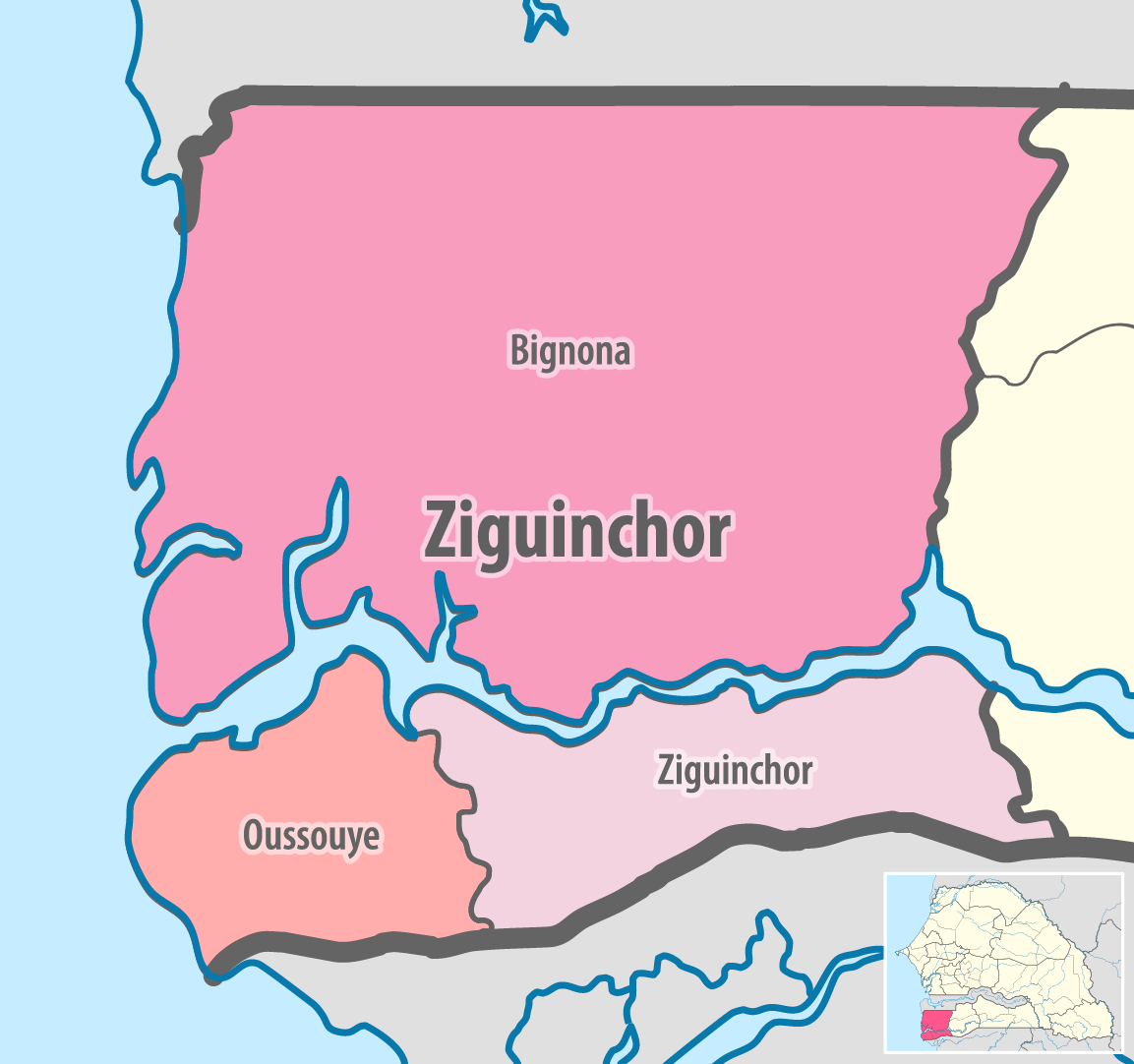
- Ziguinchor région, divided into 3 départements
- Coordinates: 12°47′N 16°13′W
- Country: Senegal
- Capital: Ziguinchor
- Départements: List: Bignona; Oussouye; Ziguinchor

Area
  - Total: 7,352 km^{2} (2,839 sq mi)

Population (2023 census)
  - Total: 612,343
  - Density: 83.29/km^{2} (215.7/sq mi)
- Time zone: UTC+0 (GMT)
- HDI (2021): 0.589 medium · 2nd

Ziguinchor is a region of Senegal (regional capitals have the same name as their respective regions). The region is also referred to historically and popularly as Basse Casamance.

== Departments ==
Ziguinchor region is divided into 3 departments:

- Bignona département
- Oussouye département
- Ziguinchor département
