= Nyassia Arrondissement =

- Arrondissement
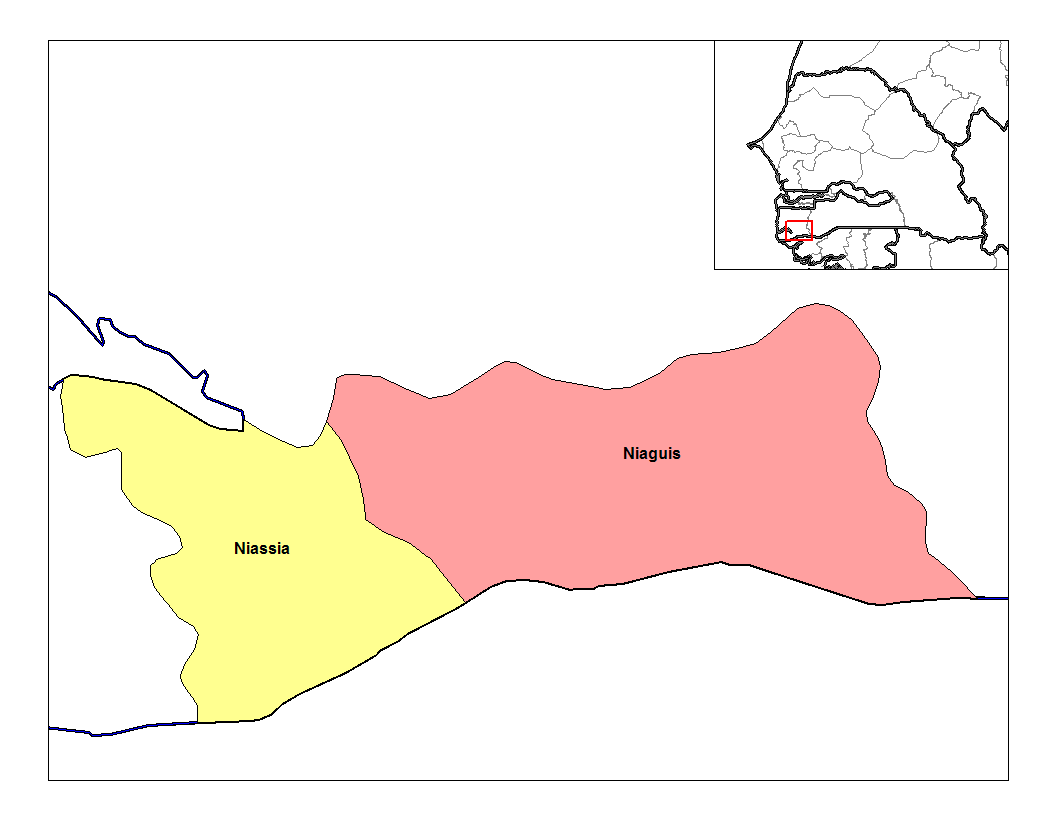
- Location in the Ziguinchor Department
- Country: Senegal
- Region: Ziguinchor Region
- Department: Ziguinchor Department

Area
  - Total: 461 km^{2} (178 sq mi)

Population (2013 census)
  - Total: 9,741
  - Density: 21.1/km^{2} (54.7/sq mi)
- Time zone: UTC±00:00 (GMT)

Nyassia Arrondissement is an arrondissement of the Ziguinchor Department in the Ziguinchor Region of Senegal. The principal town is Nyassia.

== Subdivisions ==
The arrondissement is divided administratively into 2 rural communities (Communautés rurales) and in turn into villages.

Communautés rurales

Enampore CR	Nyassia CR
14 villages: Badiatte; Bandial; Bamole; Batimin; Brin; Djibonker; Enampore; Essyl; Etama; Kamogueul; Le reste; Mamatoro; Médina; Séléki	25 villages: Bacounoun; Badème; Bafican; Bagame; Bassèré; Bougnack; Boffa Boyote; Bouhouyou; Darsalam; Dialang; Dioher; Ediouma; Etafoune; Etomé; Kadiéné; Kaguitte; Kailou; Kaléane; Kassoulou; Kassou Sénégal; Katouré; Kouring; Mahamouda; Nyassia; Toubacouta
