= Seleki =

- Village
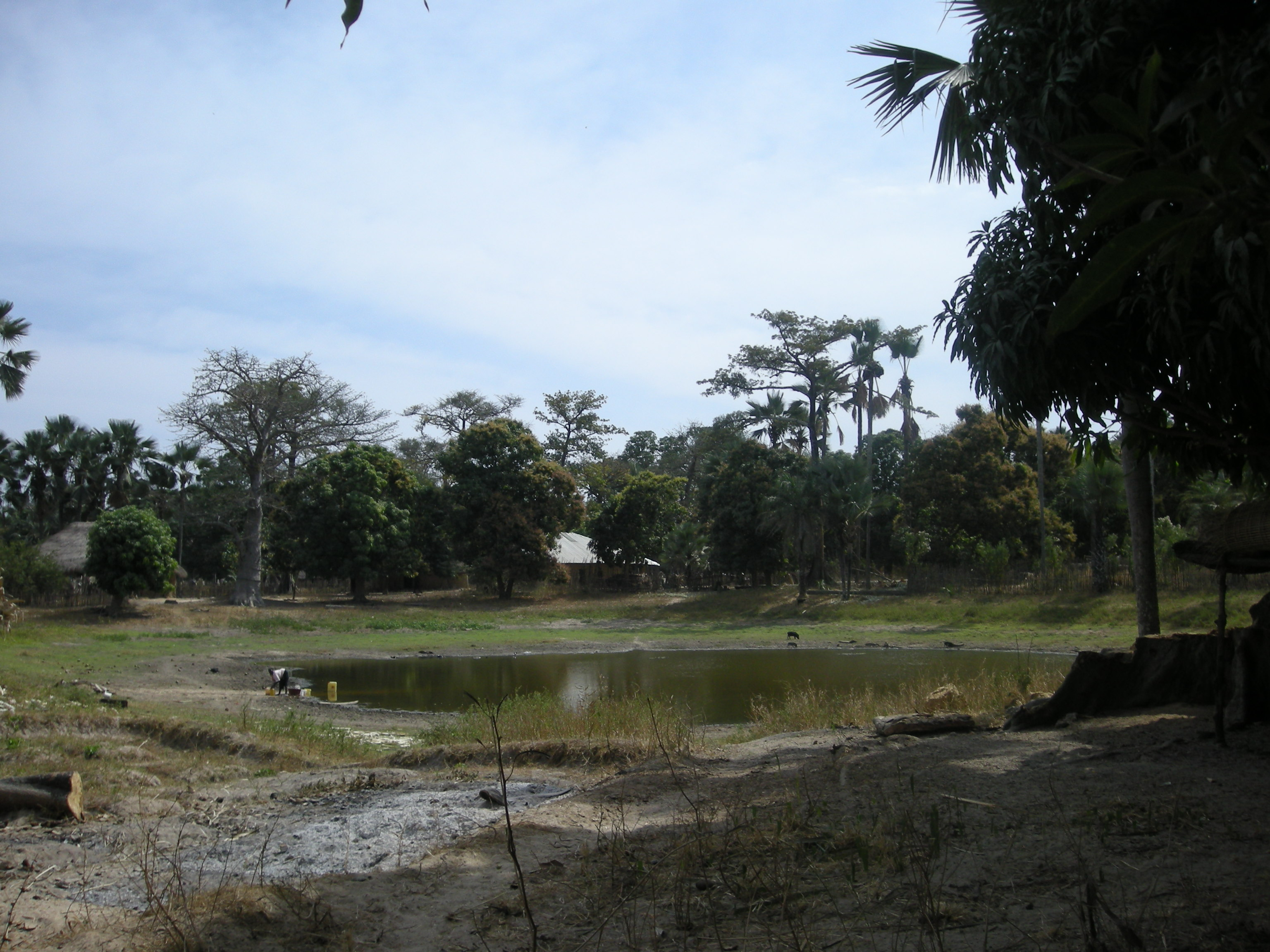

- Location within Senegal
- Coordinates: 12°30′14″N 16°42′52″W
- Country: Senegal
- Region: Ziguinchor
- Department: Ziguinchor

Seleki is a village in Basse Casamance in the south of Senegal. The presence of cases à impluvium, typical of Jola architecture, greatly contribute to the reputation of the village.

== History ==
Seleki is also the name of an ancient kingdom as well as of an ethnic group in a region that was very resistant to French colonialism. Several French soldiers were killed at the Battle of Seleki on December 1, 1886, including Lieutenant Truche.

On May 17, 1906, when Djignabo Badji, a charismatic leader and fetish leader of the Seleki who was believed to be indestructible, led an attack against French troops led by Lieutenant Lauque, Badji was killed and subsequently entered into local legend.

The boukout, an initiation ceremony, took place in Seleki in 1972.

== Administration ==
Seleki is part of the rural community of Enampore, Nyassia, Ziguinchor.

== Geography ==
Seleki is located within walking distance of the left bank of the estuary of the Casamance River. The closest villages are Etama, Enampore, Essyl, and Batinière.

=== Flora ===
The village is surrounded by lush vegetation, including many Palmyra Palms and mangos.

=== Population ===
Seleki is one of the few villages where people still speak Bandial.

=== Economy ===
Seleki's economy relies mainly on rice and a little discovery tourism.

An application for registration of all the Bandial cases à impluvium on the World Heritage List was filed with UNESCO on November 18, 2005.

== Gallery ==
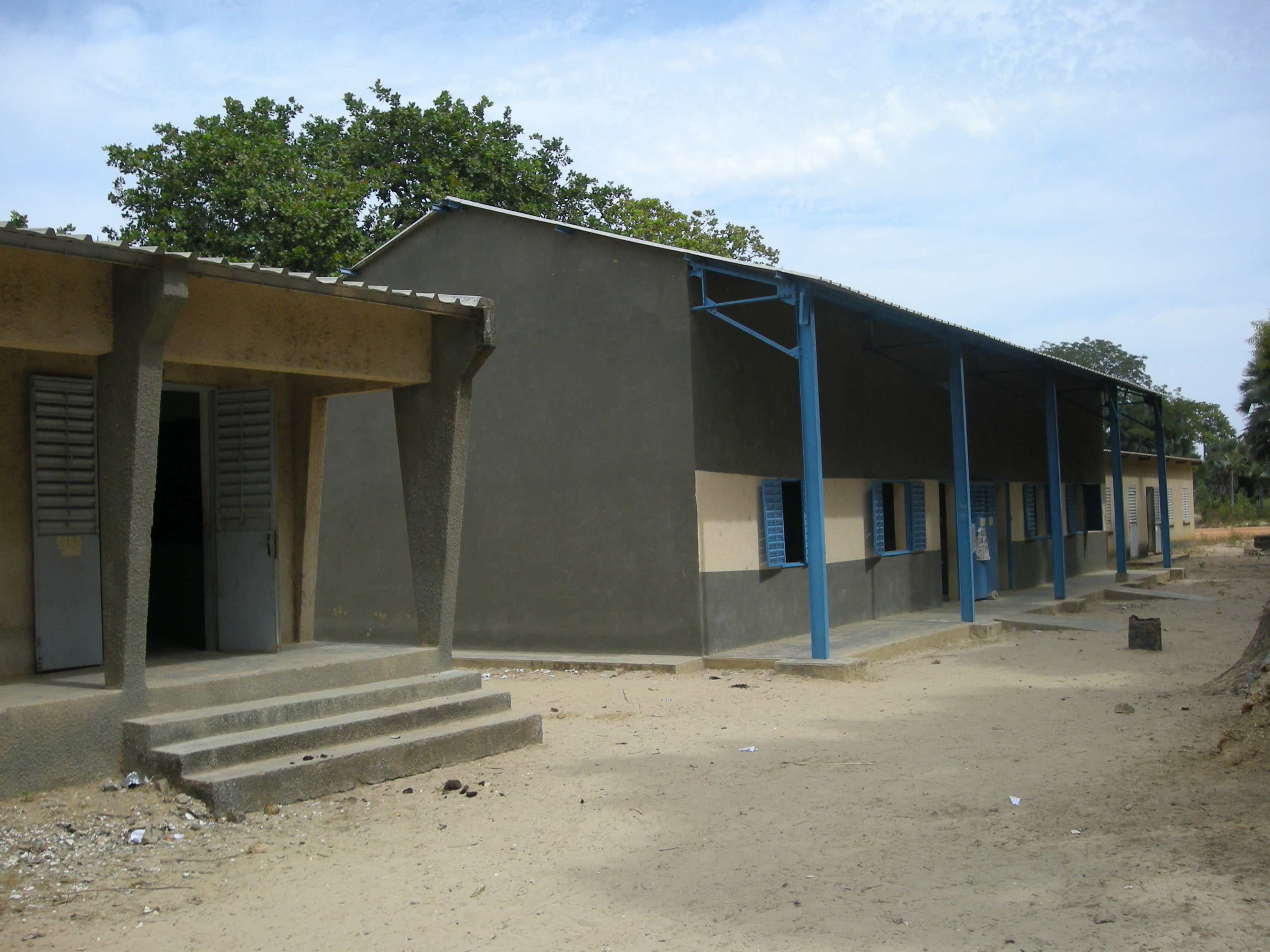
Primary school

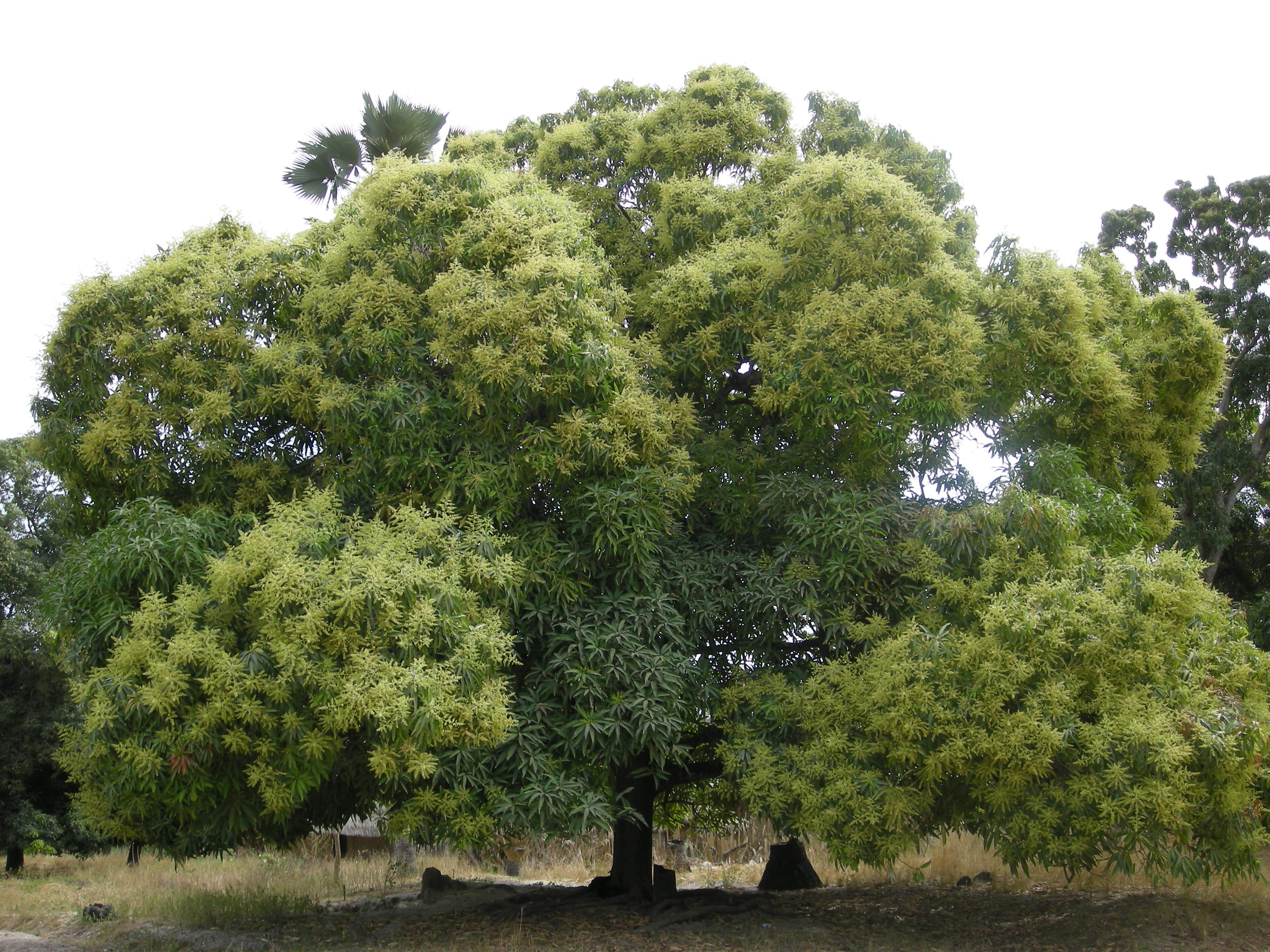
A mango

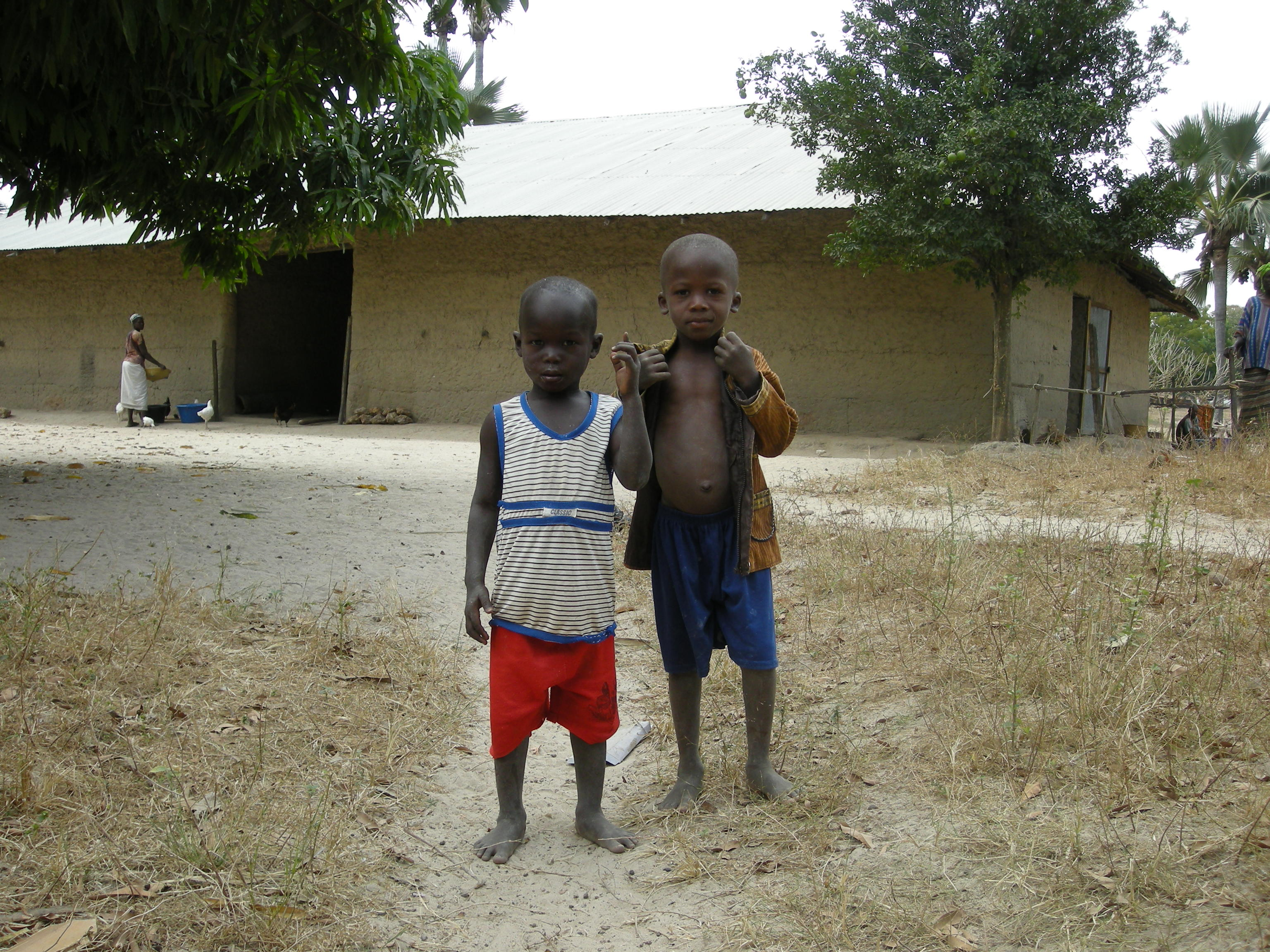
Bandial-speaking children

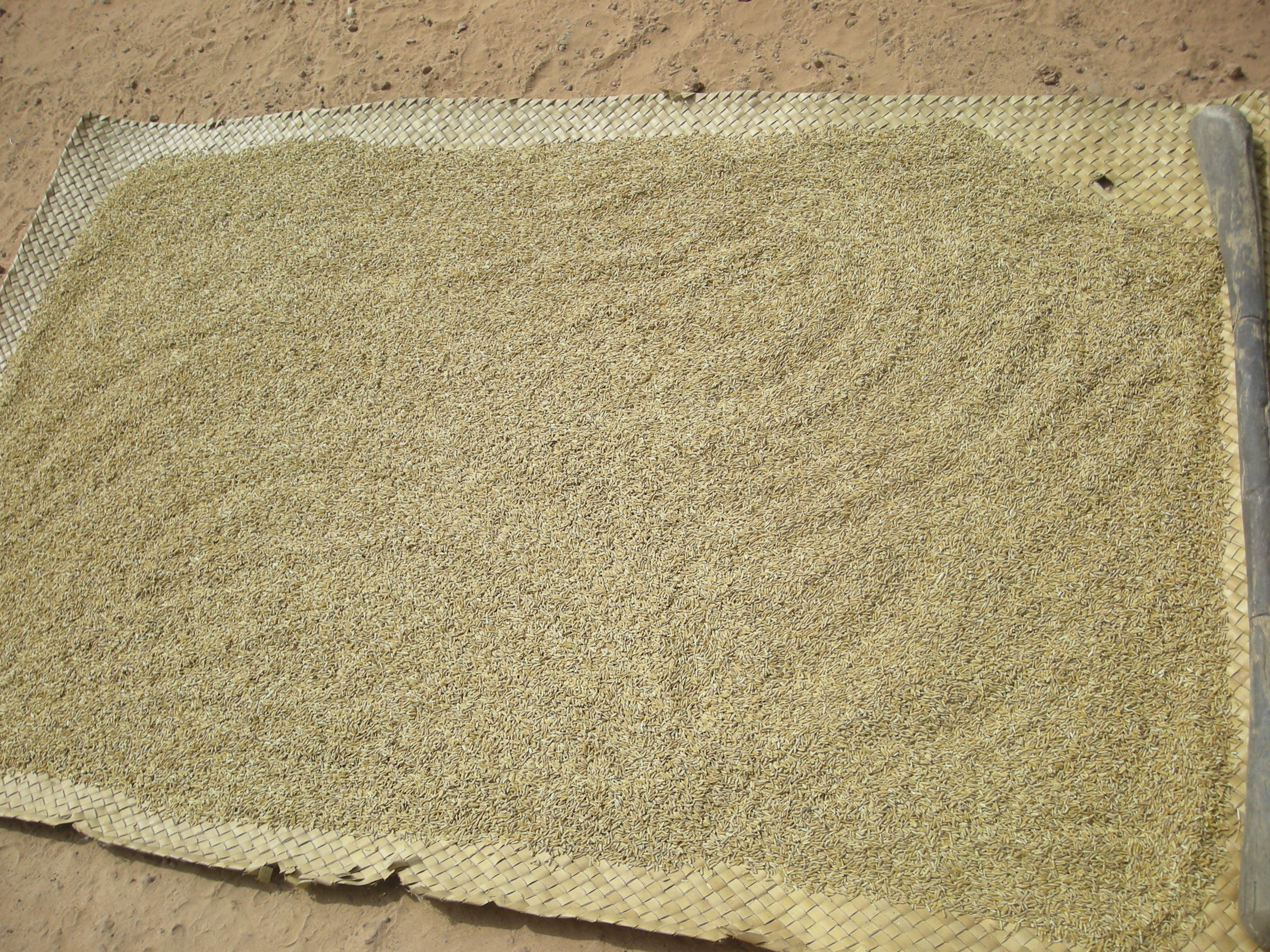
Drying rice

== See also ==
- Christian Roche (2000). Histoire de la Casamance : Conquête et résistance 1850-1920 (in French). Karthala. p. 408. ISBN 2-86537-125-5.
- Muriel Scibilia (2003). La Casamance ouvre ses cases. Tourisme au Sénégal (in French). L’Harmattan. p. 174. ISBN 2-85802-676-9.
