= Badème =

- Village
- Location within Senegal
- Coordinates: 12°27′15″N 16°18′44″W
- Country: Senegal
- Region: Ziguinchor Region
- Department: Ziguinchor Department
- Arrondissement: Nyassia Arrondissement
- Commune: Nyassia

Population
  - Total: 646
- Time zone: UTC+0 (GMT)

Badème is a village in the rural community of Nyassia, Nyassia Arrondissement, Ziguinchor Department in the Ziguinchor Region of south-west Senegal, near the border with Guinée-Bissau.

Nearby villages include Bassèré, Bougnack, Kadiene, Goudoume, Atoure, Toubacouta, Babonda, Djililo and Bagame.

According to PEPAM (Programme d'eau potable et d'assainissement du Millénaire), Badème has a population of 646 people living in 90 houses.

== History ==
During the Casamance conflict, many people living in Badème were forced to flee. Following the 2014 ceasefire, efforts were made to demine the region. However, as May 2025, some mines still remained in Badème and the neighboring village of Bougnack, and while Badème was slowly being repopulated, the population of Bougnack still had not returned.

== Bibliography ==
- (in French) Kalilou Diatta, La dynamique de l’espace rural dans la vallée de Nyassia : le terroir de Badème Basse-Casamance, Dakar, Université de Dakar, 1983, 95 p. (Mémoire de Maîtrise)
