= Mpack =

Mpack may refer to:

- Mpack, Senegal, a border crossing with Guinea-Bissau
- MPack (software), a malware kit developed in Russia
- mpack (Unix), a command-line MIME encoding and decoding utility

== See also ==
- MPAC (disambiguation)
