= Bindialoum Bainounk =

- Location in Senegal
- Coordinates: 12°28′16.6″N 16°10′21.7″W
- Country: Senegal
- Region: Ziguinchor Region
- Department: Ziguinchor
- Arrondissement: Niaguis
- Time zone: UTC+0 (GMT)

Bindialoum Bainounk is a settlement in Senegal.
