= Bindialoum Manjacque =

- Location in Senegal
- Coordinates: 12°27′24″N 16°10′12″W
- Country: Senegal
- Region: Ziguinchor Region
- Department: Ziguinchor
- Arrondissement: Niaguis
- Time zone: UTC+0 (GMT)

Bindialoum Manjacque is a settlement in Senegal.
