= Agnack Petit =

- Village
- Location in Senegal
- Coordinates: 12°34′19″N 16°7′19″W
- Country: Senegal
- Region: Ziguinchor
- Department: Ziguinchor
- Arrondissement: Niaguis
- Rural Community: Adéane

Population (2002)
  - Total: 1,212
- Time zone: UTC+0 (GMT)

Agnack Petit is a village the Ziguinchor Department of the Ziguinchor Region in the Basse Casamance area of southern Senegal.

In the 2002 census the population was counted as 1212 inhabitants in 169 households.
