= Baraka Patata =

- Location in Senegal
- Coordinates: 12°27′40.0″N 16°08′41.2″W
- Country: Senegal
- Region: Ziguinchor Region
- Department: Ziguinchor
- Arrondissement: Niaguis
- Time zone: UTC+0 (GMT)

Baraka Patata is a settlement in Senegal located in Lower Casamance, near the border with Guinea-Bissau. It is part of the rural community of Boutoupa-Camaracounda, in the Niaguis Arrondissement, Ziguinchor Department, and Ziguinchor Region.

As of the last census in 2002, the village had a population of 56 residents and 8 households.
