= Agnack Grand =

- Village
- Location in Senegal
- Coordinates: 12°34′19″N 16°6′17″W
- Country: Senegal
- Region: Ziguinchor
- Department: Ziguinchor
- Arrondissement: Niaguis
- Rural Community: Adéane

Population (2002)
  - Total: 114
- Time zone: UTC+0 (GMT)

Agnack Grand is a village in the Ziguinchor Department of Ziguinchor Region in the Basse Casamance area of south Senegal.

In the 2002 census 114 inhabitants were recorded.
