= Baghagha (Adéane) =

- Location in Senegal
- Coordinates: 12°36′23″N 16°3′21″W
- Country: Senegal
- Region: Ziguinchor
- Department: Ziguinchor
- Arrondissement: Niaguis
- Rural Community: Adéane

Population (2002)
  - Total: 2,189
- Time zone: UTC+0 (GMT)

Baghagha is a village in Ziguinchor Department in the Ziguinchor Region in the area of Basse Casamance in the south-west of Senegal.

In the 2002 census 2,189 inhabitants in 305 households were recorded.
