= Bissine =

Settlement and forest in Ziguinchor Region, Senegal

- Location in Senegal
- Coordinates: 12°31′50″N 15°57′31″W
- Country: Senegal
- Region: Ziguinchor
- Department: Ziguinchor
- Arrondissement: Niaguis
- Rural Community: Adéane

Population (2002)
  - Total: 743
- Time zone: UTC+0 (GMT)

Bissine is a settlement and forest in Senegal. The village is in Ziguinchor Department of Ziguinchor Region in the area of Basse Casamance. In the 2002 census it had a population of 743 in 104 households.

The nearby forest of Bissine is a classified reserve.
