= Baraka Pakao =

- Location in Senegal
- Coordinates: 12°28′50.5″N 16°11′18.3″W
- Country: Senegal
- Region: Ziguinchor Region
- Department: Ziguinchor
- Arrondissement: Niaguis
- Time zone: UTC+0 (GMT)

Baraka Pakao is a settlement in Senegal.
