= Boucotte Mancagne =

- Interactive map of Boucotte Mancagne
- Country: Senegal
- Region: Ziguinchor
- Department: Ziguinchor
- Arrondissement: Niaguis
- Commune: Niaguis

Population (2015)
  - Total: 449
- Time zone: UTC+0 (GMT)

Boucotte Mancagne is a settlement in Ziguinchor Department in Ziguinchor Region of the Basse Casamance area of south-west Senegal. The population of the village was estimated at 449 in 2015.
