= Bacounoun =

- Location in Senegal
- Coordinates: 12°27′N 16°25′W
- Country: Senegal
- Region: Ziguinchor
- Department: Ziguinchor
- Arrondissement: Nyassia
- Commune: Nyassia

Population (2002)
  - Total: 170
- Time zone: UTC+0 (GMT)

Bacounoun is a village in Senegal situated in Basse-Casamance, to the south-west of Nyassia. It is part of the rural district (communauté rurale] of Nyassia in the arrondissement of Nyassia, part of the department of Ziguinchor in the region of Ziguinchor.

At the census of 2002, the settlement contained 170 inhabitants in 24 habitations.
