= Marsassoum =

- Town and commune
- Location in Senegal
- Coordinates: 12°49′39″N 15°58′50″W
- Country: Senegal
- Region: Ziguinchor
- Department: Ziguinchor
- Arrondissement: Marsassoum

Area
  - Town and commune: 3.599 km^{2} (1.390 sq mi)

Population (2023 census)
  - Town and commune: 9,815
  - Density: 2,727/km^{2} (7,063/sq mi)
- Time zone: UTC+0 (GMT)

Marsassoum is a small town and seat of the Marsassoum Arrondissement in the Ziguinchor Region of Senegal, roughly 33 kilometres (21 mi) from Ziguinchor. It lies on the bank of the Soungrougrou River. In 2023 it had a population of 9,815.

== History ==
During colonial times it was a centre of the slave trade. Children could be sold from 200 to 250 francs. Today there are significant populations of Mandinka people living in the vicinity.

On July 28, 2008, gendarmes opened fire on 10 demonstrators who had barricaded the roads in Marsassoum.

== Notable people ==
- Karamba Diaby (1961-)
