= Bilasse =

- Interactive map of Bilasse
- Country: Senegal
- Region: Ziguinchor
- Department: Ziguinchor
- Arrondissement: Niaguis
- Commune: Boutoupa-Camaracounda

Population (2002)
  - Total: 186
- Time zone: UTC+0 (GMT)

Bilasse is a village in the rural commune of Boutoupa-Camaracounda, in the Niaguis Arrondissement, in the Ziguinchor Department of the Ziguinchor Region. In 2002 it had a population of 186 people.
