= Boulome =

- Interactive map of Boulome
- Country: Senegal
- Region: Ziguinchor
- Department: Ziguinchor
- Arrondissement: Niaguis
- Rural Community: Niaguis

Population (2002)
  - Total: 692
- Time zone: UTC+0 (GMT)

Boulome is a settlement in Ziguinchor Department in Ziguinchor Region in the Basse Casamance area of south-west Senegal. The population at the 2002 census was recorded as 692.
