= Bagame =

- Location in Senegal
- Coordinates: 12°24′37″N 16°18′58″W
- Country: Senegal
- Region: Ziguinchor
- Department: Ziguinchor
- Arrondissement: Nyassia
- Rural community: Nyassia

Population (2002)
  - Total: 109
- Time zone: UTC+0 (GMT)

Bagame is a settlement in Ziguinchor Department in Ziguinchor Region in the Basse Casamance area of south-west Senegal, near the border with Guinea-Bissau The population in the 2002 census was 109 people in 15 households.

== Climate ==
Bagame has a warm climate for relatively the entire year with the wet months occurring during the summer months and peaking in August.

== Resources ==
"Bagame Monthly Climate Average, Senegal." Bagame, Senegal Weather Averages. N.p., n.d. Web. 11 Dec. 2015.

"Bagame Map — Satellite Images of Bagame." Bagame Map. N.p., 2005. Web. 11 Dec. 2015.
