= Bougnack =

Coordinates: 12°23′26″N 16°22′19″W

- Interactive map of Bougnack
- Country: Senegal
- Region: Casamance
- Department: Ziguinchor Department
- Arrondissement: Nyassia Arrondissement
- Commune: Nyassia
- Elevation: 10 m (33 ft)

Population (2013)
  - Total: 0
- Time zone: UTC+0 (GMT)

Bougnack, also known as Bouniak, is a settlement in Nyassia, Ziguinchor Department, Casamance, Senegal.

== History ==
In 1963, during the Portuguese Colonial War, Portuguese military forces caused an incident which would go on to be decried by the United Nations in United Nations Security Council Resolution 178.

During the Casamance conflict, the town's population completely fled. As of 2013, the settlement was still depopulated. Following the 2014 ceasefire, efforts were made to demine the region. However, as May 2025, some mines still remained in Bougnack and the neighboring village of Badème, and while Badème was slowly being repopulated, the population of Bougnack still had not returned.

In 2017, the village of Bougnack was included in a list of villages near the border with Guinea-Bissau as part of an initiative for peace.

== Geography ==
Bougnack is located in the Nyassia commune, near villages such as Badème.
