= Baraka Bounao =

- Location in Senegal
- Coordinates: 12°29′43″N 16°11′36″W
- Country: Senegal
- Region: Ziguinchor
- Department: Ziguinchor
- Arrondissement: Niaguis
- Rural community: Boutoupa-Camaracounda
- Time zone: UTC+0 (GMT)

Baraka Bounao is a settlement in the Ziguinchor Department in the Ziguinchor Region in the Basse Casamance area of south-west Senegal. In the 2002 census, the village contained 189 inhabitants in 26 households.
