= Baraf =

- Location in Senegal
- Coordinates: 12°31′14″N 16°18′31″W
- Country: Senegal
- Region: Ziguinchor
- Department: Ziguinchor
- Arrondissement: Niaguis
- Commune: Niaguis

Population (2002)
  - Total: 489
- Time zone: UTC+0 (GMT)

Baraf is a settlement in Ziguinchor Department in Ziguinchor Region in the Basse Casamance area of south-west Senegal.

In the 2002 census 489 inhabitants in 68 households were recorded.
