= MPAC =

MPAC or Mpac may refer to:

- The Malaria Policy Advisory Committee
- The Municipal Property Assessment Corporation, headquartered in Pickering, Ontario, Canada
- The Muslim Public Affairs Council, headquartered in Los Angeles, California, United States
- The Muslim Public Affairs Committee UK, headquartered in the United Kingdom
- The Malawi Public Affairs Committee, a Muslim religious body in Malawi
- The Metropolitan Performing Arts Center in Spokane, Washington, United States
- The Manufacturers' Political Action Committee of the Illinois Manufacturers' Association
- The Multipurpose Assault Craft, a class of fast military assault boat by the Philippine Navy

== See also ==
- Mpack, Senegal, a border crossing with Guinea-Bissau
- Experimental Media and Performing Arts Center (EMPAC)
- Muslim American Public Affairs Council, headquartered in Raleigh, North Carolina, United States
- Modular Protection Automation & Control (MPAC), modular control buildings for substations
