= São Domingos (Guinea-Bissau) =

Sector and city of the Cacheu Region in Guinea-Bissau

- Sector and city
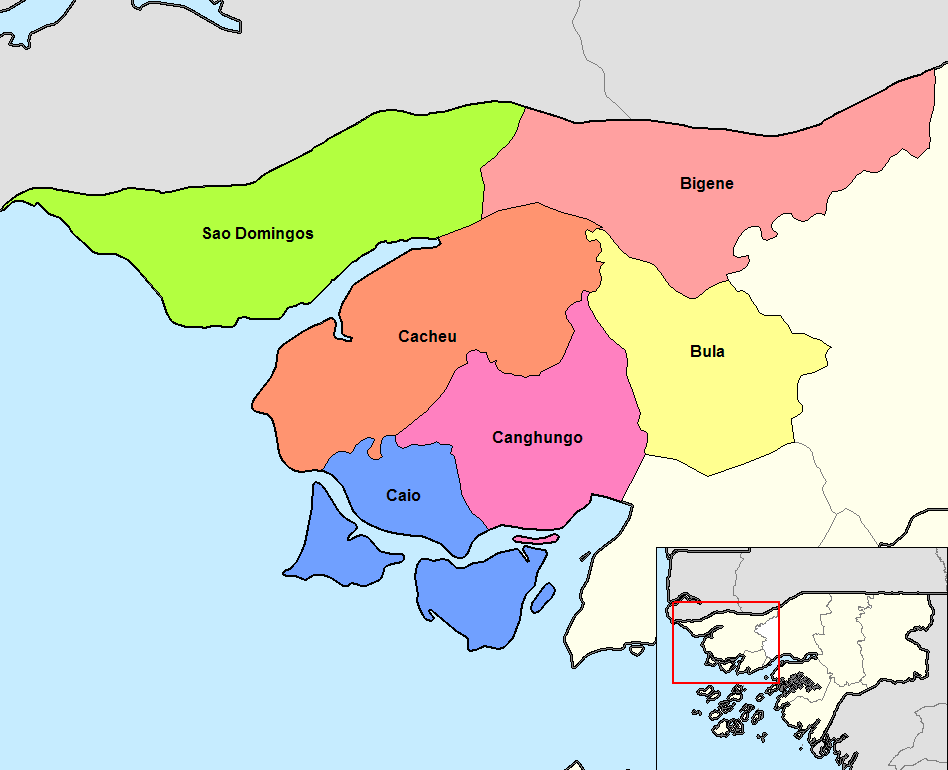
- A map showing the sectors of Guinea-Bissau; São Domingos is on the left in green.
- Interactive map of São Domingos
- Coordinates: 12°24′07″N 16°12′02″W
- Country: Guinea-Bissau
- Region: Cacheu
- Time zone: UTC+0:00 (GMT)

São Domingos is both a Sector and a city in the Cacheu Region of Guinea-Bissau. The sector contains the main border checkpoint to Senegal between Jegue (on the Guinean side), Mpack on the Senegalese.

== History ==
There was a Portuguese trading post at Sao Domingos (known in the local Banyum language as Buguendo) at least as early 1535, by which point it had attained a semi-unofficial status. In the late sixteenth century, however, relations between the Portuguese lançados and the native Bainuk people deteriorated. The late 1570s saw the Europeans invite the king of Kassa to attack the town; despite this victory, conditions did not improve, and the traders relocated to another town further upriver. This experiment likewise failed, and the center of the lancados trade moved across the river to Cacheu.

In 2016 it was announced that this border crossing would be significantly developed with funding from the UEMOA.
