= Baïla =

- Village
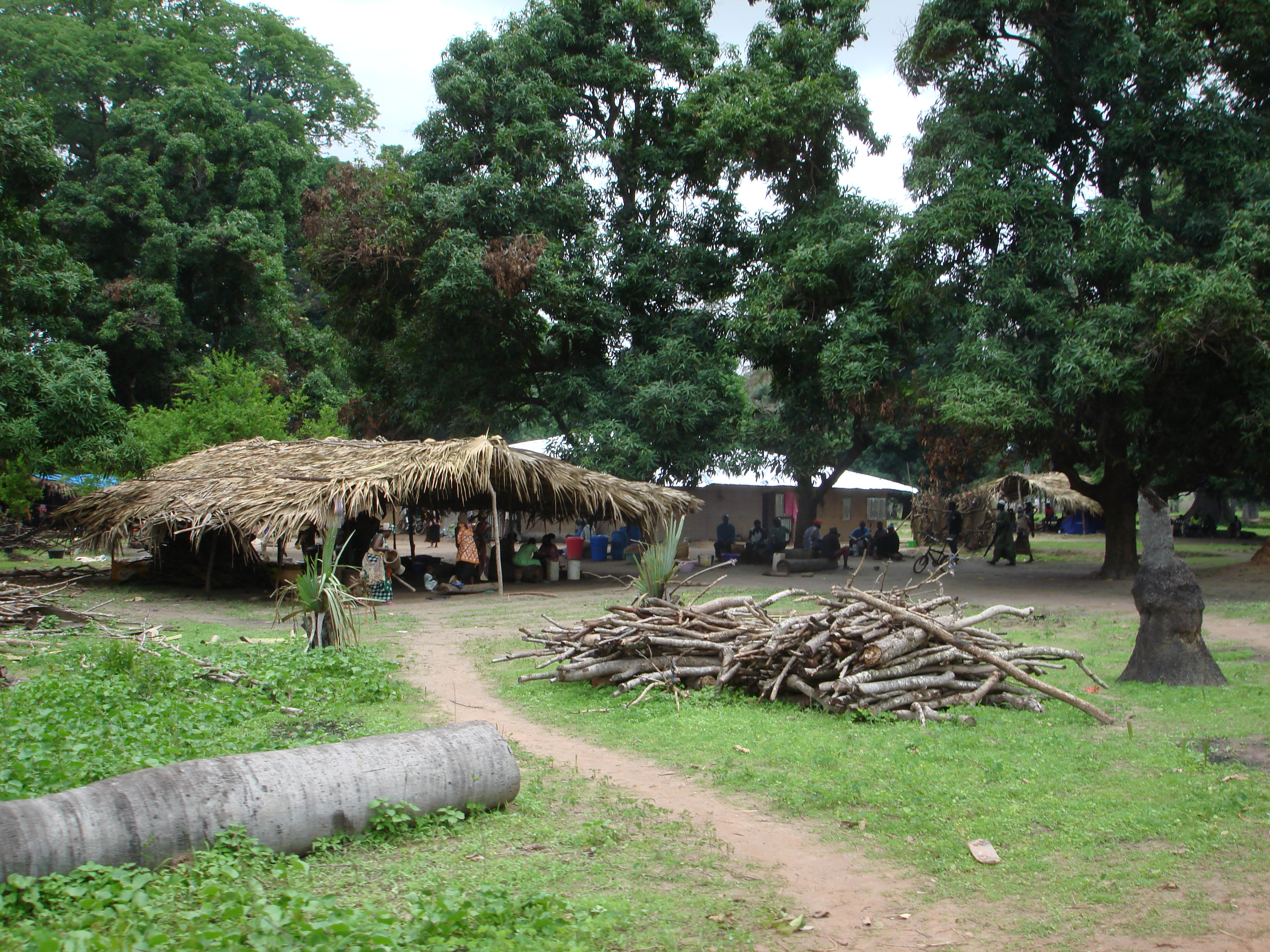
- Lush vegetation

- Location within Senegal
- Coordinates: 12°53′39″N 16°21′8″W
- Country: Senegal
- Region: Ziguinchor
- Department: Bignona

Population
  - Total: 1,287

Baïla is a village in the rural community of Suelle, Sindian, Bignona, Ziguinchor, Casamance, Senegal.

== History ==
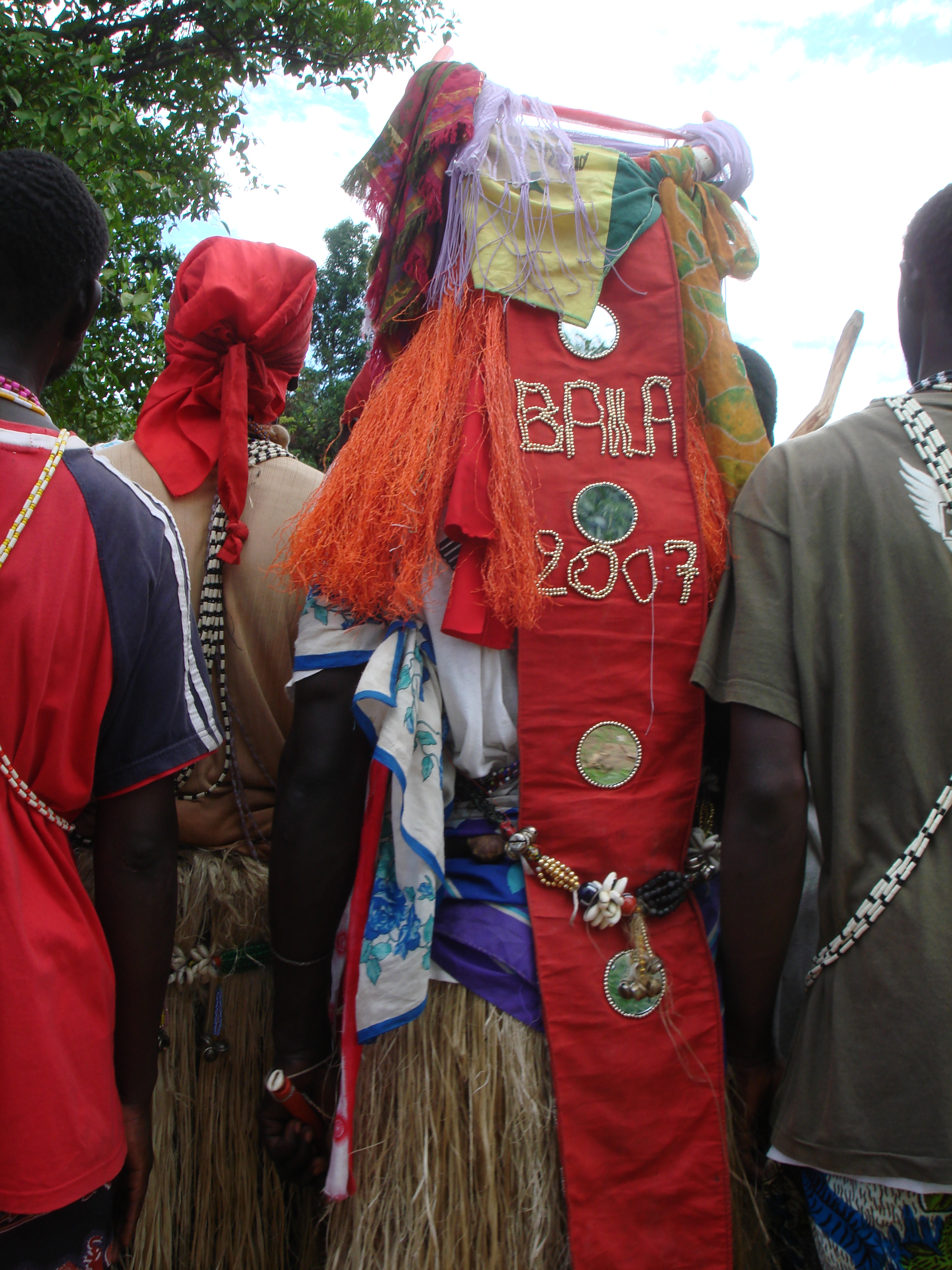
A participant in the boukout of 2007

Boukout, a Jola rite of passage, took place in Baïla for the first time in 1971, but it was 36 years before it was held there again. On August 4, 2007, thousands of people gathered for the occasion. In 2002, the French commune of Houdan committed to providing Baïla with humanitarian aid, both economically and culturally.

== Administration ==
Baïla is one of 16 villages in Suelle.

== Geography ==
The village is located approximately 45 km (28 mi) from Ziguinchor and 15 km (9.3 mi) from Bignona on the N5 road that leads to Banjul, The Gambia. The nearest towns are Tilaye, Belaye, Diakoye, Diatang, Kaparan, and Diegoun.

=== Population ===
According to PEPAM (Water and Sanitation Program for the Millennium), there are 1287 people and 179 households in Baïla. Most of the population is Jola, specifically Jola Fogny, a subgroup within the ethnicity. Pierre Goudiaby Atepa, an architect, was born in Baïla.

=== Flora ===
In Baïla, there is a kapok tree—a common name for fibre-producing trees of the Malvaceae family—considered sacred by the population, which is 14 centuries old.

== See also ==
=== Bibliography ===
- M. Diao (1982). "Le projet de mise en valeur de la vallée Baïla en Basse Casamance (Sénégal)". Enjeux fonciers en Afrique Noire (in French). IRD and Karthala.
- R. Galaire (1980). Etude hydrogéologique du marigot de Baïla (in French). Dakar: IRD. p. 104.
