= Soungrougrou River =

River in Senegal

Coordinates: 12°41′54″N 16°01′04″W

The Soungrougrou is a river of Senegal. It is a tributary of the Casamance River, and joins the river at Adéane. The river passes north from the Casamance, stretching to Vintang-Geregia. During the 19th century it was used by cotton traders, though the trading centres along the river were later abandoned. The river is inhabited by the Jola people, half of whom are Muslims. The small town of Marsassoum lies on the bank of the Soungrougrou.
