= United Nations Security Council Resolution 178 =

UN Security Council Resolution 178
- Date: April 24 1963
- Meeting no.: 1033
- Code: S/5293 (Document)
- Subject: Complaint by Senegal
- Voting summary: 11 voted for; None voted against; None abstained
- Result: Adopted

Security Council composition
- Permanent members: China; France; Soviet Union; United Kingdom; United States
- Non-permanent members: Brazil; Ghana; Morocco; Norway; Philippines; Venezuela

United Nations Security Council Resolution 178, adopted unanimously on April 24, 1963, after hearing of violations of Senegalese territory by Portuguese military forces from Portuguese Guinea, the Council deplored the incident at Bouniak as well as any incursion by the Portuguese and requested that they honor their declared intention to "scrupulously respect the sovereignty and territorial integrity of Senegal".

== See also ==
- List of United Nations Security Council Resolutions 101 to 200 (1953–1965)
- Portuguese Colonial War
