= Bandial =

- Village
- Location within Senegal
- Coordinates: 12°34′51″N 16°28′59″W
- Country: Senegal
- Region: Ziguinchor Region
- Department: Ziguinchor Department
- Arrondissement: Nyassia Arrondissement
- Commune: Enampore

Population (2003)
  - Total: 229
- Time zone: UTC+0 (GMT)

Bandial is a village in the commune of Enampore, Nyassia Arrondissement, Ziguinchor Department in the Ziguinchor Region of Senegal. According to PEPAM (Programme d'eau potable et d'assainissement du Millénaire), Bandial has a population of 229 people living in 32 houses.

Bandial is known for its houses with impluvia, and for being the center of a small pre-colonial state known as the Kingdom of Bandial or Mof Ëwi.
