= Niaguis Arrondissement =

- Arrondissement
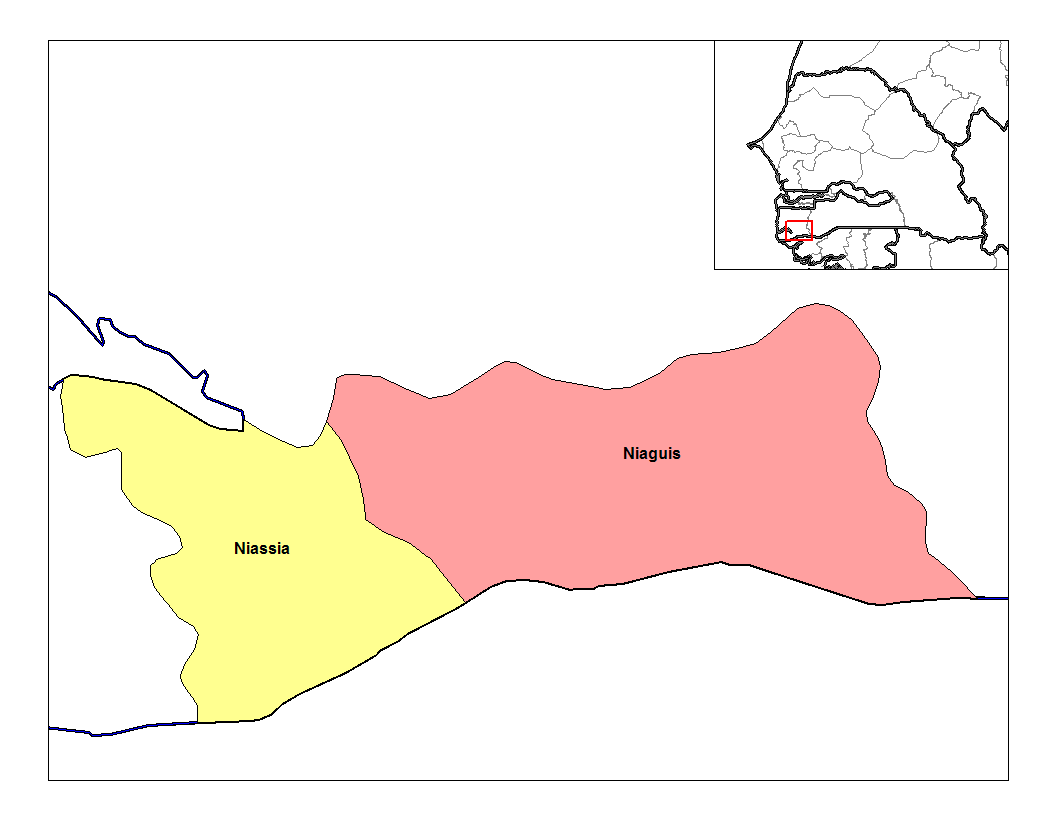
- Location in the Ziguinchor Department

- Location within Senegal
- Coordinates: 12°34′12″N 16°09′51″W
- Country: Senegal
- Region: Ziguinchor Region
- Department: Ziguinchor Department

Area
  - Total: 692 km^{2} (267 sq mi)

Population (2013 census)
  - Total: 33,230
  - Density: 48.0/km^{2} (124/sq mi)
- Time zone: UTC±00:00 (GMT)

Niaguis Arrondissement is an arrondissement of the Ziguinchor Department in the Ziguinchor Region of Senegal.

== Subdivisions ==
The arrondissement is divided administratively into 3 rural communities (communautés rurales) and in turn into villages.

Communautés rurales :

Adéane CR	Niaguis CR	Boutoupa CR
9 villages: Adéane; Agnack Grand; Agnack Petit; Baghagha; Bissine; Diagnon; Koundioundou; Sindone; Tambacoumba	13 villages: Baraf; Boucotte Mancagne; Boulome; Boutoute; Djibélor; Djifanghor; Fanda; Gouraf; Mandina Mancagne; Mandina Manjaque; Niaguis; Sône; Soucouta	24 villages: Baraka Bounao; Baraka Pakao; Baraka Patata; Bidour ?; Bilasse; Bindialoum Bainounk; Bindialoum Manjacque; Boffa; Bourofaye Bainounk; Bourofaye Diola; Boussoloum; Boutoupa; Camaracounda; Guidel Bambadinka; Laty; Mawa; Mpack; Niabina, Senegal; Niadiou; Niaféna; Poubosse; Pouboul ?; Samick; Sandiaba Manjacque; Tampe ?; Tendaba; Yabone
