= Boukout =

Rite of passage among the Jola ethnic group

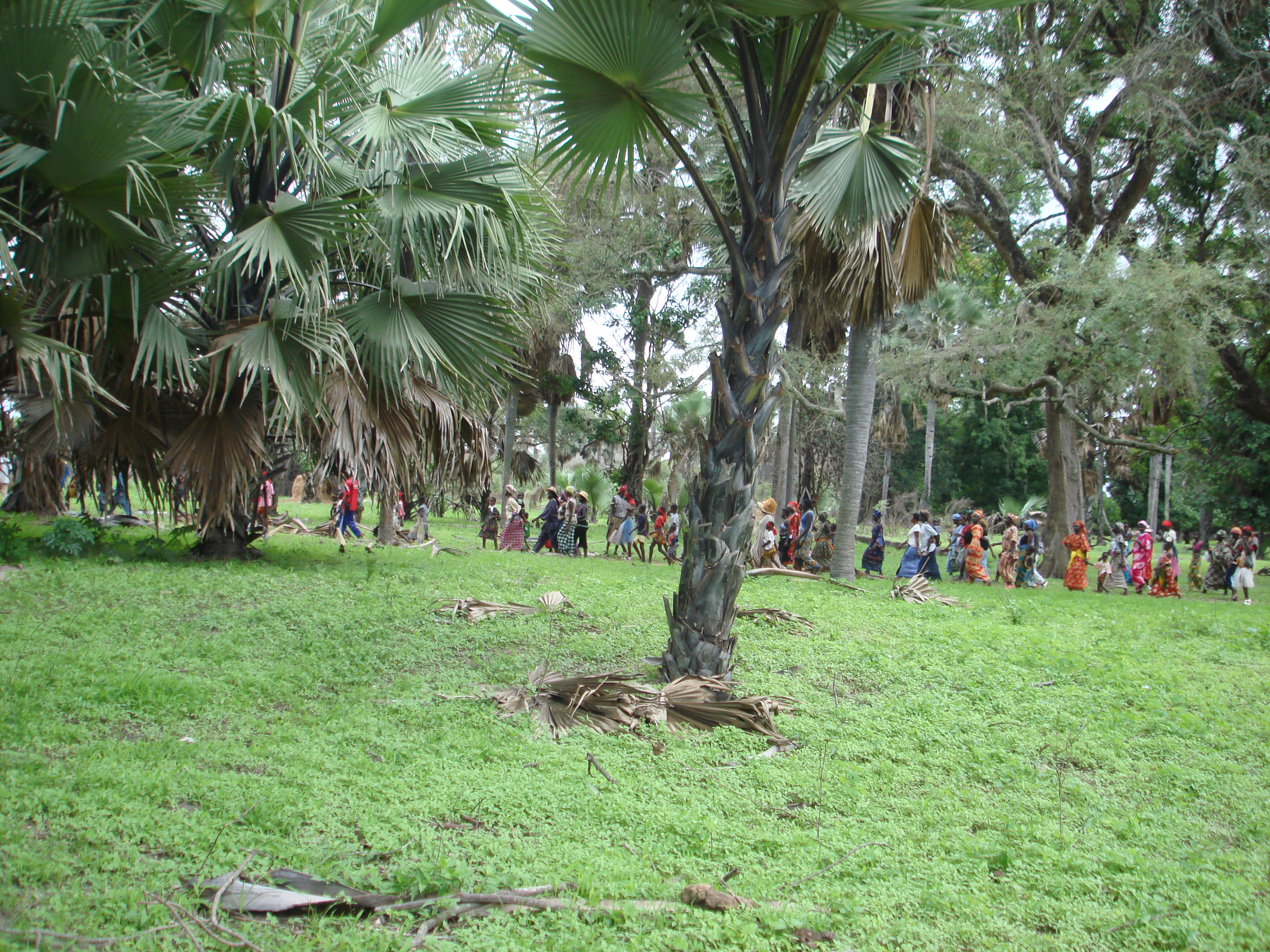
The crowd converging in Baïla

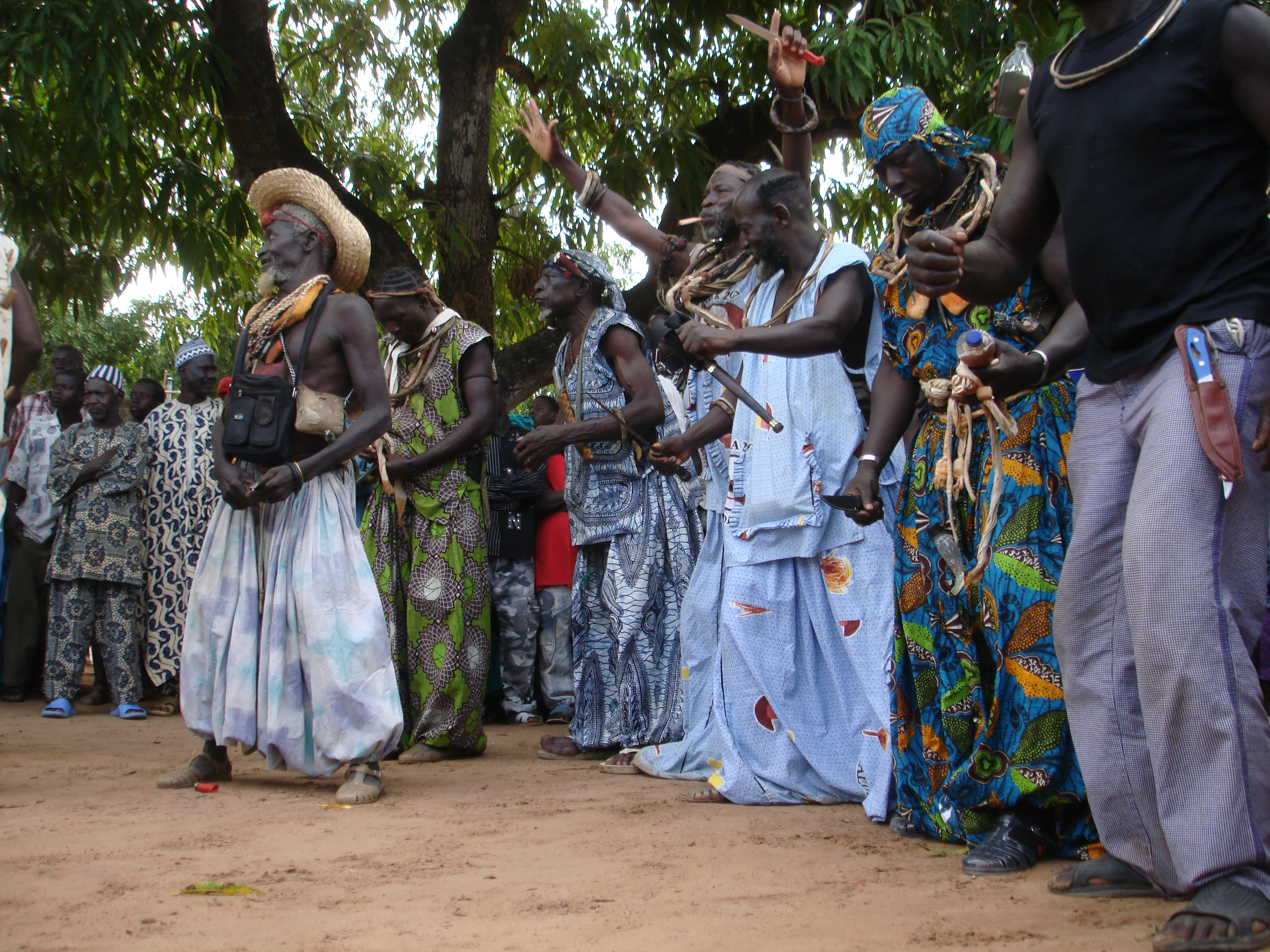
Demonstration of the bravery of the elders

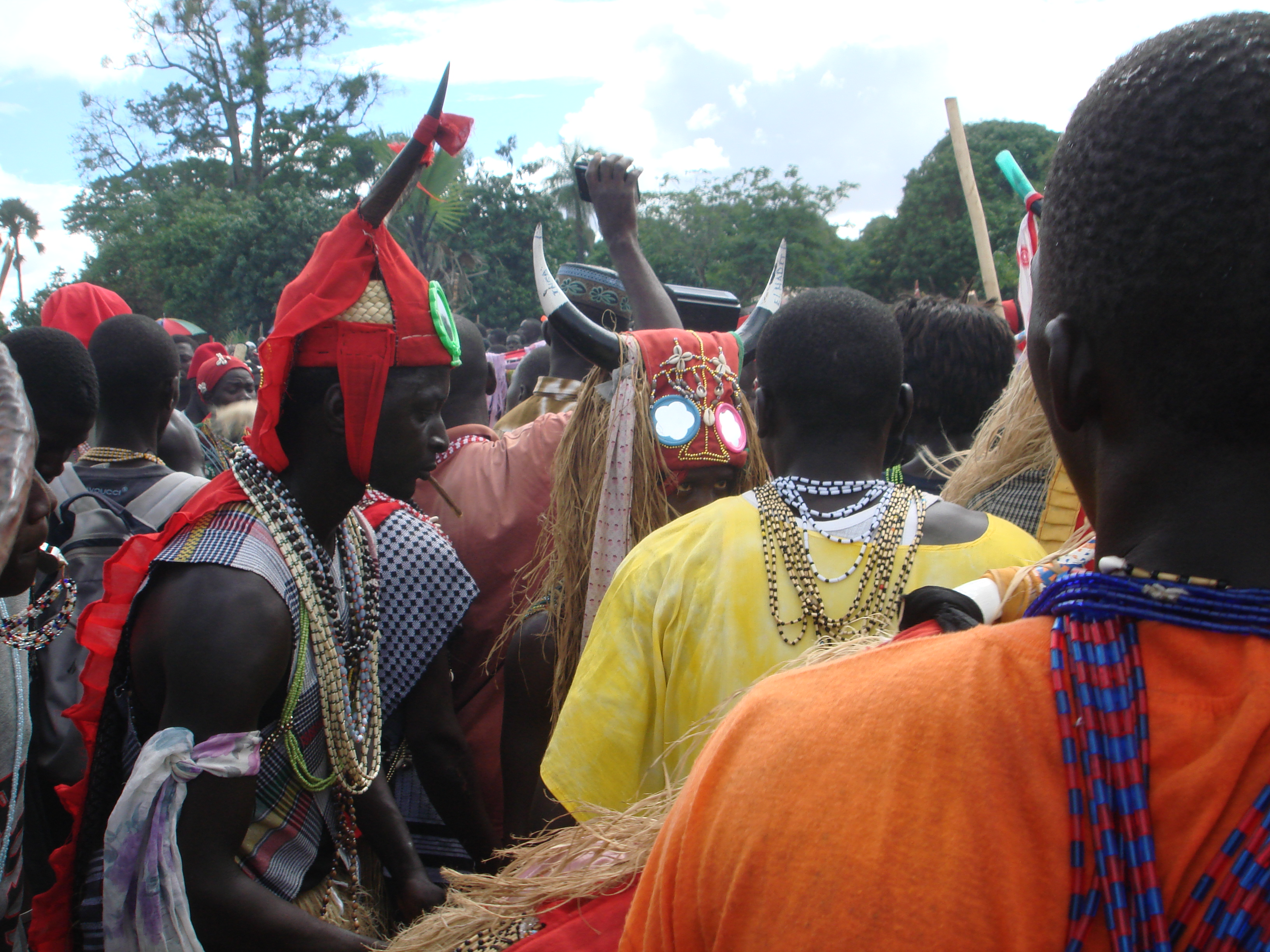
Multicoloured ritual masks and necklaces

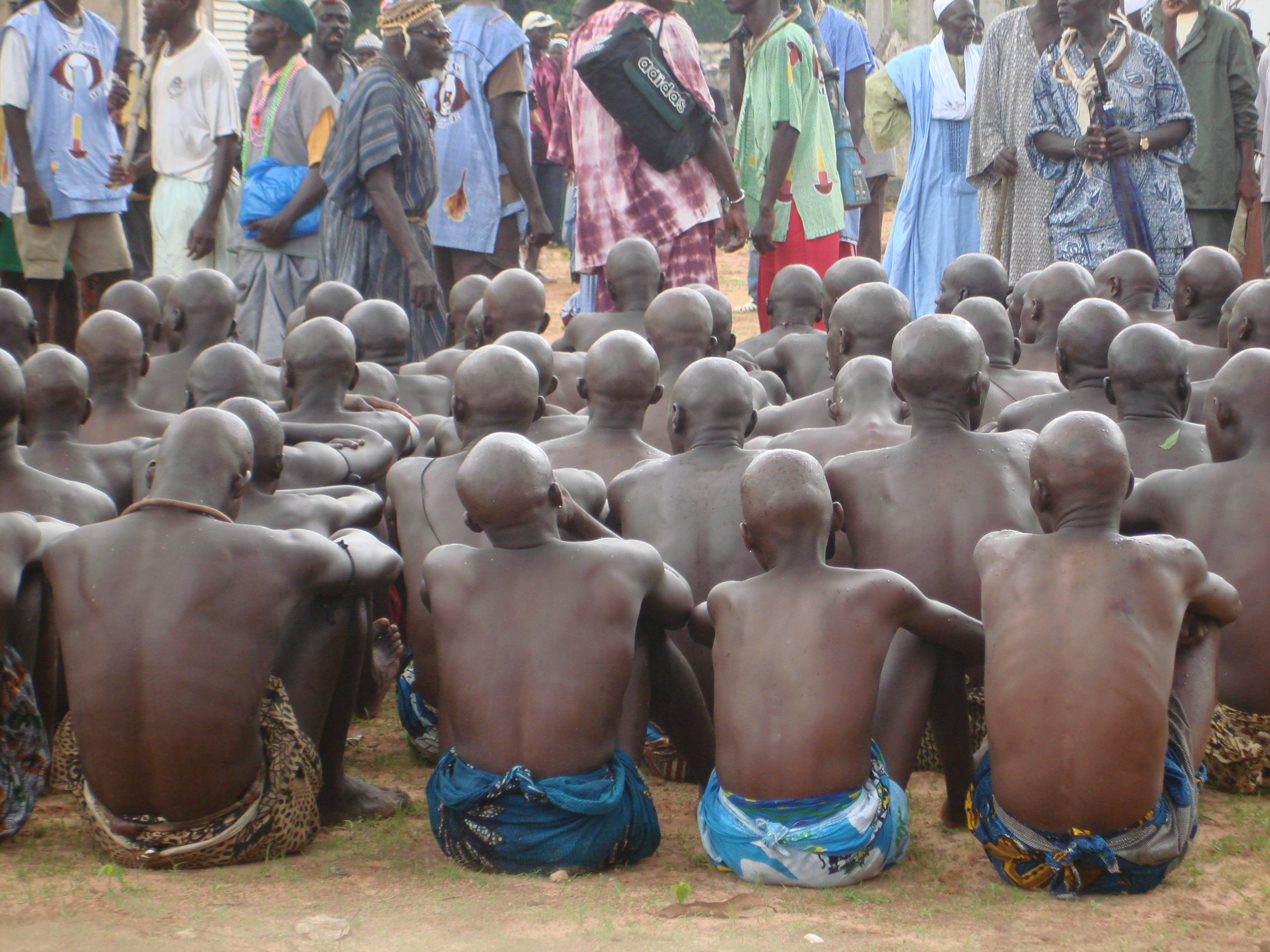
Future initiates after shaving

Boukout (also called bukut or futampaf) is a Jola rite of passage practised in Ziguinchor, Senegal.

== Origin ==
There is evidence that this ritual has existed at least since the 12th century. Before the colonization, boukout was the only method of formal education in the area, preparing young men to take their place in society as well as teaching them how to defend it.

== Issues ==
Organized by the elders who hold power over the other villagers and control all means of production, the ceremony provides initiates with political, economic, and religious independence. Until they have partaken in boukout, young people may not marry or receive land, and are somewhat excluded from the community. The uninitiated are not considered men, as boukout is seen to bestow masculinity.

== Ceremony ==
The period between ceremonies can be lengthy, often lasting twenty years. When the ceremony took place in Baïla in August 2007, it had been 36 years since boukout had been performed. It is never known precisely when boukout will take place, although the event is announced by the elders two or three years before the fact, after having discovered a series of phenomena that constitute the necessary signs.

Preparations for boukout last several days, as future initiates, relatives, and residents of nearby villages gather in large numbers in the village. Members of the diaspora also take part, so that hundreds or even thousands of people are present. The event is accompanied by masked dances and various demonstrations of bravery. Finally, the heads of future inititiates are shaved.

The actual initiation takes place in private in a sacred wood. At one time, this secluded initiation period lasted several months, but the time has since been shortened significantly.

== Known dates ==
- 1972 – Seleki
- 2007 – Baïla
- 2009 – Dianki
- 2009 – Kabrousse

== See also ==
- Culture of Senegal
- Ndut

== Bibliography ==
- Peter Mark (Spring 1988). "Ejumba: The Iconography of the Diola Initiation Mask". Art Journal. Object and Intellect: Interpretations of Meaning in African Art. 47 (2): 139–146. doi:10.2307/777067. JSTOR 777067.
- Peter Mark; Ferdinand de Jong; Clémence Chupin (Winter 1998). "Ritual and Masking Traditions in Jola Men's Initiation". African Arts. 31 (1): 36–47, 94–96. doi:10.2307/3337622. JSTOR 3337622.
- Peter Mark; Mark, Peter (April 1993). "The Wild Bull and the Sacred Forest. Form, Meaning, and Change in Senegambian Initiation Masks". African Arts. 26 (2): 22, 25–26, 28–30. doi:10.2307/3337128. JSTOR 3337128.
- Jean Girard (1969). Genèse du pouvoir charismatique en Basse-Casamance, Sénégal (in French). Dakar: IFAN. p. 364.
- Louis-Vincent Thomas (October 1965). "Bukut chez les Diola-Niomoun". Notes Africaines (in French) (108). Dakar: IFAN: 97–119.
- Louis-Vincent Thomas (1958). Les Diola. Essai d’analyse fonctionnelle sur une population de basse-Casamance (in French). Dakar: IFAN. p. 821.

== Filmography ==
- (in French) Tigguy (Guy Garçon), L’appel du Bukut, 52’
