= Adéane =

- Rural Community and town
- Location in Senegal
- Coordinates: 12°37′40″N 16°0′55″W
- Country: Senegal
- Region: Ziguinchor
- Department: Ziguinchor
- Arrondissement: Niaguis

Population (2002)
  - Total: 2,115
- Time zone: UTC+0 (GMT)

Adéane is a small town and rural community in Senegal. It has a population of 2115 people according to the 2002 census. It lies on the southern bank of the Casamance River, opposite where the Soungrougrou River joins the Casamance, close to the Bissine Forest. It lies along the N6 highway, connecting it to Ziguinchor and Kolda.

== Geography ==
=== Villages ===
Villages in the Adéane rural community comprise

- Adéane
- Agnack Grand
- Agnack Petit
- Baghagha
- Bissine
- Diagnon
- Koundioundou
- Sindone
- Tambacoumba
