= Badiatte =

Coordinates: 12°31′05″N 16°23′07″W

- Interactive map of Badiatte
- Country: Senegal
- Time zone: UTC+0 (GMT)

Badiatte is a settlement in Senegal.
