= Batimin =

Coordinates: 12.5461°N 16.4082°W

- Interactive map of Batimin
- Country: Senegal
- Time zone: UTC+0 (GMT)

Batimin is a settlement in Senegal.
