= Mpack, Senegal =

Mpack
- Town
- Location within Senegal
- Coordinates: 12°27′43″N 16°14′17″W
- Country: Senegal
- Region: Ziguinchor Region
- Department: Ziguinchor
- Arrondissement: Niaguis
- Time zone: UTC+0 (GMT)

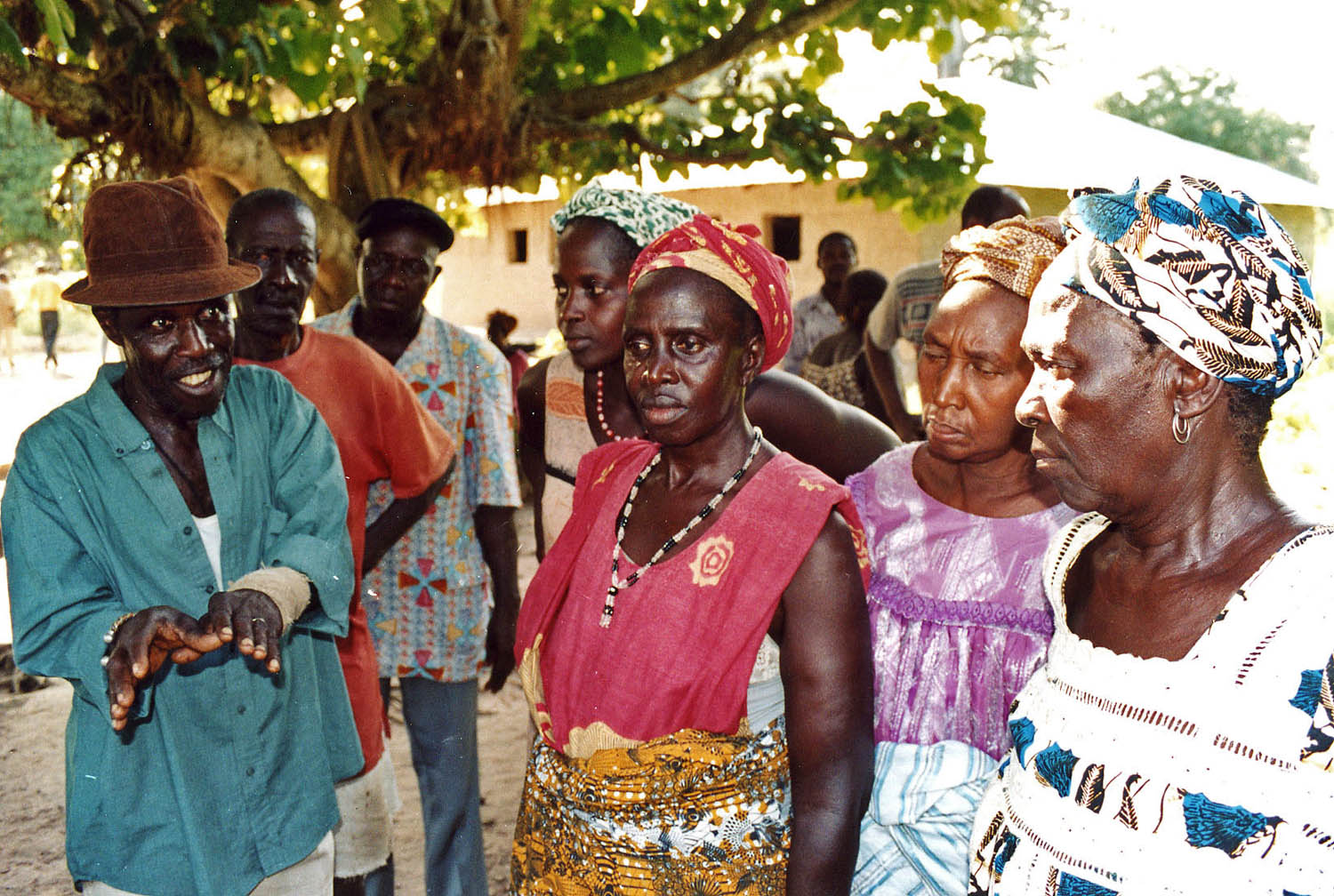
People of Mpack

Mpack (also spelt Mpak) is a village in Niaguis Arrondissement, Ziguinchor Department, Ziguinchor Region in southern Senegal. Government statistics classified it as a rural community and recorded its population as 518 people in 72 households. It is located about seven kilometres from the regional capital of Ziguinchor. It is one of the endpoints of the 90-km long Oussouye-Kabrousse-Cap Skirring-Ziguinchor-Mpack road, which is being rebuilt with 17 billion CFA francs of funding from the European Union. The village used to be on the front lines of the Casamance Conflict between the Senegalese government and the Movement of Democratic Forces of Casamance.

The town contains the only border checkpoint between Senegal and Guinea-Bissau with an asphalt road; its counterpart on the Guinea-Bissau side is Sao Domingos. During the 1998 Guinea-Bissau Civil War, up to 100 refugees an hour passed through the checkpoint and the village as they fled the fighting. Later, as the Casamance Conflict intensified, the checkpoint was frequently closed, as MDFC members were believed to be taking refuge in Guinea-Bissau. The area was also heavily mined during the fighting; local NGOs made efforts to clear the mines in 2002 and 2003, rehabilitating over 100 houses in the village and its surrounding area, following which the Senegalese military declared the area safe; however, casualties due to exploding mines continued to occur in 2004. A camp was set up in the Bourgadié neighbourhood there in March 2006 to receive Senegalese refugees fleeing Guinea-Bissau after the October 2004 army mutiny left the country in disarray.
