= Bafican =

Coordinates: 12°28′14″N 16°24′15″W

- Interactive map of Bafican
- Country: Senegal
- Time zone: UTC+0 (GMT)

Bafican is a settlement in Senegal.
