= Bouhouyou =

Coordinates: 12°27′N 16°15′W

- Interactive map of Bouhouyou
- Country: Senegal
- Time zone: UTC+0 (GMT)

Bouhouyou is a settlement in Senegal.
