= Bamole =

- Country: Senegal
- Time zone: UTC+0 (GMT)

Bamole is a settlement in Senegal.
