= Boffa Boyote =

- Interactive map of Boffa Boyote
- Country: Senegal
- Time zone: UTC+0 (GMT)

Boffa Boyote is a settlement in Senegal.
