= Nyassia =

Niassia Nyassia
- Village
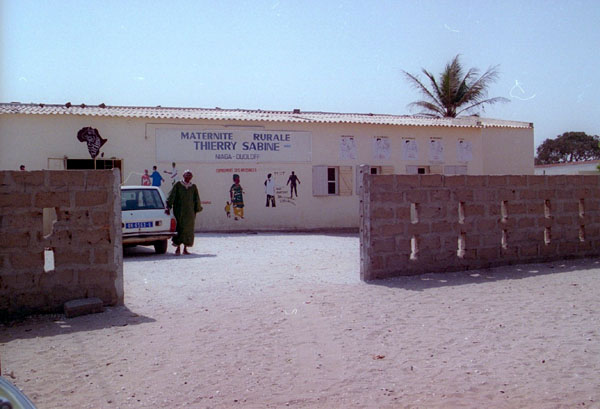

- Location within Senegal
- Coordinates: 12°28′14″N 16°22′58″W
- Country: Senegal
- Region: Ziguinchor
- Department: Ziguinchor

Niassia (also spelled Nyassia) is a village and commune in Ziguinchor Department, Ziguinchor Region, Casamance, Senegal.

== Administration ==
Niassia is the capital of the rural community of Niassia and Niassia district. The commune contains villages such as Badème, Bassere, Bougnack, Kadiene, Goudoume, Atoure, Toubacouta, Babonda, Djililo and Bagame. The current president of the Nyassia Rural Community (as of January 2013) is Parfait Sagna.

== Geography ==
The nearest towns are Bafikane, Badionkoton, Katio, Etome, and Kailou.
