= Enampore =

Village in Senegal

Coordinates: 12°30′42″N 16°26′56″W

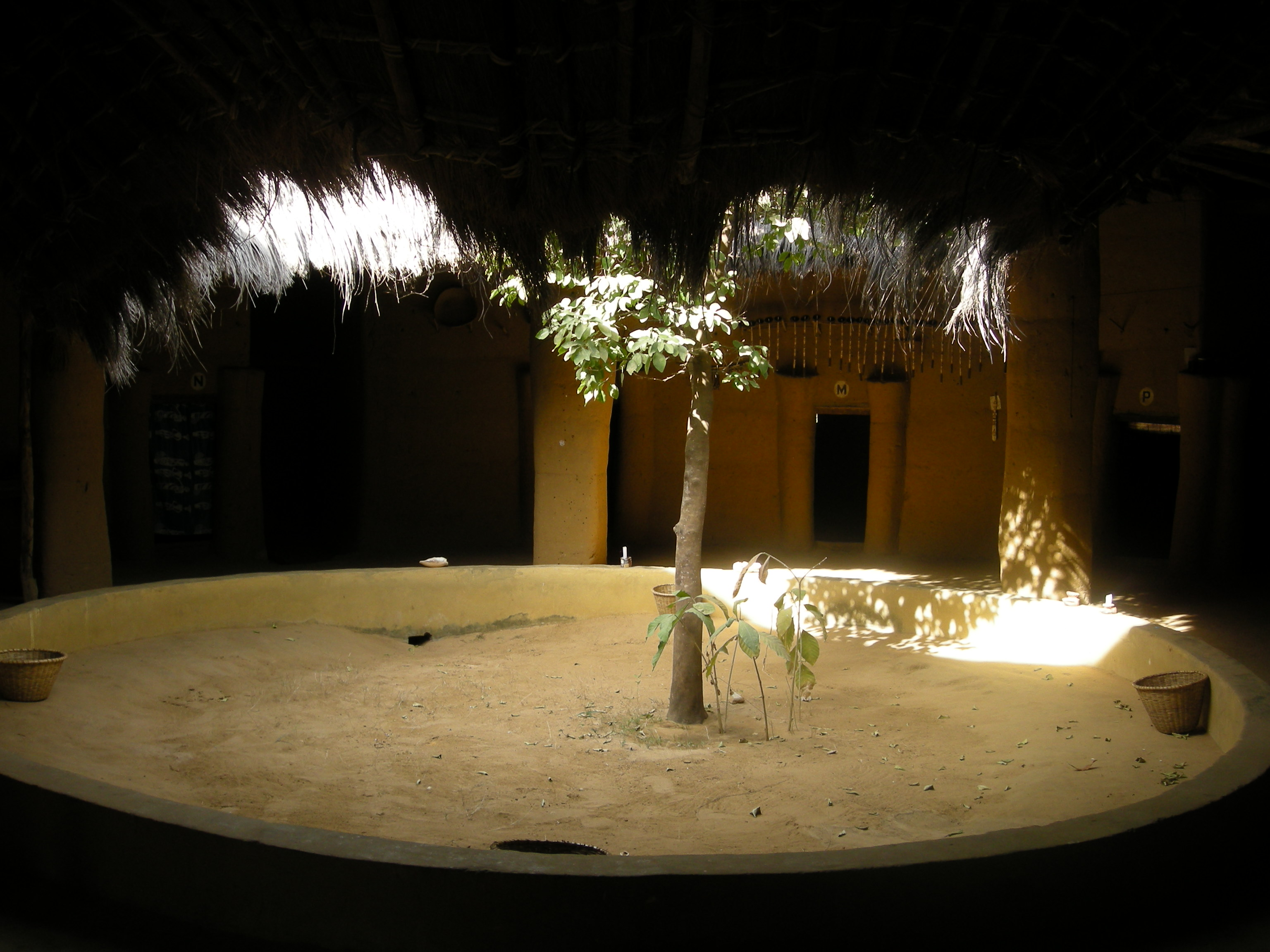
Enampore.

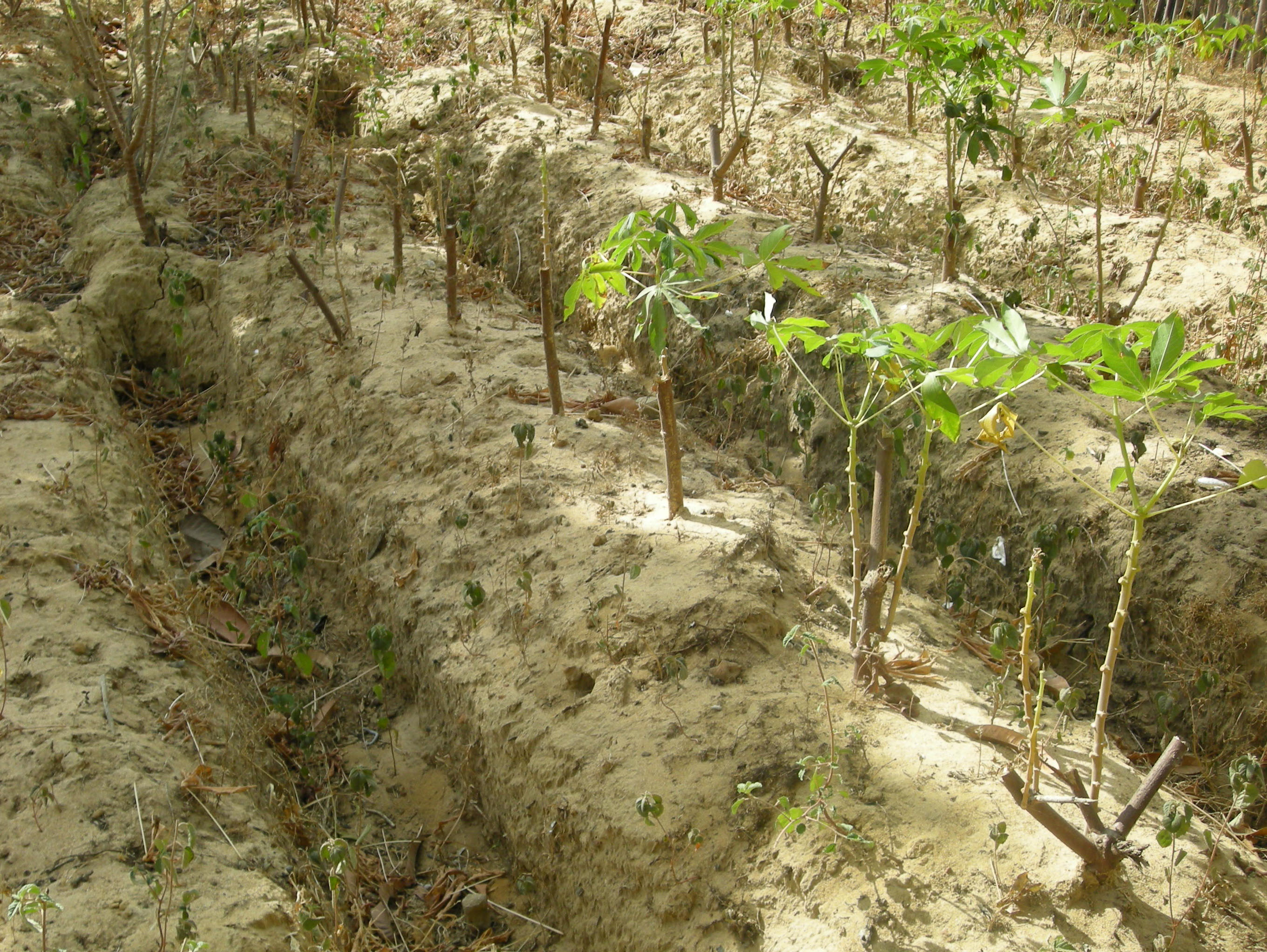
Enampore.

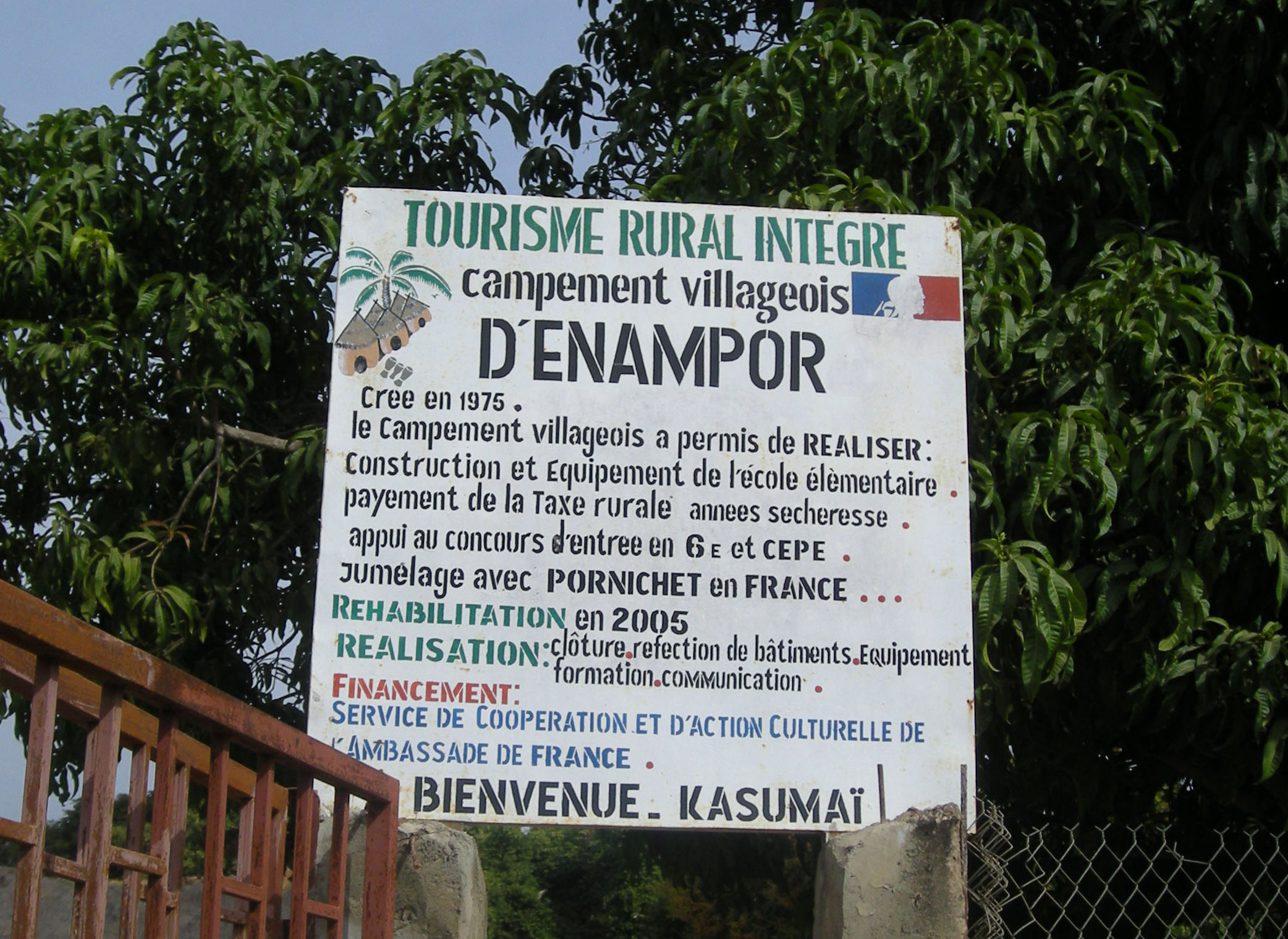
Enampore.

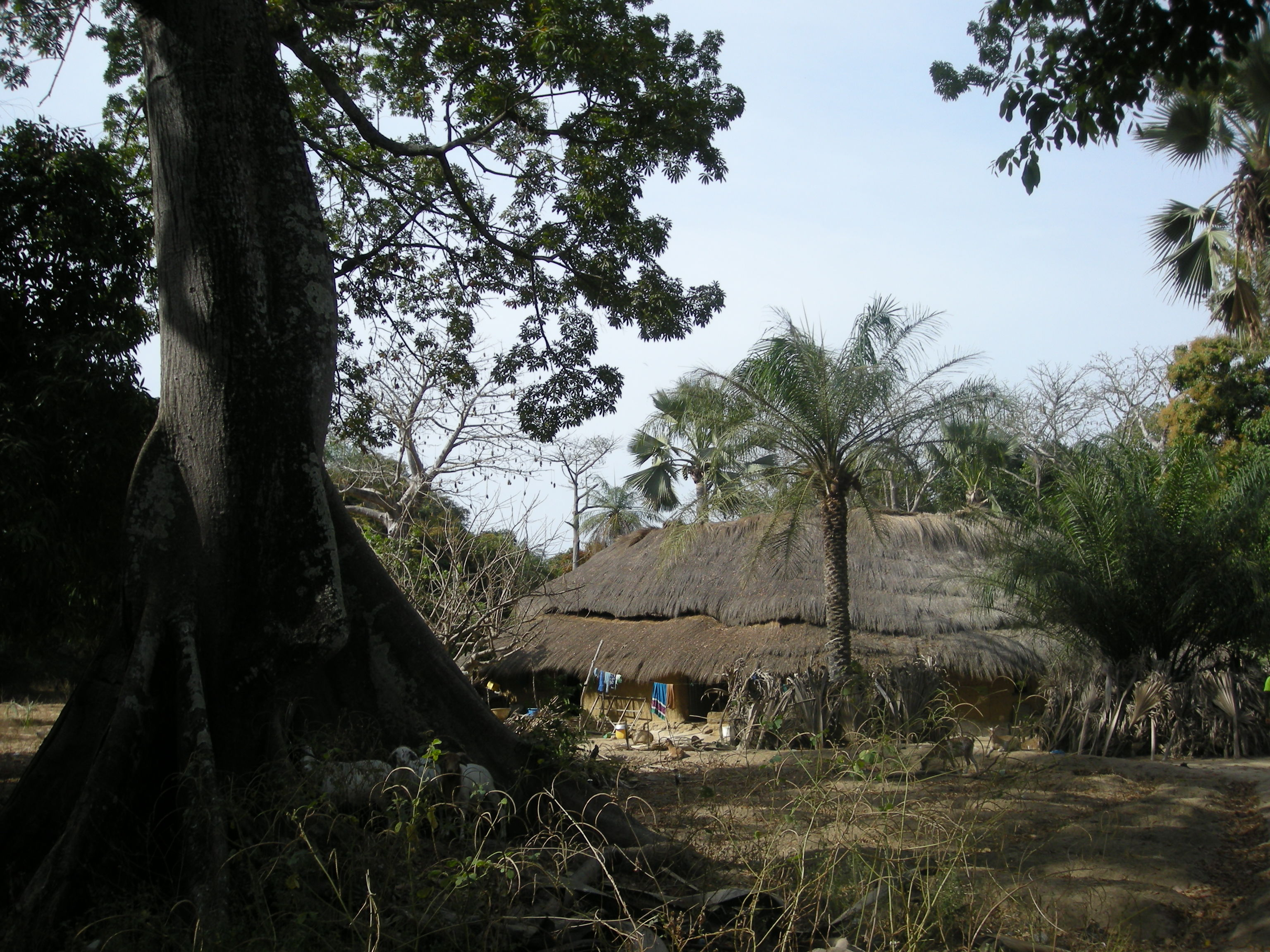
Enampore.

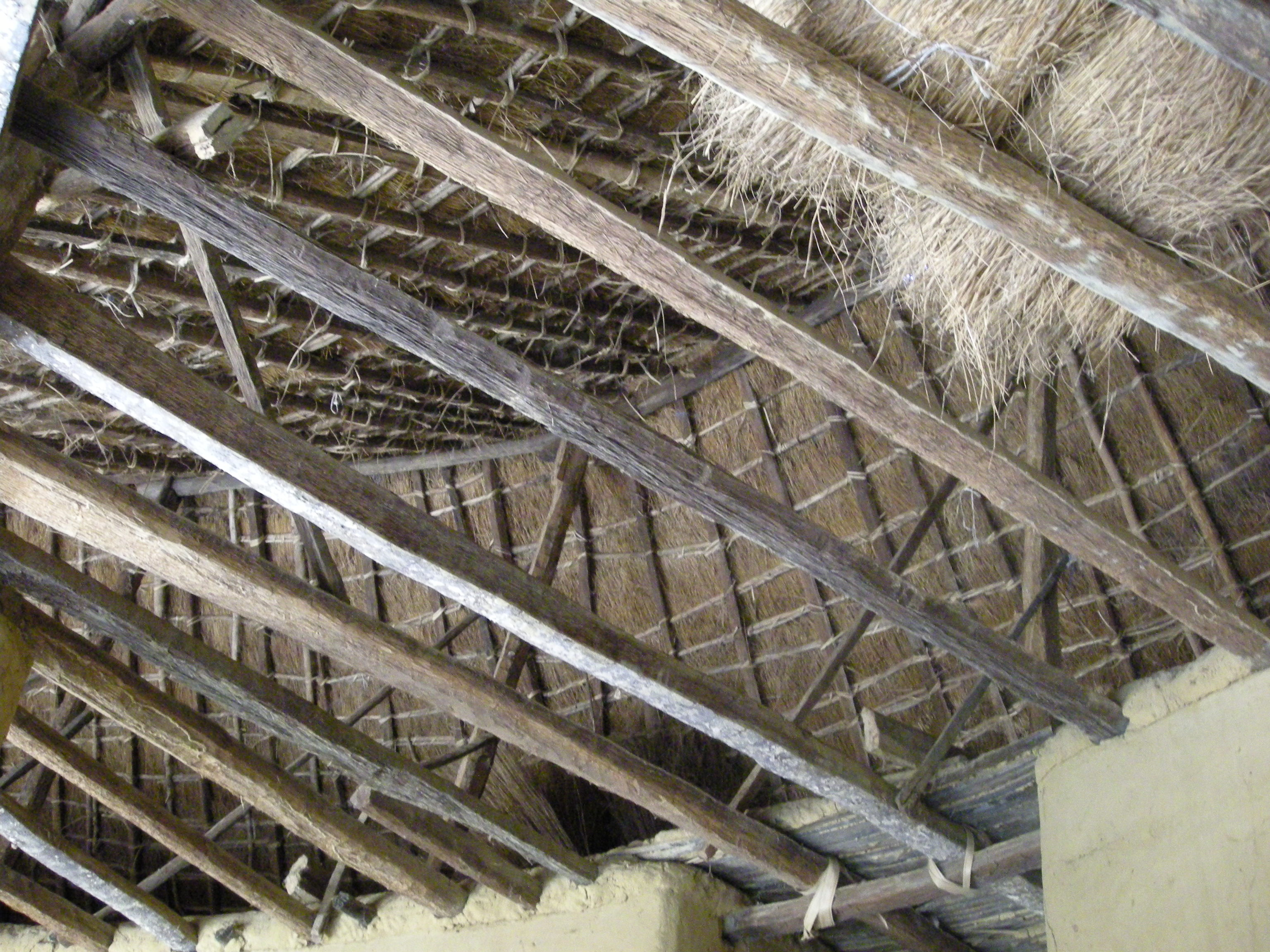
Enampore.

Enampore is a village in the Casamance region of Senegal. It lies about 23 kilometres from the Casamance's chief town Ziguinchor. It is noted for its impluvium houses, which are a distinctive feature of Jola architecture.
