= Ziguinchor department =

Coordinates: 12°33′43″N 16°17′02″W

Ziguinchor
- Department
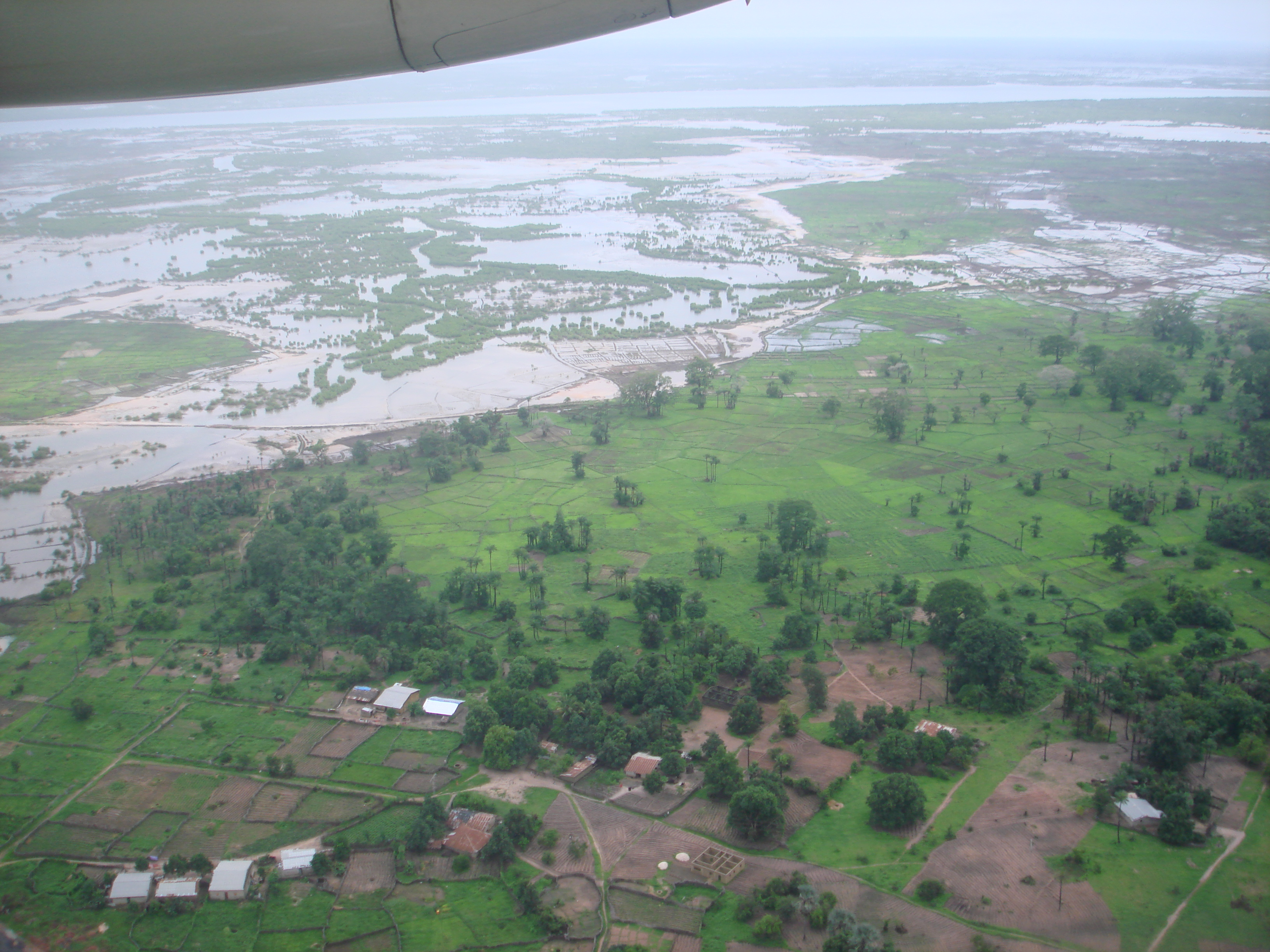

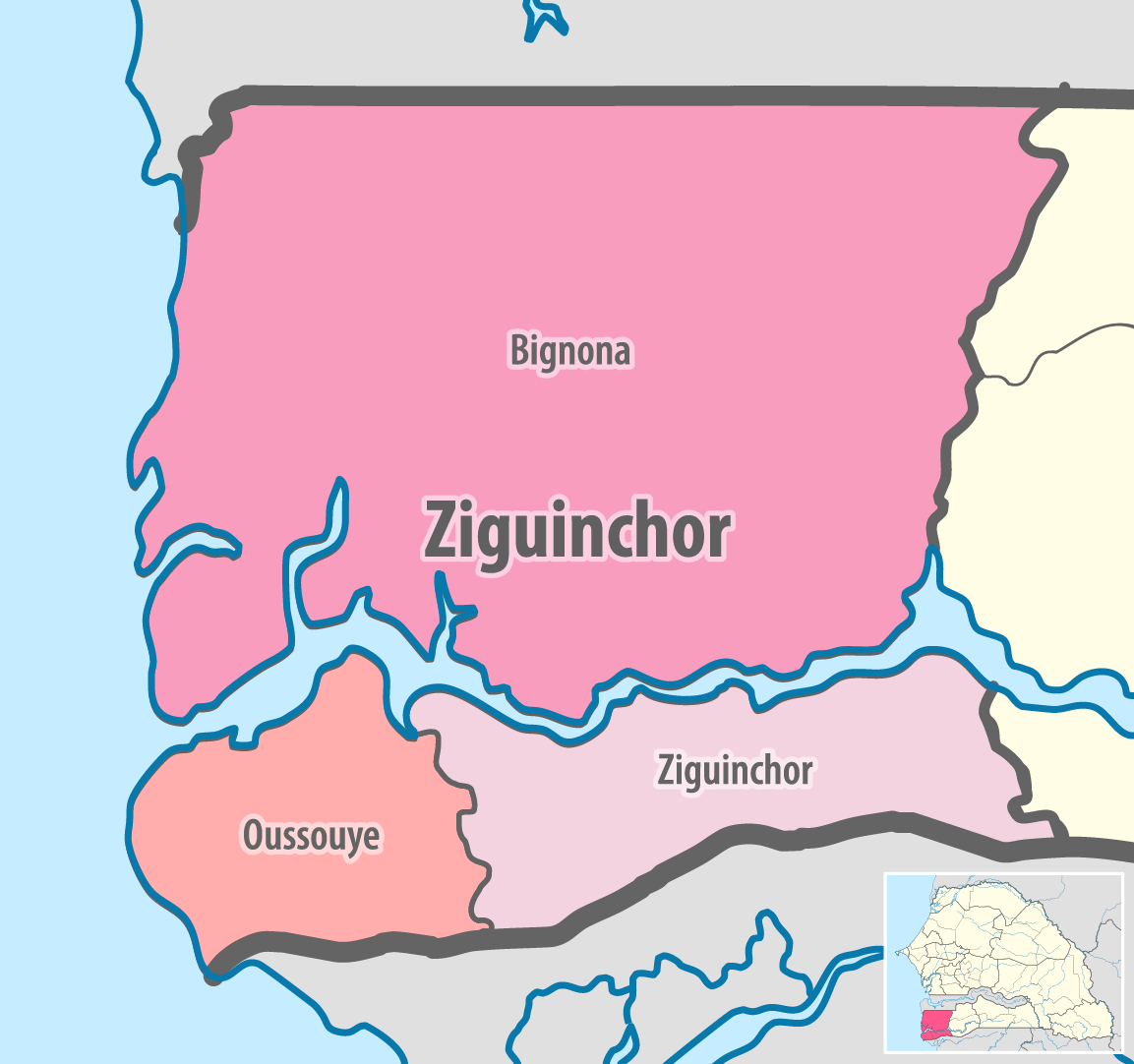
- Location in the Ziguinchor region
- Country: Senegal
- Region: Ziguinchor region
- Capital: Ziguinchor

Area
  - Total: 1,153 km^{2} (445 sq mi)

Population (2023 census)
  - Total: 274,563
  - Density: 238.1/km^{2} (616.8/sq mi)
- Time zone: UTC+0 (GMT)

Ziguinchor department is one of the 46 departments of Senegal, one of three located in the Ziguinchor region in the south-west of the country.

The department has a single urban commune, that of Ziguinchor.

The department is also divided administratively into two arrondissements, Niaguis Arrondissement and Nyassia Arrondissement which are in turn split into rural communities (Communautés rurales).

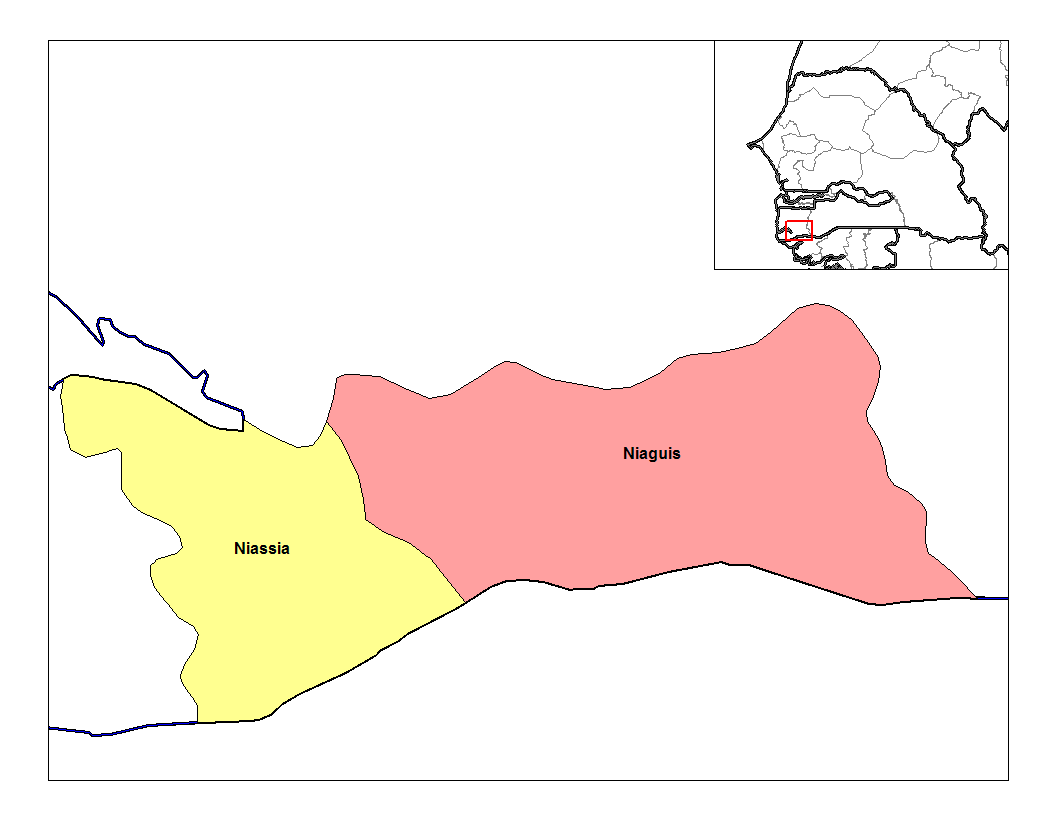
Ziguinchor Department arrondissements

- Niaguis Arrondissement:
  - Adéane
  - Niaguis
  - Boutoupa-Camaracounda
- Nyassia Arrondissement:
  - Enampore
  - Nyassia

== Historic sites ==
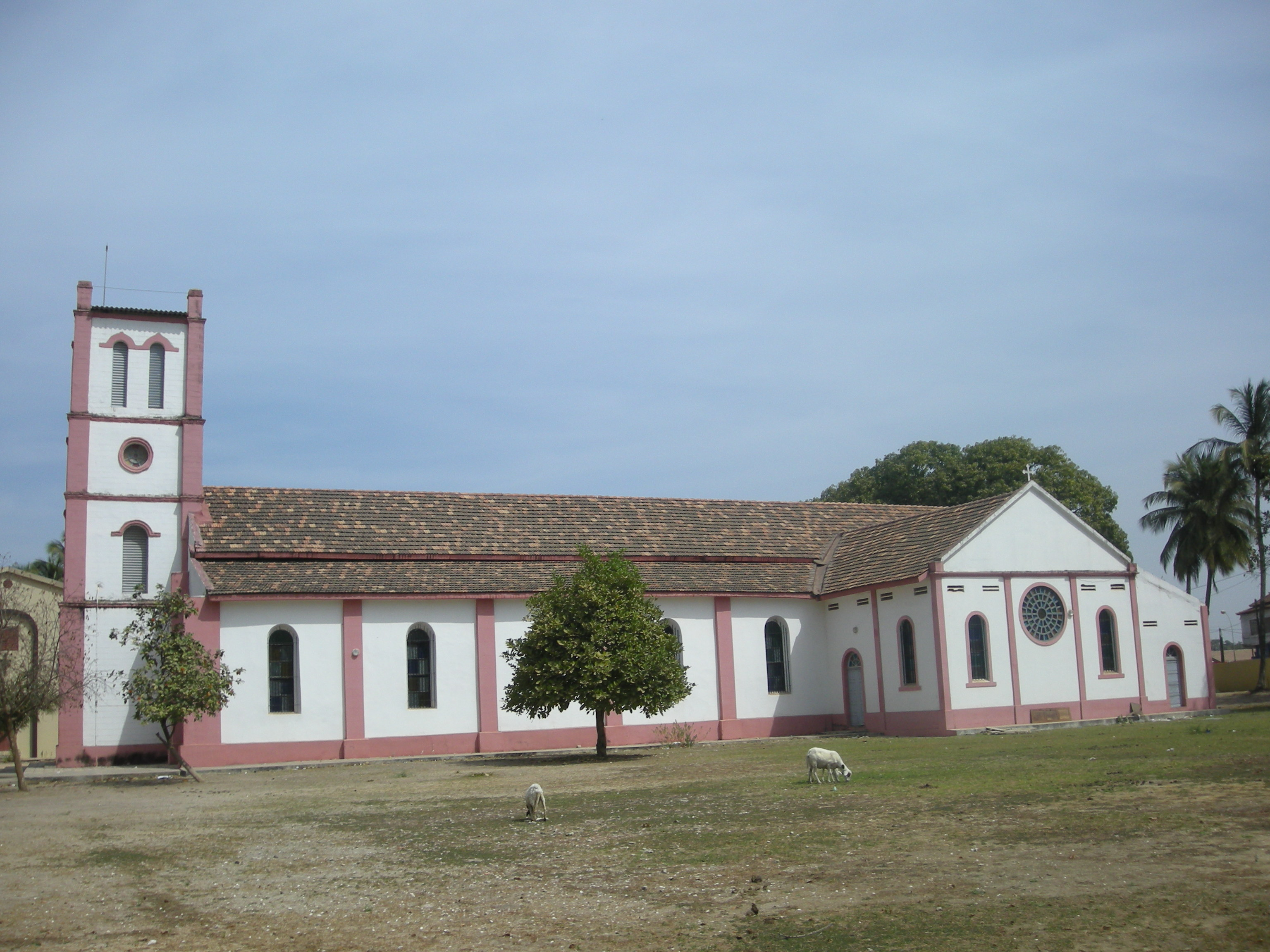
Saint-Antoine de Padoue Cathedral

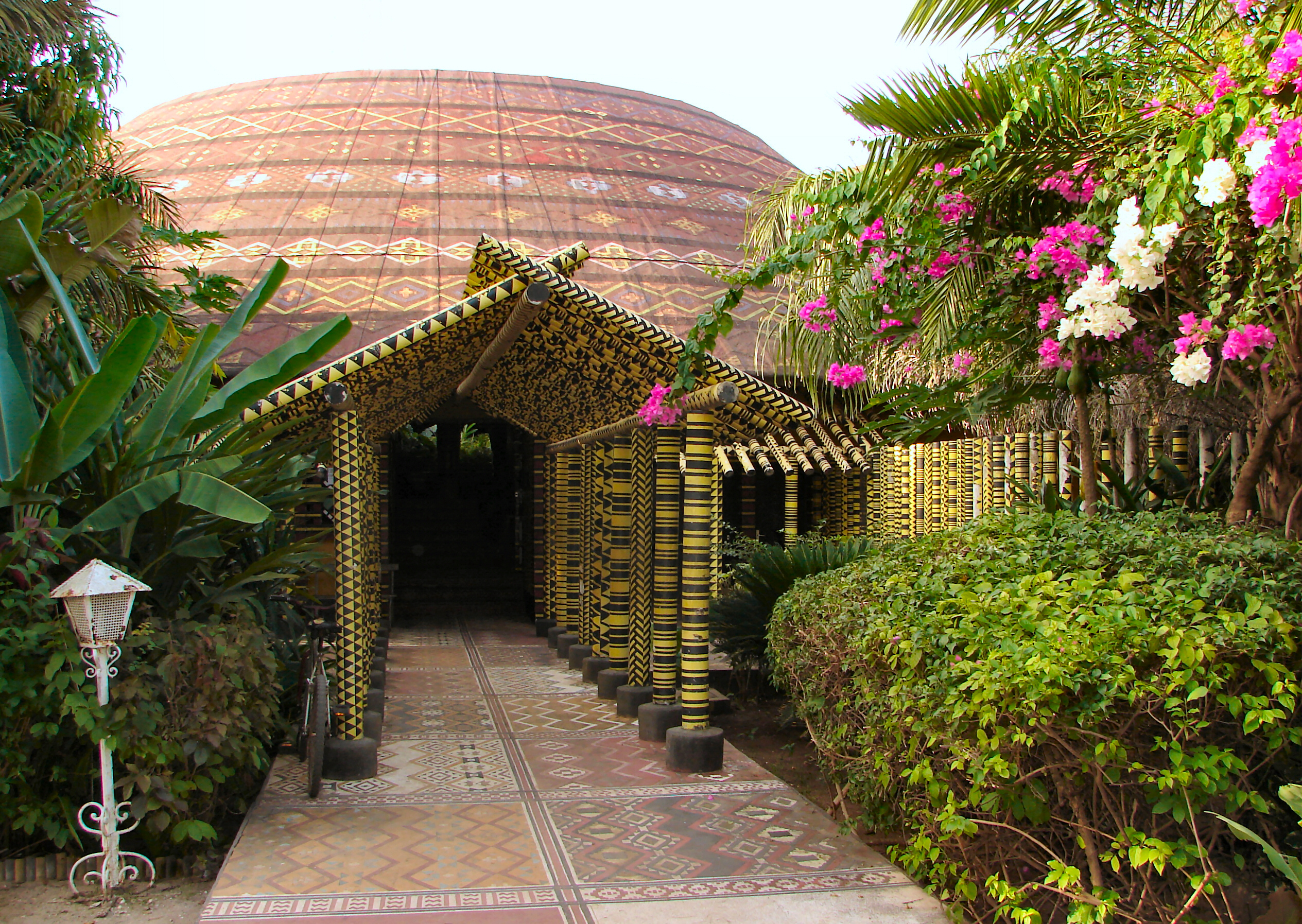
Impluvium house in Ziguinchor

- Saint-Antoine de Padoue Cathedral, Ziguinchor
- Palais de Justice, Ziguinchor
- Government building, Ziguinchor
- Regional council building, Ziguinchor
- Baobab tree at Boutoupa, Niaguis Arrondissement. (200 years old, a place of worship for women where men were forbidden)
- Grand Mosque of Santhiaba, Ziguinchor
- Cemetery (mixed Islamic and Christian), Route du Sud, Ziguinchor
- Dialang Bantang fromager tree at Niéfoulène Ziguinchor, place of worship for Diola and Mandingo women, Ziguinchor
- Impluvium houses of the Kingdom of Bandial
