= Politics of Senegal =

Politics in Senegal takes place within a presidential democratic republic. The President of Senegal serves as the head of state and the head of government, with concentrated executive power.

While legislative power is technically vested in both the government and the parliament, the parliament rarely introduces legislation or rejects government-proposed legislation. Similarly, although the Judiciary is theoretically independent of the executive and the legislature, the executive branch seems to exert undue control over the judiciary.

Since independence, Senegal has oscillated between democracy and competitive authoritarianism. Senegal is one of the few African states that has never experienced a coup d'état or exceptionally harsh authoritarianism. Léopold Senghor, the first president after independence, resigned in 1981 and handed the presidency to his Prime Minister, Abdou Diouf.

Senegal became democratic around 2000, although political repression, attempts to overstay in power, and delays in parliamentary elections have occurred. The Economist Intelligence Unit rated Senegal a "hybrid regime" in 2022. Democratic backsliding occurred during Macky Sall's second term in office. The current president, Bassirou Diomaye Faye, was elected in democratic elections in March 2024, after a turbulent election cycle in which incumbent president Macky Sall tried to postpone the election.

== Introduction ==
=== Political system ===
The President is elected by universal adult suffrage to a 5-year term (previously, a 7-year term). The unicameral National Assembly has 150 members, who are elected separately from the President. The Socialist Party dominated the National Assembly until April 2001, when, in free and fair legislative elections, President Wade's coalition won a majority (90 of 150 seats).

The Cour Suprême (Highest Appeals Court, equivalent to the U.S. Supreme Court) and the Constitutional Council, the justices of which are named by the President, are the nation's highest tribunals. Senegal is divided into 11 administrative regions, each headed by a governor appointed by and responsible to the President. The law on decentralisation, which took effect in January 1998, transferred significant central government authority to regional assemblies.

=== Political culture ===
The Socialist Party (PS) was the main political party for 40 years. Its dominance ended in March 2000, when Abdoulaye Wade, the leader of the Senegalese Democratic Party (PDS) and opposition leader for over 25 years, won the presidency. Under a 2016 amendment to the 2001 constitution, future presidents will serve for 5 years and be limited to two terms. Sall was the last president elected to a 7-year term.

President Wade advanced a liberal agenda for Senegal, including privatisation and other market-oriented reforms. Nevertheless, Senegal has limited means to implement ambitious ideas. Economic liberalisation is continuing at a slow pace. Senegal continues to play a significant role in regional and international organisations. President Wade has prioritised cordial relations with the United States.

Currently, about 72 political parties exist, most of which are marginal and serve as platforms for their leaders. The principal political parties constitute a multiparty, democratic culture and have contributed to the country's democratic transition. An independent media, largely free from official or informal control, also contributes to Senegal's democratic politics.

Wade's image as a constitutional democrat was tarnished towards the end of his mandate. When faced with internal dissent within his own party, his main opponent, Idrissa Seck, was arrested and accused of treason. Wade refused to hold presidential elections in 2006, arguing that there were economic reasons to hold the presidential and parliamentary elections simultaneously in 2007.

Initially, Wade's government had support from a broad range of groups opposed to the socialist government, but individual parties gradually distanced themselves and joined the opposition socialist party. In 2011, Wade attempted to amend the Constitution to allow him to run for another term. Opponents then protested throughout the Summer of 2011, while government supporters staged counter-protests. The crisis has deepened political rifts within the country, which has long been a rare example of stability in the region. After Senegal's Constitutional Court approved Wade's bid to run for a third presidential term, street protests broke out.

In March 2012, incumbent Wade lost the presidential election to Sall. In August 2017, the ruling coalition won a landslide victory in the parliamentary elections, securing 125 seats in the 165-seat National Assembly. In 2019, Sall was re-elected in the first round. In March 2024, Opposition candidate Bassirou Diomaye Faye won Senegal's presidential election against the incumbent party candidate, becoming the youngest president in the country's history.

== Political parties and elections ==
=== Presidential elections ===
Candidate	Party	Votes	%
Bassirou Diomaye Faye	PASTEF	2,434,751	54.28
Amadou Ba	Alliance for the Republic	1,605,086	35.79
Aliou Mamadou Dia	Party for Unity and Rally	125,690	2.80
Khalifa Sall	Manko Taxawu Sénégal	69,760	1.56
Idrissa Seck	Rewmi	40,286	0.90
Thierno Alassane Sall	Republic of Values	25,946	0.58
Boubacar Camara	Party of Construction and Solidarity	23,359	0.52
Aly Ngouille Ndiaye	Independent	20,964	0.47
Papa Djibril Fall	The Servants / MPR	18,304	0.41
Serigne Mboup	Independent	16,049	0.36
Déthié Fall	Republican Party for Progress	15,836	0.35
Daouda Ndiaye	Independent	15,895	0.35
Anta Babacar Ngom	Alternative for the Next Generation of Citizens	15,457	0.34
Cheikh Tidiane Dieye	Independent	15,172	0.34
Mamadou Diao	Independent	14,591	0.33
Mamadou Lamine Diallo	National Patriotic Union/Tekki	9,998	0.22
Mahammed Dionne	Independent	8,435	0.19
Malick Gakou	Grand Party	6,343	0.14
Habib Sy	Independent	3,206	0.07
Total		4,485,128	100.00
Valid votes		4,485,128	99.24
Invalid/blank votes		34,125	0.76
Total votes		4,519,253	100.00
Registered voters/turnout		7,371,890	61.30
Source: Conseil constitutionnel

=== Parliamentary elections ===
According to provisional results, PASTEF won in a large majority of polling stations, and were the most-voted for party in 40 of the 46 departments and seven of the eight diaspora constituencies. Following the announcement of the results, Amadou Ba and Barthélémy Dias, who led separate opposition coalitions, conceded defeat. Takku Wallu Sénégal leader and former president Macky Sall accused PASTEF of organising "massive fraud", but later conceded defeat. On 22 November the National Commission confirmed the official results, with PASTEF winning 130 of the 165 seats. This was the largest majority obtained by a single party in a legislative election in Senegal since 1988.

Party or alliance	Votes	%	Seats		
Party or alliance	Votes	%	National	Departmental	Total
Patriots of Senegal	1,991,770	54.97	29	101	130
Takku Wallu Sénégal	531,466	14.67	8	8	16
Jàmm ak Njariñ	330,865	9.13	5	2	7
Sàmm Sa Kàddu	222,060	6.13	3	0	3
The March of the Territories / Andu Nawlé	47,636	1.31	1	1	2
Farlu	28,303	0.78	1	0	1
The Nationalists / Jël Linu Moom	26,876	0.74	1	0	1
Kiraay ak Natangue	26,775	0.74	1	0	1
Sénégaal Kese	25,822	0.71	1	0	1
Sopi Senegal	22,991	0.63	1	0	1
And Ci Koolutè Nguir Senegal	21,391	0.59	1	0	1
And Beesal Sénégal	20,765	0.57	1	0	1
Bës Du Ñakk	19,923	0.55	0	0	0
And Liggey Sunu Rew	19,373	0.53	0	0	0
And Suxali Production, Transport and Commerce	16,570	0.46	0	0	0
And Liguey Sénégal ak Racine	16,521	0.46	0	0	0
Together for Senegal	16,482	0.45	0	0	0
Great Rally of Artisans of Senegal	16,448	0.45	0	0	0
Dëkkal Teranga	16,446	0.45	0	0	0
Jubanti Senegal	15,740	0.43	0	0	0
Gox Yu Bess	15,510	0.43	0	0	0
Reincarnation of Values / Naataange	14,736	0.41	0	0	0
And Doolel Liguey Kat Yi	12,881	0.36	0	0	0
Federation of Renewal	12,277	0.34	0	0	0
Mankoo Liggeeyal Sénégal	11,733	0.32	0	0	0
National Alliance for the Fatherland	11,535	0.32	0	0	0
Nafoore Senegal	10,577	0.29	0	0	0
Samm Sunu Rew – Jotali Kaddu Askanwi	10,171	0.28	0	0	0
Actions	10,150	0.28	0	0	0
Dundu Leneen	9,686	0.27	0	0	0
Xaal Yoon	8,650	0.24	0	0	0
National Union for Integration, Work and Equity	8,511	0.23	0	0	0
Private Sector	7,415	0.20	0	0	0
Union Naatall Kaaw-Gui	7,274	0.20	0	0	0
GARAP-ADS	6,850	0.19	0	0	0
Union of Patriotic Groups	6,467	0.18	0	0	0
Wareef	5,868	0.16	0	0	0
Bunt Bi	5,125	0.14	0	0	0
Défar Sa Gokh	5,125	0.14	0	0	0
Alliance Jëf Jël	5,045	0.14	0	0	0
Sàmm Sa Gàfaka! Sàmm Sa Ëllëg!	3,824	0.11	0	0	0
Total	3,623,633	100.00	53	112	165
Valid votes	3,623,633	99.27			
Invalid/blank votes	26,487	0.73			
Total votes	3,650,120	100.00			
Registered voters/turnout	7,371,891	49.51			
Source: CENA

=== By department ===
Department	Total seats	Seats won			
Department	Total seats	PASTEF	Takku Wallu	Jàmm ak Njariñ	Andu Nawlé
Bakel	2	2			
Bambey	2	2			
Bignona	2	2			
Birkelane	1	1			
Bounkiling	2	2			
Dagana	2	2			
Dakar	7	7			
Diourbel	2	2			
Fatick	2	2			
Foundiougne	2	2			
Gossas	1				1
Goudiry	1		1		
Goudomp	2	2			
Guédiawaye	2	2			
Guinguinéo	1	1			
Kaffrine	2	2			
Kanel	2		2		
Kaolack	2	2			
Kébémer	2	2			
Kédougou	1	1			
Keur Massar	2	2			
Kolda	2	2			
Koumpentoum	2	2			
Koungheul	2	2			
Linguère	2	2			
Louga	2	2			
Malem Hodar	1	1			
Matam	2		2		
Mbacké	5	5			
M'bour	4	4			
Médina Yoro Foulah	2	2			
Nioro du Rip	2	2			
Oussouye	1	1			
Pikine	5	5			
Podor	2			2	
Ranérou Ferlo	1		1		
Rufisque	2	2			
Saint-Louis	2	2			
Salémata	1	1			
Saraya	1	1			
Sédhiou	2	2			
Tambacounda	2	2			
Thiès	4	4			
Tivaouane	2	2			
Vélingara	2	2			
Ziguinchor	2	2			
Total	97	87	7	2	1

=== By overseas constituency ===
Constituency	Total seats	Seats won	
Constituency	Total seats	PASTEF	Takku Wallu
America and Oceania	1	1	
Asia and the Middle East	1	1	
Central Africa	2		2
North Africa	1	1	
Southern Africa	1	1	
Southern Europe	3	3	
West Africa	3	3	
Western, Central and Northern Europe	3	3	
Total	15	14	1

== Judicial branch ==
The Court of Cassation is the highest court in the country, modelled after the Court of Cassation in France; its members are appointed by the president.

== Administrative divisions ==
Senegal is subdivided into 13 regions (régions, singular – région):

Dakar, Diourbel, Fatick, Kaolack, Kédougou, Kolda, Louga, Matam, Saint-Louis, Sédhiou, Tambacounda, Thiès, Ziguinchor. Local administrators are all appointed by and responsible to the President.

== See also ==
- Government of Senegal
