= Fourth Sall government =

- Cabinet of Senegal

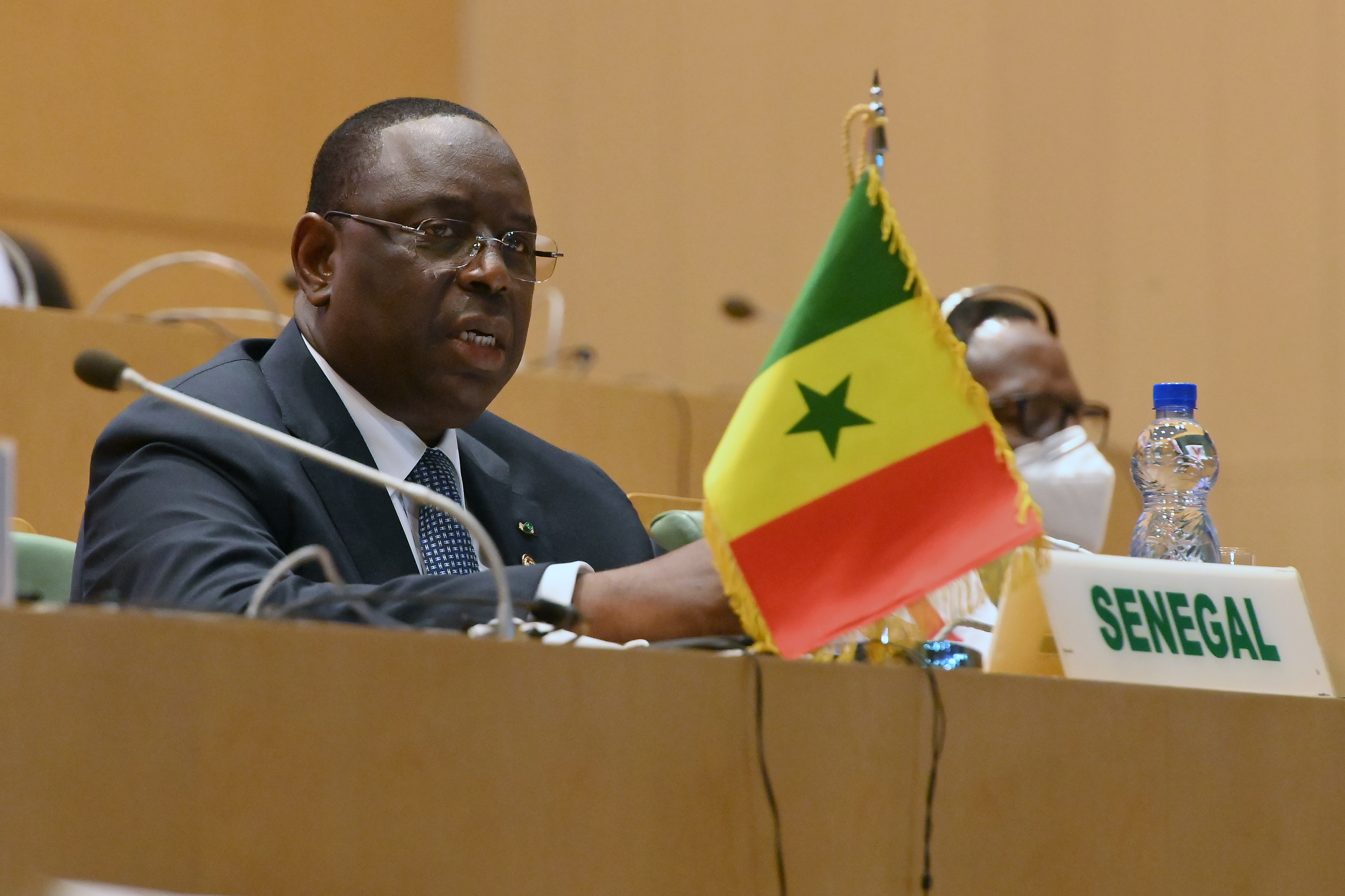
- Date formed: 1 November 2020
- Date dissolved: 2 April 2024

People and organisations
- President: Macky Sall
- Prime Minister: Amadou Ba (from 17 September 2022)
- Member parties: Alliance for the Republic; Alliance of the Forces of Progress; Socialist Party of Senegal; Rewmi
- Status in legislature: 2020–2022; Majority coalition government 125 / 165 (76%) 2022–present Minority coalition government 81 / 165 (49%) Supported by Bokk Gis Gis
- Opposition parties: Liberate the People; Wallu Sénégal; The Servants / MPR; Alternative for a Rupture Assembly

History
- Legislature terms: 4th National Assembly; 5th National Assembly
- Predecessor: Third Sall government
- Successor: Faye government

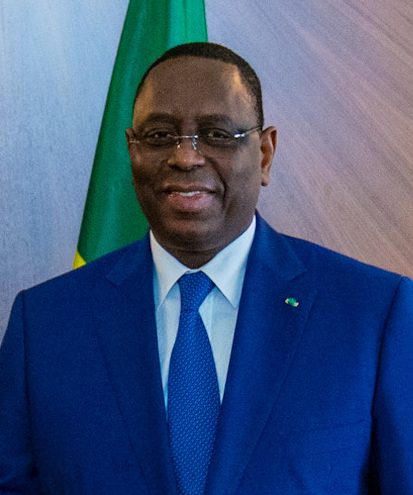
President Macky Sall in 2020.

The Fourth Sall government governed Senegal from 1 November 2020 to 2 April 2024. It was the fourth government formed by Macky Sall.

== Cabinet ==
=== Cabinet Ministers ===
Cabinet members
Portfolio	Minister	Took office	Left office	Party
Prime Minister	Amadou Ba	17 September 2022	Incumbent	APR
Minister of the Armed Forces	Sidiki Kaba	1 November 2020	6 October 2023	Independent
Minister of the Armed Forces	Omar Youm	6 October 2023	Incumbent	APR
Minister of Finance and Budget	Abdoulaye Daouda Diallo	1 November 2020	17 September 2022	APR
Minister of Finance and Budget	Mamadou Moustapha Ba	17 September 2023	Incumbent	APR
Minister of Justice and Keeper of the Seals	Malick Sall	1 November 2020	17 September 2022	PS
Minister of Justice and Keeper of the Seals	Ismaïla Madior Fall	17 September 2022	11 October 2023	Independent
Minister of Justice and Keeper of the Seals	Aïssata Tall Sall	11 October 2023	Incumbent	PS
Minister of Foreign Affairs and Senegalese Abroad	Aïssata Tall Sall	1 November 2020	11 October 2023	PS
Minister of Foreign Affairs and Senegalese Abroad	Ismaïla Madior Fall	11 October 2023	Incumbent	Independent
Minister of the Interior	Antoine Diome	1 November 2020	6 October 2023	Independent
Minister of the Interior	Sidiki Kaba	11 October 2023	Incumbent	Independent
Minister of Infrastructure, Land Transport and Opening up	Mansour Faye	1 November 2020	Incumbent	APR
Minister of Economy, Planning and Cooperation	Amadou Hott	1 November 2020	Incumbent	APR
Minister of Public Service and Public Service Renewal	Mariama Sarr	1 November 2020	17 September 2022	APR
Minister of Public Service and Public Service Renewal	Gallo Ba	17 September 2022	Incumbent	APR
Minister of Health and Social Action	Abdoulaye Diouf Sarr	1 November 2020	26 May 2022	APR
Minister of Health and Social Action	Marie Khemesse Ngom Ndiaye	26 May 2022	Incumbent	Independent
Minister for Women, Family, Gender and Child Protection	Ndeye Saly Diop Dieng	1 November 2020	17 September 2022	APR
Minister for Women, Family, Gender and Child Protection	Fatou Dianee	17 September 2022	Incumbent	Independent
Minister of Mines and Geology	Oumar Sarr	1 November 2020	Incumbent	PLD/AS
Minister of Agriculture, Rural Equipment and Food Sovereignty	Moussa Baldé	1 November 2020	17 September 2022	APR
Minister of Agriculture, Rural Equipment and Food Sovereignty	Aly Ngouille Ndiaye	17 September 2022	11 October 2023	APR
Minister of Agriculture, Rural Equipment and Food Sovereignty	Samba Ndiobène KA	11 October 2023	Incumbent	APR
Minister of Water and Sanitation	Serigne Mbaye Thiam	1 November 2020	Incumbent	PS
Minister of Tourism and Air Transport	Alioune Sarr	1 November 2020	Incumbent	AFP
Minister of Territorial Communities, Development and Regional Planning	Oumar Guèye	1 November 2020	17 September 2022	Rewmi
Minister of Territorial Communities, Development and Regional Planning	Mamadou Talla	17 September 2022	Incumbent	AFP
Minister of National Education	Mamadou Talla	1 November 2020	17 September 2022	AFP
Minister of National Education	Sheikh Oumar Anne	17 September 2022	Incumbent	APR
Minister of Higher Education, Research and Innovation	Sheikh Oumar Anne	1 November 2020	17 September 2022	APR
Minister of Higher Education, Research and Innovation	Moussa Balde	17 September 2022	Incumbent	APR
Minister of Petroleum and Energy	Sophie Gladima	1 November 2020	11 October 2023	Independent
Minister of Petroleum and Energy	Antoine Diome	11 October 2023	Incumbent	Independent
Minister of Community Development, Social and Territorial Equity	Samba Ndiobène Ka	1 November 2020	11 October 2023	Independent
Minister of Community Development, Social and Territorial Equity	Modou Diagne Fada	11 October 2023	Incumbent	LDR-Yessal
Minister of Industrial Development and Small and Medium Industries	Moustapha Diop	1 November 2020	Incumbent	APR
Minister of Fisheries and Maritime Economy	Alioune Ndoye	1 November 2020	17 September 2022	PS
Minister of Fisheries and Maritime Economy	Papa Sagna Mbaye	17 September 2022	Incumbent	AFP
Minister of Labour, Social Dialogue and Relations with Institutions	Samba Sy	1 November 2020	Incumbent	PIT
Minister of Environment, Sustainable Development and Ecological Transition	Abdou Karim Sall	1 November 2020	17 September 2022	APR
Minister of Environment, Sustainable Development and Ecological Transition	Alioune Ndoye	17 September 2022	Incumbent	PS
Minister of Sports	Matar Bâ	1 November 2020	17 September 2022	APR
Minister of Sports	Diattara Yankoba	17 September 2022	April 2023	Rewmi
Minister of Sports	Lat Diop's	April 2023	Incumbent	APR
Minister of Urbanism, Housing and Public Hygiene	Abdoulaye Seydou Sow	1 November 2020	Incumbent	APR
Minister of Trade, Consumer Affairs and Small and Medium Enterprises	Aminata Assome Diatta	1 November 2020	17 September 2022	Independent
Minister of Trade, Consumer Affairs and Small and Medium Enterprises	Abdou Karim Fofana	17 September 2022	Incumbent	APR
Minister of Culture and Historical Heritage	Abdoulaye Diop	1 November 2020	16 September 2022	PDS
Minister of Culture and Historical Heritage	Aliou Sow	17 September 2022	Incumbent	MPD/LIGGEEY
Minister of Livestock and Animal Production	Aly Saleh Diop	1 November 2020	April 2023	Rewmi
Minister of Livestock and Animal Production	Daouda Dia	April 2023	Incumbent	APR
Minister of Youth, Entrepreneurship and Employment	Néné Fatoumata Tall	1 November 2020	17 September 2022	APR
Minister of Youth, Entrepreneurship and Employment	Pope Malick Ndour	17 September 2022	Incumbent	APR
Minister of Microfinance and Social and Solidarity Economy	Zahra Iyane Thiam	1 November 2020	17 September 2022	APR
Minister of Microfinance and Social and Solidarity Economy	Victorine Ndeye	17 September 2022	Incumbent	APR
Minister of Vocational Training, Apprenticeship and Integration	Dame Diop	1 November 2020	17 September 2022	APR
Minister of Vocational Training, Apprenticeship and Integration	Mariama Sarr	17 September 2022	Incumbent	APR
Minister of Handicrafts and Transformation of the Informal Sector	Papa Amadou Ndiaye	1 November 2020	11 October 2023	APR
Minister of Handicrafts and Transformation of the Informal Sector	Faye Biram	11 October 2023	Incumbent	APR
Minister of Communication, Telecommunications and Digital Economy	Yankhoba Diattara	1 November 2020	17 September 2022	Rewmi
Minister of Communication, Telecommunications and Digital Economy	Moussa Bocar Thiam	17 September 2022	Incumbent	APR

=== Secretaries of State ===
Cabinet members
Portfolio	Minister	Took office	Left office	Party
Secretary of State to the Minister of Foreign Affairs and Senegalese Abroad, in charge of Senegalese Abroad	Moïse Diar Diégane Sarr	1 November 2020	17 September 2022	Independent
Secretary of State to the Minister of Foreign Affairs and Senegalese Abroad, in charge of Senegalese Abroad	Annette Seck	17 September 2022	Incumbent	APR
Secretary of State to the Keeper of the Seals and Minister of Justice, responsible for the Promotion of Human Rights and Good Governance	Mamadou Saliou Sow	1 November 2020	Incumbent	Independent
Secretary of State to the Minister of Infrastructure, Land Transport and Opening up, in charge of the rail network	Mayacine Camara	1 November 2020	Incumbent	APR
Secretary of State to the Minister of Infrastructure, Land Transport and Opening up, in charge of the rail network	Moussa Bocar Thiam	17 September 2022	Incumbent	APR
Secretary of State to the Minister of Urbanism, Housing and Public Hygiene, in charge of Housing	Victorine Ndeye	1 November 2020	17 September 2022	APR
Secretary of State to the Minister of the Interior, in charge of proximity security and civil protection	Faye Biram	17 September 2022	Incumbent	APR
Secretary of State to the Minister of Water and Sanitation, in charge of flood Prevention and management	Issakha DIOP	17 September 2022	Incumbent	Independent

== See also ==
- Politics of Senegal
