= 2024 Senegalese parliamentary election =

- 17 November 2024
- All 165 seats in the National Assembly; 83 seats needed for a majority
- Turnout: 49.51% (▲2.91pp)
Party	Leader	Vote %	Seats
PASTEF	Ousmane Sonko	54.97	130
Takku Wallu Sénégal	Macky Sall	14.67	16
Jàmm ak Njariñ	Amadou Ba	9.13	7
Sàmm Sa Kàddu	Barthélémy Dias	6.13	3
Andu Nawlé	Maguette Séne	1.31	2
Farlu	Moustapha Diop	0.78	1
The Nationalists	Tahirou Sarr	0.74	1
Kiraay ak Natangue	Birima Mangara	0.74	1
Sénégaal Kese	Thierno Alassane Sall	0.71	1
Sopi Senegal	Tafsir Thioye	0.63	1
And Ci Koolutè	Abdoul Karim Sall	0.59	1
And Beesal Sénégal	Abdoulaye Sylla	0.57	1
This lists parties that won seats. See the complete results below.
Prime Minister before	Prime Minister after
Ousmane Sonko; PASTEF	Ousmane Sonko; PASTEF

Parliamentary elections were held in Senegal on 17 November 2024 following the early dissolution of the National Assembly by president Bassirou Diomaye Faye. The decision to dissolve the Assembly came during a politically tense period, with Faye seeking a stronger mandate for his administration’s policies amid growing economic challenges and increasing public demands for reform.

The election resulted in a decisive victory for Faye's party PASTEF, which won an absolute majority in the National Assembly with 130 of the 165 seats. The main opposition coalition, Takku Wallu Sénégal, managed to secure 16 seats, while Jàmm ak Njariñ took 7 seats.

== Background ==
On 12 September 2024, President Bassirou Diomaye Faye dissolved the National Assembly and ordered snap elections for the chamber on 17 November. Faye, who took office on 2 April, and his prime minister, Ousmane Sonko, had previously been in conflict with the opposition-controlled legislature and accused the latter of blocking his proposed reforms and budget.

== Electoral system ==
The 165 members of the National Assembly are elected by two methods; 112 are elected by either first-past-the-post or party bloc vote in single- or multi-member constituencies based on the 46 departments (15 seats are elected by overseas diaspora voters). The other 53 seats are elected from a nationwide constituency by proportional representation, with seats allocated initially using the simple quotient, with remaining seats allocated using the largest remainder method.

== Parties ==
Below is a list of the main parties and coalitions fielding lists in the election.

An "inter-coalition" was formed in some departments between Takku Wallu Sénégal, Sàmm Sa Kàddu and Jàmm ak Njariñ.

Coalition	Party	Abbr.	Main ideology	Position	Leader	Lead candidate
—N/a	African Patriots of Senegal for Work, Ethics and Fraternity	PASTEF	Left-wing populism	Left-wing	Ousmane Sonko	
Takku Wallu Sénégal; Unite to Save Senegal	Alliance for the Republic	APR	Liberalism	Centre	Macky Sall	Macky Sall
Takku Wallu Sénégal; Unite to Save Senegal	Senegalese Democratic Party	PDS	Liberalism	Centre	Abdoulaye Wade	Macky Sall
Takku Wallu Sénégal; Unite to Save Senegal	Rewmi		Liberalism	Centre	Idrissa Seck	Macky Sall
Takku Wallu Sénégal; Unite to Save Senegal	Bokk Gis Gis		Liberalism	Centre	Pape Diop	Macky Sall
Takku Wallu Sénégal; Unite to Save Senegal	Union of Centrists of Senegal	UCS	Liberalism	Centre	Abdoulaye Baldé	Macky Sall
Sàmm Sa Kàddu; Protecting Your Word	Taxawu Sénégal	TS	Liberalism	Centre	Khalifa Sall	Barthélémy Dias
Sàmm Sa Kàddu; Protecting Your Word	Party for Unity and Rally	PUR	Islamic democracy	Right-wing	Serigne Moustapha Sy	Barthélémy Dias
Sàmm Sa Kàddu; Protecting Your Word	Alternative for Citizen Succession	ARC	Progressivism	Centre-left	Anta Babacar Ngom	Barthélémy Dias
Sàmm Sa Kàddu; Protecting Your Word	The Servants / MPR		Liberalism	Centre	Pape Djibril Fall	Barthélémy Dias
Sàmm Sa Kàddu; Protecting Your Word	Generational Alliance for the Interests of the Republic	AGIR	Liberal conservatism	Centre-right	Thierno Bocoum	Barthélémy Dias
Sàmm Sa Kàddu; Protecting Your Word	Gueum Sa Bopp		Liberalism	Centre	Bougane Gueye Dany	Barthélémy Dias
Jàmm ak Njariñ; Peace and Prosperity	New Responsibility	NR	Social democracy	Centre-left	Amadou Ba	Amadou Ba
Jàmm ak Njariñ; Peace and Prosperity	Socialist Party of Senegal	PS	Social democracy	Centre-left	Aminata Mbengue Ndiaye	Amadou Ba
Jàmm ak Njariñ; Peace and Prosperity	Alliance of the Forces of Progress	AFP	Social democracy	Centre-left	Moustapha Niasse	Amadou Ba
Jàmm ak Njariñ; Peace and Prosperity	Democratic League/Movement for the Labour Party	LD/MPT	Socialism	Left-wing	Mamadou Ndoye	Amadou Ba
Jàmm ak Njariñ; Peace and Prosperity	Party of Independence and Labour	PIT	Socialism	Left-wing	Vacant	Amadou Ba

== Conduct ==
Several incidents of violence were reported during the election. On 28 October 2024, unidentified persons attacked the headquarters of an opposition party in Dakar and started a fire. On 30 October, Sonko and Faye's party PASTEF said that Sonko's convoy was pelted with stones during a campaign sortie in Koungheul, injuring former minister Malick Gakou, who is the concurrent leader of an allied party. In response, opposition MP Fanta Sall said that armed “strongmen” acting on behalf of PASTEF had attacked opposition activists. On 12 November, Sonko tweeted that attacks against PASTEF supporters would lead to them exercising a "legitimate right to respond", but later retracted his statement and urged calm in a speech later that day.

Polling began at 08:00 and ended at 18:00.

== Results ==
According to provisional results, PASTEF won in a large majority of polling stations, and were the most-voted for party in 40 of the 46 departments and seven of the eight diaspora constituencies. Following the announcement of the results, Amadou Ba and Barthélémy Dias, who led separate opposition coalitions, conceded defeat. Takku Wallu Sénégal leader and former president Macky Sall accused PASTEF of organising "massive fraud", but later conceded defeat. On 22 November the National Commission confirmed the official results, with PASTEF winning 130 of the 165 seats. This was the largest majority obtained by a single party in a legislative election in Senegal since 1988.

Party or alliance	Votes	%	Seats		
Party or alliance	Votes	%	National	Departmental	Total
Patriots of Senegal	1,991,770	54.97	29	101	130
Takku Wallu Sénégal	531,466	14.67	8	8	16
Jàmm ak Njariñ	330,865	9.13	5	2	7
Sàmm Sa Kàddu	222,060	6.13	3	0	3
The March of the Territories / Andu Nawlé	47,636	1.31	1	1	2
Farlu	28,303	0.78	1	0	1
The Nationalists / Jël Linu Moom	26,876	0.74	1	0	1
Kiraay ak Natangue	26,775	0.74	1	0	1
Sénégaal Kese	25,822	0.71	1	0	1
Sopi Senegal	22,991	0.63	1	0	1
And Ci Koolutè Nguir Senegal	21,391	0.59	1	0	1
And Beesal Sénégal	20,765	0.57	1	0	1
Bës Du Ñakk	19,923	0.55	0	0	0
And Liggey Sunu Rew	19,373	0.53	0	0	0
And Suxali Production, Transport and Commerce	16,570	0.46	0	0	0
And Liguey Sénégal ak Racine	16,521	0.46	0	0	0
Together for Senegal	16,482	0.45	0	0	0
Great Rally of Artisans of Senegal	16,448	0.45	0	0	0
Dëkkal Teranga	16,446	0.45	0	0	0
Jubanti Senegal	15,740	0.43	0	0	0
Gox Yu Bess	15,510	0.43	0	0	0
Reincarnation of Values / Naataange	14,736	0.41	0	0	0
And Doolel Liguey Kat Yi	12,881	0.36	0	0	0
Federation of Renewal	12,277	0.34	0	0	0
Mankoo Liggeeyal Sénégal	11,733	0.32	0	0	0
National Alliance for the Fatherland	11,535	0.32	0	0	0
Nafoore Senegal	10,577	0.29	0	0	0
Samm Sunu Rew – Jotali Kaddu Askanwi	10,171	0.28	0	0	0
Actions	10,150	0.28	0	0	0
Dundu Leneen	9,686	0.27	0	0	0
Xaal Yoon	8,650	0.24	0	0	0
National Union for Integration, Work and Equity	8,511	0.23	0	0	0
Private Sector	7,415	0.20	0	0	0
Union Naatall Kaaw-Gui	7,274	0.20	0	0	0
GARAP-ADS	6,850	0.19	0	0	0
Union of Patriotic Groups	6,467	0.18	0	0	0
Wareef	5,868	0.16	0	0	0
Bunt Bi	5,125	0.14	0	0	0
Défar Sa Gokh	5,125	0.14	0	0	0
Alliance Jëf Jël	5,045	0.14	0	0	0
Sàmm Sa Gàfaka! Sàmm Sa Ëllëg!	3,824	0.11	0	0	0
Total	3,623,633	100.00	53	112	165
Valid votes	3,623,633	99.27			
Invalid/blank votes	26,487	0.73			
Total votes	3,650,120	100.00			
Registered voters/turnout	7,371,891	49.51			
Source: CENA

=== By department ===
Department	Total seats	Seats won			
Department	Total seats	PASTEF	Takku Wallu	Jàmm ak Njariñ	Andu Nawlé
Bakel	2	2			
Bambey	2	2			
Bignona	2	2			
Birkelane	1	1			
Bounkiling	2	2			
Dagana	2	2			
Dakar	7	7			
Diourbel	2	2			
Fatick	2	2			
Foundiougne	2	2			
Gossas	1				1
Goudiry	1		1		
Goudomp	2	2			
Guédiawaye	2	2			
Guinguinéo	1	1			
Kaffrine	2	2			
Kanel	2		2		
Kaolack	2	2			
Kébémer	2	2			
Kédougou	1	1			
Keur Massar	2	2			
Kolda	2	2			
Koumpentoum	2	2			
Koungheul	2	2			
Linguère	2	2			
Louga	2	2			
Malem Hodar	1	1			
Matam	2		2		
Mbacké	5	5			
M'bour	4	4			
Médina Yoro Foulah	2	2			
Nioro du Rip	2	2			
Oussouye	1	1			
Pikine	5	5			
Podor	2			2	
Ranérou Ferlo	1		1		
Rufisque	2	2			
Saint-Louis	2	2			
Salémata	1	1			
Saraya	1	1			
Sédhiou	2	2			
Tambacounda	2	2			
Thiès	4	4			
Tivaouane	2	2			
Vélingara	2	2			
Ziguinchor	2	2			
Total	97	87	7	2	1

=== By overseas constituency ===
Constituency	Total seats	Seats won	
Constituency	Total seats	PASTEF	Takku Wallu
America and Oceania	1	1	
Asia and the Middle East	1	1	
Central Africa	2		2
North Africa	1	1	
Southern Africa	1	1	
Southern Europe	3	3	
West Africa	3	3	
Western, Central and Northern Europe	3	3	
Total	15	14	1
