= Sàmm Sa Kàddu =

Protecting Your Word Sàmm Sa Kàddu
- Abbreviation: SSK ; Kàddu
- Leader: Barthélémy Dias
- Founded: 23 September 2024
- Preceded by: Yewwi Askan Wi (partially)
- Ideology: Populism
- Political position: Big tent
- Member parties: Taxawu Sénégal; Party for Unity and Rally; ARC; The Servants; AGIR; Gueum Sa Bopp
- Colours: Green; Yellow
- National Assembly: 3 / 165

Website
- Facebook page

Sàmm Sa Kàddu (lit. 'Protecting Your Word'; SSK or just Kàddu) is a Senegalese political coalition led by the Mayor of Dakar Barthélémy Dias. The coalition was established ahead of the snap 2024 parliamentary election.

== History ==
The foundation of the Sàmm Sa Kàddu/Save Senegal coalition was announced on 23 September 2024 in a communiqué signed by the Party for Unity and Rally (PUR), Taxawu Sénégal, Alternative for Citizen Succession (ARC), The Servants / MPR, Republican Party for Progress (PRP), Generational Alliance for the Interests of the Republic (AGIR) and Gueum Sa Bopp parties.

Takku Wallu Sénégal became part of a broad anti-PASTEF "inter-coalition", along with two other colaitions: Takku Wallu Sénégal led by Macky Sall and Jàmm ak Njariñ led by Amadou Ba. The coalitions joined forces in almost all of Senegal's departments, forming joint lists.

On 23 October, Déthié Fall, leader of the Republican Party for Progress, announced that he was leaving the Sàmm Sa Kàddu coalition and joining the ruling PASTEF. After this, the leader of the women's wing of PRP left the party.

== Ideology ==
Sàmm Sa Kàddu positions itself as the "Anti-Sonko third way" and "constructive opposition and the only generational alternative to PASTEF". The coalition advocates for the renewal and rejuvenation of the Senegalese political class.

== Composition ==
Party	Abbr.	Leader	Ideology	Membership
Taxawu Sénégal; Revival of Senegal	TS	Khalifa Sall	Liberalism; Social liberalism	2024–present
Party for Unity and Rally; Parti de l'unité et du rassemblement	PUR	Serigne Moustapha Sy	Islamic democracy Social conservatism	2024–present
Alternative for Citizen Succession; Alternative pour la relève citoyenne	ARC	Anta Babacar Ngom	Progressivism; Youth politics	2024–present
The Servants; Les Serviteurs	LS	Pape Djibril Fall	Liberalism; Economic liberalism	2024–present
Generational Alliance for the Interests of the Republic; Alliance générationelle pour les intérêts de la République	AGIR	Thierno Bocoum	Liberal conservatism	2024–present
Gueum Sa Bopp	GSB	Bougane Gueye Dany	Liberalism; Economic liberalism	2024–present
Republican Party for Progress; Parti républicain pour le progrès	PRP	Dethie Fall	Social democracy	Sep–Oct 2024

== Electoral results ==
=== Parliamentary elections ===
Year	Leader	Votes	%	Seats	+/–	Rank	Status
2024	Barthélémy Dias	222,060	6.13% (#4)	3 / 165	New	New	Opposition
