= Tahirou Sarr =

Senegalese politician (born 1985)

Member of the National Assembly of Senegal
- Incumbent
- Assumed office 2 December 2024

Personal details
- Born: Papa Tahirou Sarr; 1985 (age 40–41) Dakar, Senegal
- Party: The Nationalists
- Other political affiliations: Rewmi (until 2020)
- Occupation: Political consultant

Papa Tahirou Sarr (born 1985) is a Senegalese politician and political consultant. He leads the nationalist party The Nationalists (Jël Linu Moom) and has been a member of the National Assembly since 2024.

His proposals to restrict the rights of foreigners in Senegal have been widely described by Senegalese and French media as xenophobic, a label he has said he does not fear.

== Biography ==
=== Early life and education ===
Sarr was born in 1985 in Dakar. He works as a consultant in a political consulting firm.

=== Career ===
Sarr was national secretary of Idrissa Seck's party Rewmi. He resigned in November 2020 after Seck was appointed president of the Economic, Social and Environmental Council, accusing his former mentor of having betrayed Senegal.

As president of the Senegalese Nationalist Movement, he supported the candidacy of Bassirou Diomaye Faye in the 2024 Senegalese presidential election. In the parliamentary election of 17 November 2024, his list won 26,876 votes (0.74%) and one seat, which he took up on 2 December 2024. He sits as a non-attached member and describes himself as a "non-aligned" deputy who supports the PASTEF programme while reserving the right to criticise the government. He serves on the defence and security committee and the health and social affairs committee.

In July 2025, he presented the founding texts of his party, Jël Linu Moom, and urged Prime Minister Ousmane Sonko to adopt a more conciliatory tone. In February 2026, he tabled a bill making the sale of civil registry documents a specific criminal offence, punishable by five to ten years in prison. By mid-2026, commentators noted that his public appearances had become rare.

Sarr advocates residence permits for foreigners (except Gambians), a national register of foreigners, national preference in housing, employment and public procurement, and a ban on land ownership by foreigners. He has also proposed restricting Senegalese nationality to people with Senegalese parents, and barring Lebanese women from giving birth in Senegal, citing reciprocity. He has said he does not fear being called racist or xenophobic.

In April 2024, the national audiovisual regulator (CNRA) warned broadcasters that relaying his remarks could incite hatred and discrimination, and asked them to stop airing such content. Le Monde described him as an "uninhibited xenophobe" on his entry into parliament, and some opponents, including an official of the Party of Independence and Labour, have compared him to Éric Zemmour. In October 2026, he filed a complaint for public insult against the influencer Noura Ba.
