= Aïssata Tall Sall =

Senegalese lawyer and politician

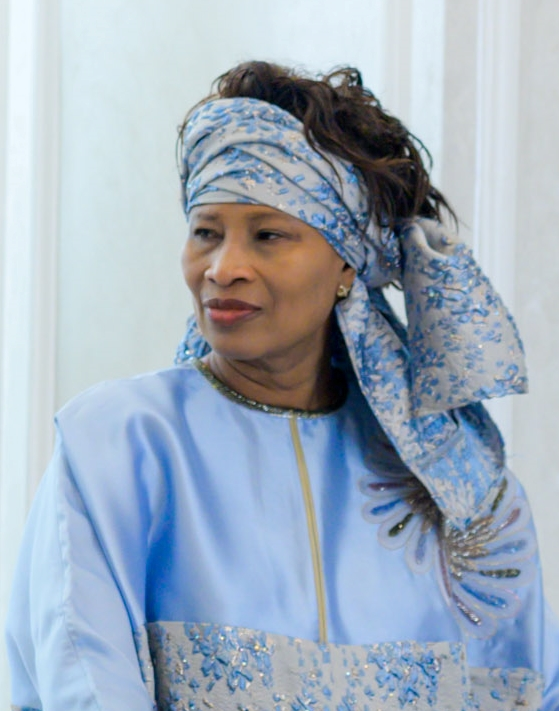

Foreign Minister of Senegal
- In office 1 November 2020 – 11 October 2023
- President: Macky Sall
- Prime Minister: Mahammed Dionne; Amadou Ba
- Preceded by: Amadou Ba
- Succeeded by: Ismaïla Madior Fall

Leader of the Opposition
- Prime Minister: Ousmane Sonko

Personal details
- Born: 12 December 1957 (age 68) Podor, Senegal
- Party: Socialist Party of Senegal
- Other political affiliations: Takku Wallu Sénégal

Aïssata Tall Sall (born 12 December 1957) is a Senegalese lawyer and politician who served as Foreign Minister from November 2020 to October 2023.

== Early life and education ==
Tall was born on 12 December 1957 in Podor and comes from a conservative Marabout family. She is the eldest of nine daughters and two sons and moved to Dakar for her education after primary school. She studied law at the University of Dakar and when the Bar Council would not integrate them, she and thirty other young lawyers took them to the Court of Appeal and won. She was registered with the Senegal Bar in 1982.

== Career ==
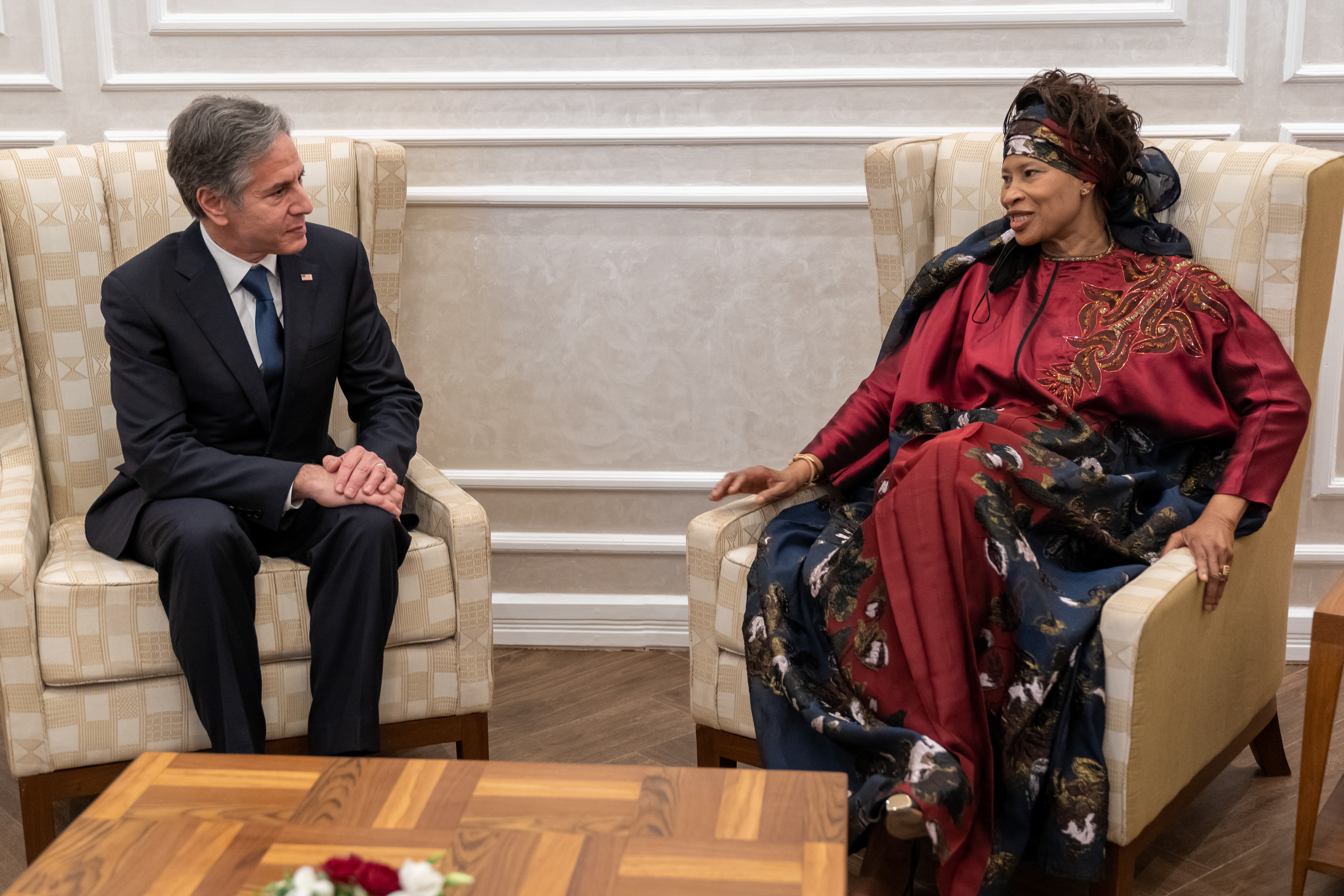
Tall meets with US Secretary of State Antony Blinken in 2021

Tall specialised in business law before becoming involved in politics. She was an advocate in a number of political trials against the Wade regime from 2000 to 2012. She also represented Ivorian generals Lassana Palenfo and Ibrahim Coulibaly, former Mauritanian president Mohamed Khouna Ould Haidalla, former Togolese prime minister Agbéyomé Kodjo and Malian interim president Dioncounda Traoré. During the trial of Palenfo and Coulibaly, filmmaker Abderrahmane Sissako approached her and she portrayed herself in the 2006 film Bamako, about a case against the IMF and the World Bank.

Tall served as Minister of Communication in the government of Abdou Diouf from 1998 to 2000. She was elected Mayor of Podor in April 2009 and re-elected in June 2014. She was also a member of the National Assembly in the coalition Benno Bokk Yaakaar ("United in the Same Hope").

Tall is a member of the Socialist Party of Senegal. In June 2014, she contested an internal election for Secretary General of the Party against Ousmane Tanor Dieng. The electoral competition was ended, however, by the president of the National Steering and Evaluation Committee and Dakar mayor, Khalifa Sall, citing risks to unity and cohesion, leaving Tanor to be re-elected unopposed. She briefly left the party in 2018 to set up her own movement called "Daring the Future", but did not receive enough signatures to contest elections.

Tall supported Macky Sall during the February 2019 presidential election, saying it was "in the interests of Sengal" and was soon after appointed a "Special Envoy" of the President. She was appointed Foreign Minister in Sall's replacement cabinet on 1 November 2020, the first woman in the role. At the ceremony to handover the role from her predecessor Amadou Ba, she set out a roadmap focused on fighting against "clandestine emigration" and the idea that success is only possible elsewhere.

Tall has said that her desire is to be the first female head of state in Francophone Africa.

In December 2024, Aïssata Tall Sall was appointed leader of the opposition, to chair the Takku Wallu Senegal parliamentary group, which won 16 seats in the National Assembly.

== Personal life ==
Tall is married to Issa Sall, a magistrate. She speaks French and Pular.
