= Manko Wattu Sénégal =

Political party in Senegal

The Manko Wattu Sénégal coalition is a group of several political parties organised to contest the 2017 Senegalese legislative elections. The coalition was organised and principally led by the Senegalese Democratic Party (PDS) of former President Abdoulaye Wade, but also included former breakaway Bokk Gis Gis and several other smaller parties. The group won 19 seats in the election, a slight increase on the 12 won by the PDS in 2012.

The coalition was formed after negotiations to form a unified opposition list, the Manko Taxawu Sénégal coalition, broke down over disputes on whether Wade or imprisoned former Mayor of Dakar, Khalifa Sall, would head the list. Inside the National Assembly, it caucuses as the Group for Freedom and Democracy.
