= 2025–2026 Cheikh Anta Diop University protests =

Student protests in Dakar, Senegal

The 2025–2026 Cheikh Anta Diop University protests are an ongoing series of student protests at Cheikh Anta Diop University (UCAD) in Dakar, Senegal.

== History ==
The protests began in early December 2025. The instigating factor of the protests was student stipends going unpaid, leaving many students at the university unable to financially support themselves. Another instigating factor was disappointment in the government of Ousmane Sonko, who became prime minister following the 2024 Senegalese presidential election, having run on a platform of reforms.

On 9 February 2026, medical student Abdoulaye Ba was killed by Senegalese police. Student groups at the university alleged police brutality, claiming that the police had stormed the campus residences and attacked the students inside. An autopsy report that was widely covered in African news media found that Ba had suffered "a major traumatic event that led to acute cardiorespiratory failure secondary to multiple internal haemorrhages." Ibrahima Ndoye, the public prosecutor of the Dakar court, rejected the autopsy report, saying that Ba had not been injured by police but had instead been fleeing a fire that broke out in the residence when he "jumped from the fourth floor of Pavilion F and unfortunately landed on the asphalt."

Following Ba's death, the university announced that it would suspend the student associations on campus. On 17 February 2026, student associations declared a 72-hour strike, demanding that the arrested student leaders be released, that Ba's death be properly investigated, and that the missing stipends be paid.
