= Jàmm ak Njariñ =

Peace and Prosperity Jàmm ak Njariñ
- Abbreviation: JaN
- Leader: Amadou Ba
- Founded: 24 September 2024
- Preceded by: Benno Bokk Yaakaar (partially)
- Ideology: Social democracy Democratic socialism
- Political position: Centre-left to left-wing
- Member parties: New Responsibility; Socialist Party; Alliance of the Forces of Progress; Democratic League; Party of Independence and Labour
- Colours: Green
- National Assembly: 7 / 165

Website
- Facebook page

Jàmm ak Njariñ (French: Paix et prospérité; lit. 'Peace and Prosperity') is a Senegalese centre-left political coalition led by former Prime Minister and 2024 presidential candidate Amadou Ba, who is also the leader of the New Responsibility party. The coalition was established ahead of the snap 2024 parliamentary election.

== History ==
The Jàmm ak Njariñ coalition was formed on 24 September and presented on 25 September 2024. The coalition consists of about 30 left-wing parties, the largest of which are the Socialist Party of Senegal (PS), the Alliance of the Forces of Progress (AFP), the Democratic League (LD/MPT) and the Party of Independence and Labour (PIT).

Jàmm ak Njariñ became part of a broad anti-PASTEF "inter-coalition", along with two other colaitions: Takku Wallu Sénégal led by Macky Sall and Sàmm Sa Kàddu led by Barthélémy Dias. The coalitions joined forces in almost all of Senegal's departments, forming joint lists.

== Ideology ==
The coalition, by its own statements, claims to be a "plural left". The coalition, which opposes the PASTEF government, says it wants to "promote the principles of peace, democracy, respect for institutions, calm and tranquility".

== Composition ==
| Party | Abbr. | Leader | Ideology | Membership |
|---|---|---|---|---|
| New Responsibility; Nouvelle responsabilité | NR | Amadou Ba | Social democracy | 2024–present |
| Socialist Party of Senegal; Parti socialiste du Sénégal | PS | Aminata Mbengue Ndiaye | Social democracy Democratic socialism | 2024–present |
| Alliance of the Forces of Progress; Alliance des forces de progrès | AFP | Moustapha Niasse | Social democracy | 2024–present |
| Democratic League/Movement for the Labour Party; Ligue démocratique/Mouvement pour le parti du travail | LD/MPT | Mamadou Ndoye | Socialism | 2024–present |
| Party of Independence and Labour; Parti de l'indépendance et du travail | PIT | Vacant | Socialism | 2024–present |

== Electoral results ==
=== Parliamentary elections ===
| Year | Leader | Votes | % | Seats | +/– | Rank | Status |
|---|---|---|---|---|---|---|---|
| 2024 | Amadou Ba | 330,865 | 9.13% (#3) | 7 / 165 | New | New | Opposition |
