= Abdou Mbow =

Senegalese politician

Abdou Mbow (born January 9, 1976, in Thies) is a Senegalese politician. He is the fourth vice president of the Senegalese National Assembly. Mbow is the spokesperson for the Alliance for the Republic (Senegal).
