= Takku Wallu Sénégal =

Stand Up to Save Senegal Takku Wallu Sénégal
- Abbreviation: TWS
- Leader: Macky Sall
- Founded: 25 September 2024
- Preceded by: Benno Bokk Yaakaar; Wallu Sénégal
- Ideology: Liberalism; Economic liberalism
- Political position: Centre to centre-right
- Member parties: Alliance for the Republic; Senegalese Democratic Party; Rewmi; Bokk Gis Gis; Union of Centrists of Senegal etc.
- Colours: Brown; Blue
- National Assembly: 16 / 165

Website
- Facebook page

Takku Wallu Sénégal (TWS; French: Debout pour sauver le Sénégal; lit. 'Stand Up to Save Senegal') is a Senegalese liberal political coalition led by former President Macky Sall. The coalition's main components are the two former ruling parties, Alliance for the Republic and the Senegalese Democratic Party, as well as Rewmi, Bokk Gis Gis, Union of Centrists of Senegal and other parties.

== History ==
The Takku Wallu Sénégal Grand Coalition was founded on 25 September 2024 on the eve of the snap parliamentary election. About 125 political parties and movements took part in the creation of the coalition.

Takku Wallu Sénégal became part of a broad anti-PASTEF "inter-coalition", along with two other colaitions: Sàmm Sa Kàddu led by Barthélémy Dias and Jàmm ak Njariñ led by Amadou Ba. The coalitions joined forces in almost all of Senegal's departments, forming joint lists.

On 30 September 2024, it was announced that former Senegalese President Macky Sall would become the leader of the national list of the Takku Wallu Sénégal coalition. However, since Macky Sall has not been seen in Senagal since the end of his presidential term in April 2024, it has been speculated that he will not take his seat in the upcoming National Assembly, handing it over to his deputy. Following the announcement that Macky Sall would become the leader of the coalition, he announced that he would be stepping down as Special Envoy for the Paris Pact for People and the Planet (4P). He was appointed to the position by French President Emmanuel Macron in November 2023. 98-year-old former President Abdoulaye Wade also announced his support for the new coalition.

A few weeks before the parliamentary election, after the official publication of the lists, the Takku Wallu Sénégal coalition filed an appeal with the Constitutional Council to exclude Prime Minister of Senegal Ousmane Sonko, the leader of PASTEF, from the election, citing his disqualification from the 2024 presidential election, thereby declaring the ruling party's list invalid. However, the appeal was rejected by the Constitutional Council, which declared it "inadmissible".

== Ideology ==
According to the coalition leaders, its goal is "to restore governance away from amateurism, but also to preserve democratic achievements". According to MP Seydou Diouf, who read out the introductory text announcing the new coalition, Takku Wallu Sénégal "wants to work for the preservation of positive achievements with the achievements of Presidents Abdoulaye Wade and Macky Sall, but also to build together in a prospective approach, the new driving force towards the saving path".

== Composition ==
| Party | Abbr. | Leader | Ideology | Membership |
|---|---|---|---|---|
| Alliance for the Republic; Alliance pour la république | APR | Macky Sall | Economic liberalism Social conservatism | 2024–present |
| Senegalese Democratic Party; Parti démocratique sénégalais | PDS | Karim Wade | Liberalism; Economic liberalism | 2024–present |
| Rewmi | R | Idrissa Seck | Liberalism; Economic liberalism | 2024–present |
| Democratic Convergence "Bokk Gis Gis"; Convergence démocratique Bokk Gis Gis | BGG | Pape Diop | Liberalism; Economic liberalism | 2024–present |
| Union of Centrists of Senegal; Union des Centristes du Sénégal | UCS | Abdoulaye Baldé | Centrism; Liberalism | 2024–present |

== Election results ==
=== National Assembly elections ===
| Year | Leader | Votes | % | Seats | +/– | Rank | Status |
|---|---|---|---|---|---|---|---|
| 2024 | Macky Sall | 531,466 | 14.67% | 16 / 165 | New | 2nd | Opposition |
