= Habib Sy =

Senegalese politician

Habib Sy is a Senegalese politician, who had served as Director of the Cabinet of the President of Senegal Abdoulaye Wade. He has been a member of the government of Senegal since 2002.

In the mid-1990s, Sy was Director of the Cabinet of Minister of State Abdoulaye Wade during Wade's participation in the government. He then became an adviser at the Ministry of Trade and the Craft Industry in October 1998, a technical adviser at the Ministry of Trade in April 2000, and the General Administrator of Fondation Trade Point Sénégal in August 2000.

Entering the Senegalese government as Minister of Agriculture and Animal Husbandry on 6 November 2002, Sy's portfolio was modified in August 2003, when he was appointed as Minister of Agriculture and Hydraulics; he was then appointed as Minister of Agriculture, Animal Husbandry and Hydraulics in April 2004. Later in the year, he was promoted to the position of Minister of State for Agriculture and Hydraulics in November 2004, and he was moved to the position of Minister of State for Infrastructure, Equipment, Land Transport and Internal Maritime Transport in February 2006.

In the 3 June 2007 parliamentary election, Sy was elected to the National Assembly on a departmental list of the Sopi Coalition. In the government appointed after the election, on 19 June, Sy was retained in the government as Minister of State for Infrastructure, Urban Hydraulics and Sanitation. His portfolio was slightly reduced on 5 July 2007, when he was appointed as Minister of State for Infrastructure and Sanitation.

Sy subsequently served as Minister of the Civil Service before being appointed as Director of the Cabinet of the President of the Republic on 10 September 2009.

On March 21, 2024, Habib Sy withdrew from the 2024 presidential election, in favor of the candidacy of Bassirou Diomaye Faye.
