= 1957 Senegalese Territorial Assembly election =

- 31 March 1957

60 seats in the Territorial Assembly 31 seats needed for a majority
- Registered: 1,063,946
- Turnout: 55.04%
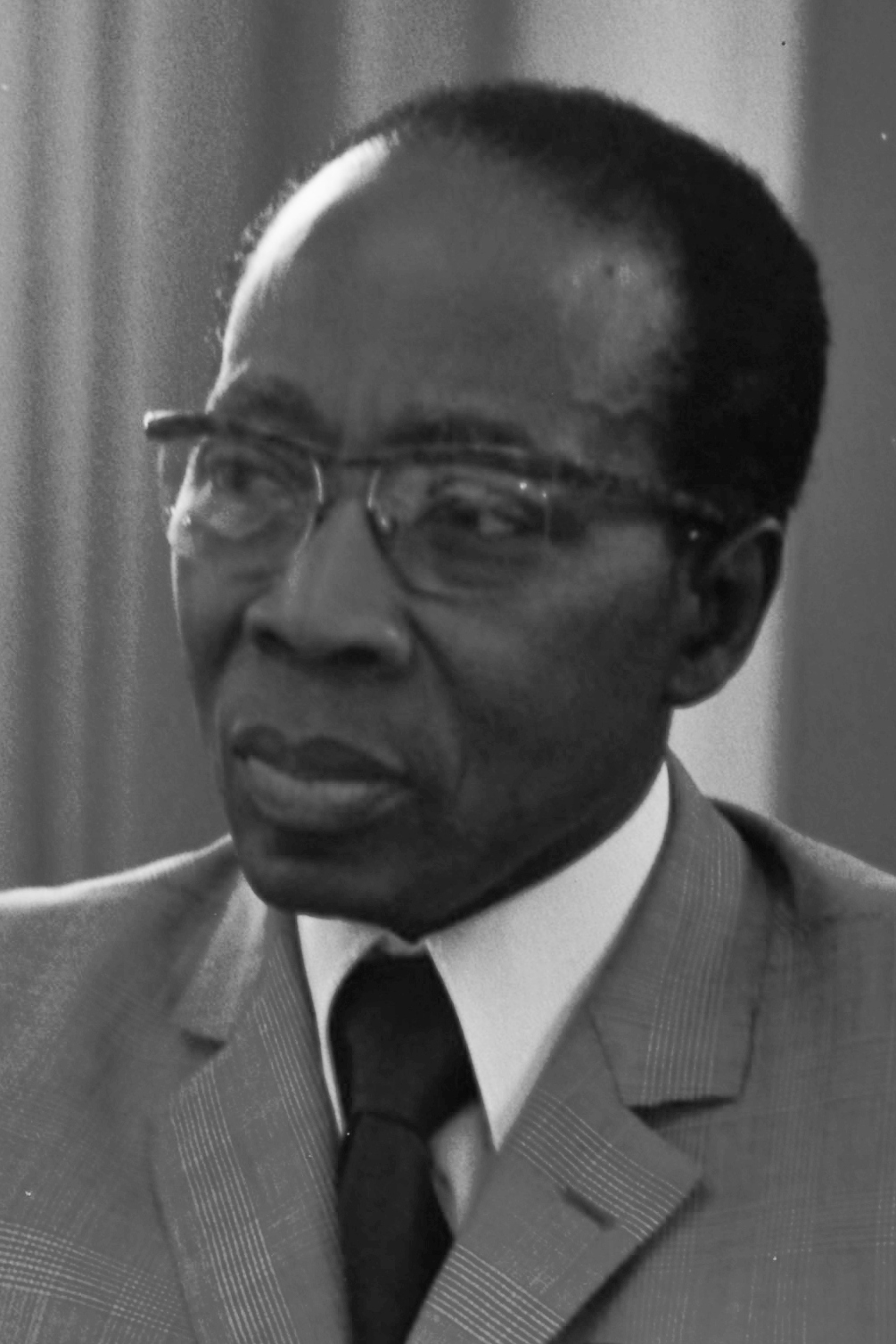

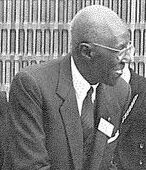
	Majority party	Minority party
Leader	Léopold Sédar Senghor	Lamine Guèye
Party	BPS	PSAS
Seats won	47	12
Popular vote	454,533	105,085
Percentage	78.25%	18.09%
- Results by constituency

Territorial Assembly elections were held in Senegal on 31 March 1957. The result was a landslide victory for the Senegalese Popular Bloc (BPS), which won 47 of the 60 seats. Its main competitor, the MSA-affiliated Senegalese Party of Socialist Action (PSAS) had aliented the marabouts and enabled the BPS to win the rural vote (over which the marabouts held an important sway) by far.

== Electoral system ==
The elections had been called after the adoption of the Loi Cadre in 1956, which instituted a system of semiautonomous governments in the different colonies of French West Africa.

== Campaign ==
Whilst most other Territorial Assembly elections were dominated by affiliates of the African Democratic Rally (RDA), the Senegalese elections saw a clash between the Senegalese parties affiliated to the African Convention (CA) and the African Socialist Movement (MSA) respectively.

The CA-affiliated BPS had evolved out of the Senegalese Democratic Bloc just before the elections. In the run-up to the elections the BPS leader Léopold Sédar Senghor had a more socialist and nationalist discourse, attracting various trade unionists and leftwing intellectuals to join the BPS leadership.

== Results ==
One MP from Kédougou was elected from one of the various regional lists that contested the polls. No women were elected to the assembly.

Party	Votes	%	Seats
Senegalese Popular Bloc	454,533	78.25	47
Senegalese Party of Socialist Action	105,085	18.09	12
Djoloff Democratic Bloc	6,159	1.06	0
Matam Cercel Progressive Bloc	5,827	1.00	0
Fouta Toro Democratic Bloc	3,720	0.64	0
Kédougou Democratic Bloc	2,227	0.38	1
United List for the Defense of the Interests of Lower Senegal	946	0.16	0
Workers and Peasants Bloc	791	0.14	0
Union for the Defense of the Interests of the Podor Cercle	383	0.07	0
Radical Party	40	0.01	0
Others	1,128	0.19	0
Total	580,839	100.00	60
Valid votes	580,839	99.19	
Invalid/blank votes	4,770	0.81	
Total votes	585,609	100.00	
Registered voters/turnout	1,063,946	55.04	
Source: Mackenzie, De Benoist

== Aftermath ==
After the elections, BPS selected Ibrahima Seydou N'Daw from Kaolack as the chair of the Assembly.
