= Walf TV =

- Country: Senegal

Programming
- Languages: French; Wolof

Ownership
- Owner: Walfadjri

History
- Launched: December 15, 2006; 19 years ago

Walf TV is a Senegalese private television station owned by Walfadjri. Created in 2006, it was the first local channel to use fully-digital equipment. In recent years, the channel has had constant problems with the regulators, and was suspended in periods from one week to one month.

== History ==
Walfadjri launched Walf TV at 5:10pm (Dakar time) on 15 December 2006. In order to cover both Europe and the United States, the channel broadcast on both Hotbird 7 and NSS-7 satellites. Initially, the channel broadcast from Paris and was a subscription service charging €110 per subscription and decoder. It eyed a tentative full launch on 31 January 2007 and hoped to deliver a visual radio service, using the resources of Walf Radio. After the satellite launch, it started broadcasting locally in Dakar one week later. Live programming only began on 27 April 2007. The total investment cost €500 million, representing FCFA 1 billion to pay for satellite location and FCFA 1,800 billion for acquiring material. As of the start of live broadcasts, it had 1,700 subscribers and had set a two-year goal to reach 100,000.

On 29 April 2009, Walf TV started broadcasting in France on Freebox TV's African package.

On 1 March 2017, the channel was added to Canal+ Afrique. An executive said that the inclusion was justified because it became one of the most popular channels in rural areas of Senegal.

On 1 June 2013, Minister of Communications, Telecommunications and Digital Economy Moussa Bocar Thiam announced the 30-day suspension of Walf TV after airing protests following opposition politician Ousmane Sonko's two-year sentence in jail. The decision could have led to a permanent revokation of its license.

On 4 February 2024, ahead of the then-upcoming presidential election, had its broadcasting license revoked after airing videos of protests On 11 February, the channel resumed operating.
