= Manko Taxawu Sénégal =

Political coalition in Senegal

The Manko Taxawu Sénégal (Wolof: "Coalition for the Revival of Senegal") is a group of several political parties organised to contest the 2017 Senegalese legislative elections. The coalition was originally intended to form a unified opposition list to challenge President Macky Sall's Benno Bokk Yakaar coalition, but negotiations among key opposition figures broke down over disputes on whether former President Abdoulaye Wade or imprisoned former Mayor of Dakar, Khalifa Sall, would head the list. Wade instead led his own coalition, Mako Wattu Senegal, into the election.

The coalition was organised and principally led by Khalifa Sall, who broke away from the Socialist Party, and former Prime Minister Idrissa Seck with his party Rewmi. The coalition came third in the 2017 parliamentary election, winning 7 seats. In 2020 following the COVID-19 pandemic outbreak Idrissa Seck and his party left the coalition to join back Macky Sall's presidential majority in the hope to work on a joint plan to fight the pandemic.

In September 2021 Taxawu Senegal joined Ousmane Sonko's Liberate the People alliance. During the following year the coalition contested first the 2022 local elections, performing well in several major cities including Khalifa Sall's victory in Dakar, and later the 2022 national election, gaining 56 seats and becoming the second biggest coalition in the National Assembly.

== Election results ==
=== Presidential elections ===
Election	Party candidate	Votes	%	Votes	%	Result
Election	Party candidate	First Round		Second Round		Result
2024	Khalifa Sall	69,760	1.56%	—		Lost ✗

=== National Assembly elections ===
Year	Leader	Votes	%	Seats	+/–	Rank	Status
2017	Khalifa Sall	388,188	11.73%	7 / 165	New	▲3rd	Opposition
2022 (Note: Run as part of the Liberate the People coalition.)	Khalifa Sall	1,071,139	32.85%	56 / 165	▲49	▲2nd	Opposition
2024 (Note: Run as part of the Sàmm Sa Kàddu coalition.)	Khalifa Sall	222,060	6.13%	3 / 165	▼53	▼4th	Opposition
