= 2022 Senegalese parliamentary election =

- 31 July 2022
- All 165 seats in the National Assembly; 83 seats needed for a majority
- Turnout: 46.60%
Party	Leader	Vote %	Seats
BBY	Aminata Touré	46.56	82
YAW	Ousmane Sonko	32.85	56
Wallu Sénégal	Abdoulaye Wade	14.46	24
LS/MPR	Pape Djibril Fall	1.73	1
AAR Sénégal	Thierno Alassane Sall	1.60	1
Bokk Gis Gis	Pape Diop	1.38	1
This lists parties that won seats. See the complete results below.
Prime Minister before	Prime Minister after
Vacant	Amadou Ba; BBY

Parliamentary elections were held in Senegal on 31 July 2022 to elect the 165 members of the National Assembly. President Macky Sall's United in Hope coalition remained the largest bloc in the National Assembly but lost its majority it had held since 2012.

== Electoral system ==
The 165 members of the National Assembly are elected by two methods; 112 are elected by either first-past-the-post or party bloc vote in single- or multi-member constituencies based on the 46 departments, with an additional 15 elected by overseas voters. The other 53 seats are elected from a nationwide constituency by proportional representation, with seats allocated initially using the simple quotient, with remaining seats allocated using the largest remainder method.

== Campaign ==
Ousmane Sonko was disqualified as a candidate by the Constitutional Council as a result of his arrest due to rape charges, leading to violent protests. Alongside Sonko, Khalifa Sall and Karim Wade were disqualified as candidates.

Aminata Touré of the APR called on Senegalese youth to vote for her party, citing Macky Sall's work for the country.

== Results ==
Polls opened at 8:00 GMT and closed at 18:00 GMT on 31 July 2022. Partial results were expected to be announced on 31 July, with the provisional overall results to be announced on 5 August 2022. Women won 64 of the 165 seats, in line with the requirement of the 2010 gender parity law on Senegalese elections.

Party	Votes	%	Seats		
Party	Votes	%	National	Departmental	Total
United in Hope	1,518,137	46.56	25	57	82
Liberate the People	1,071,139	32.85	17	39	56
Wallu Sénégal	471,517	14.46	8	16	24
The Servants / MPR	56,303	1.73	1	0	1
AAR Sénégal	52,173	1.60	1	0	1
Bokk Gis Gis	44,862	1.38	1	0	1
Naataangue Askan Wi	25,833	0.79	0	0	0
Bunt Bi	20,922	0.64	0	0	0
Total	3,260,886	100.00	53	112	165
Valid votes	3,260,886	99.44			
Invalid/blank votes	18,224	0.56			
Total votes	3,279,110	100.00			
Registered voters/turnout	7,036,466	46.60			
Source: Constitutional Council

== Aftermath ==
Both the Alliance for the Republic and the opposition Wallu Sénégal alongside Yewwi Askan Wi claimed victory on election night. Aminata Touré declared that the APR had won 30 of the country's 46 departments, giving them an "unquestionable majority" without stating the number of seats won by the party. Barthélémy Dias, mayor of Dakar and member of Yewwi Askan Wi immediately disputed Touré's claims, stating "You lost this election at the national level. We will not accept it. This abuse will not pass". However on 11 August both main opposition coalitions announced that they would not appeal the results, but would keep opposing Macky Sall from inside the National Assembly. Despite none of the coalitions obtaining a majority of the seats, an agreement over the formation of a new government was reached when Bokk Gis Gis' only elected member, Pape Diop, decided to support Macky Sall, giving the presidential block a one-seat majority. However, on 25 September Aminata Touré announced she would no longer sit with BBY in the Assembly, accusing President Sall of promoting Amadou Mame Diop as president of the National Assembly due to "familial ties", resulting in the government losing its majority in the chamber.
