= Alliance of the Forces of Progress (Senegal) =

Political party in Senegal

- Leader: Moustapha Niasse
- Founder: Moustapha Niasse
- Founded: 13 August 1999
- Split from: Socialist Party
- Headquarters: Dakar
- Ideology: Social democracy
- Political position: Centre-left
- National affiliation: Jàmm ak Njariñ

Website
- http://www.afp-senegal.org/

The Alliance of the Forces of Progress (French: Alliance des forces de progrès) is a political party in Senegal.

In the parliamentary election held on 29 April 2001, the party won 16.1% of the popular vote and 11 out of 120 seats. The party's founder, Moustapha Niasse, won 16.8% of the vote in the 2000 presidential election, coming in third place. Along with most other opposition parties, the AFP boycotted the parliamentary election of 3 June 2007.

In the 2017 parliamentary elections, the party fought the election as part of the Benno Bokk Yakaar coalition, supporting President Macky Sall. The coalition won 125 seats, including a seat for Moustapha Niasse.

== Electoral history ==
=== Presidential elections ===
Election	Party candidate	First Round		Second Round		Result
Election	Party candidate	Votes	%	Votes	%	Result
2000	Moustapha Niasse	280,538	16.77%	—N/a		Lost ✗
2007	Moustapha Niasse	203,129	5.93%	—N/a		Lost ✗
2012	Moustapha Niasse	357,330	13.20%	—N/a		Lost ✗

=== National Assembly elections ===
Election	Leader	Votes	%	Seats	+/–	Position	Status
2001	Moustapha Niasse	303,150	16.13%	11 / 120	New	▲2nd	Opposition
2007	Election boycotted			0 / 120	▼11	—N/a	Extra-parliamentary
2012 (Note: Run within United in Hope coalition.)	Moustapha Niasse	1,040,899	53.06%	119 / 150	▲119	▲1st	Coalition (United in Hope)
2017	Moustapha Niasse	1,637,761	49.47%	125 / 165	▲26	1st	Coalition (United in Hope)
2022	Moustapha Niasse	1,518,137	46.56%	82 / 165	▼43	1st	Coalition (United in Hope)
2024 (Note: Run as part of the Jàmm ak Njariñ coalition.)	Moustapha Niasse	330,865	9.13%	7 / 165	▼75	▼3rd	Opposition
