= Rewmi =

Senegalese political party

- Leader: Idrissa Seck
- Founder: Idrissa Seck
- Founded: 2 October 2012
- Split from: Senegalese Democratic Party
- Headquarters: Dakar, Senegal
- Ideology: Liberalism; Economic liberalism
- Political position: Centre
- National affiliation: Takku Wallu Sénégal
- Continental affiliation: Africa Liberal Network
- International affiliation: Liberal International
- National Assembly: 0 / 165

Rewmi (lit. 'country' or 'nation' in Wolof) is a political party in Senegal. It is led by Idrissa Seck, after he founded it in 2006.

== History ==
The party boycotted the June 2007 parliamentary election. Idrissa Seck run in the 2012 presidential election but finished fifth and decided to endorse Macky Sall for the second round. Following that, the party joined Macky Sall's United in Hope coalition for the 2012 election, that resulted in the coalition winning a majority of the seats. However just a year later the national secretariat of the party unanimously decided to quit the alliance over several disagreements between Idrissa Seck and Macky Sall.

in 2019 Idrissa Seck contested for the third time the presidential election as main opponent of Macky Sall, and finished second with 20.51% of the votes, its best performance up to that moment. Following the outbreak of the COVID-19 pandemic, with Senegal registering its first case on 2 March 2020, Idrisa Seck started talks with other opposition forces and Macky Sall in order to find a common plan to face the pandemic. This culminated with Idrissa Seck being nominated president of the Economic, Social and Environmental Council on 1 November 2020 and Rewmi officially joining the government with two of his members being assigned ministerial positions, putting an end to the conflict between Idrissa Seck and Macky Sall.

Rewmi contested both the 2022 local elections and the 2022 national election back as member of the United in Hope coalition, but registered defeats in its historic stronghold of Thiés leaving Idrissa Seck in a weakened position and possibly close to withdrawing from political life. Idrissa Seck stood again in the 2024 Senegalese presidential election.

== Election results ==
=== Presidential elections ===
Election	Candidate	First Round		Second Round		Result
Election	Candidate	Votes	%	Votes	%	Result
2007	Idrissa Seck	510,922	14.92%	—N/a		Lost ✗
2012	Idrissa Seck	212,853	7.86%	—N/a		Lost ✗
2019	Idrissa Seck	899,556	20.51%	—N/a		Lost ✗
2024	Idrissa Seck	40,286	0.90%	—N/a		Lost ✗

=== National Assembly elections ===
Election	Party leader	Votes	%	Seats	+/–	Position	Status
2012 (Note: Run within United in Hope coalition.)	Idrissa Seck	1,040,899	53.06%	119 / 150	New	▲1st	Coalition
2017 (Note: Run within Manko Taxawu Sénégal coalition.)	Idrissa Seck	388,188	11.73%	7 / 165	▼112	▼3rd	Opposition 2017-20
2017	Idrissa Seck	388,188	11.73%	7 / 165	▼112	▼3rd	Coalition 2020-22
2022	Idrissa Seck	1,518,137	46.56%	82 / 165	▲75	▲1st	Coalition
2024 (Note: Run as part of the Takku Wallu Sénégal coalition.)	Idrissa Seck	531,466	14.67%	16 / 165	▼66	▼2nd	Opposition
