= Farlu =

Political party in Senegal

- Abbreviation: Farlu
- Leader: Moustapha Diop
- Colors: Blue
- National Assembly: 1 / 165

Farlu is a Senegalese political party led by Moustapha Diop.

== History ==
The party won one seat in the National Assembly at the 2024 Senegalese parliamentary election.

== Election results ==
Year	Leader	Votes	%	Seats	+/–	Rank	Status
2024	Moustapha Diop	28,303	0.78%	1 / 165	▲	▲6th	Opposition

== See also ==
- List of political parties in Senegal
