= Sénégaal Kese =

Political party in Senegal

- Abbreviation: SK
- Leader: Thierno Alassane Sall
- Colors: Blue
- National Assembly: 1 / 165

Sénégaal Kese (SK) is a Senegalese political party led by Thierno Alassane Sall.

== History ==
The party won one seat in the National Assembly at the 2024 Senegalese parliamentary election.

== Election results ==
Year	Leader	Votes	%	Seats	+/–	Rank	Status
2024	Thierno Alassane Sall	26,775	0.74%	1 / 165	▲	▲8th	Opposition

== See also ==
- List of political parties in Senegal
