= Bokk Gis Gis =

Political party in Senegal

Bokk Gis Gis (lit. 'Shared Vision' or 'Common Vision'), officially the Convergence démocratique Bokk Gis Gis, is a political party in Senegal, led by Pape Diop. It was principally made up of former members of the Senegalese Democratic Party, led by then-President Abdoulaye Wade, and won 4 seats in the 2012 parliamentary election. In 2017, the party rejoined Wade's coalition, Wattu Senegal, and Pape Diop won the party's lone seat in the 2017 parliamentary election. Following the 2022 parliamentary election Pape Diop was again elected as only MP for the party and he decided to support Macky Sall after its United in Hope coalition fell one seat short of majority to facilitate the formation of a new government.

== Election results ==
=== National Assembly elections ===
Election	Party leader	Votes	%	Seats	+/–	Position	Outcome
2012	Pape Diop	143,180	7.30%	4 / 150		3rd	Opposition
2017 (Note: Run within Manko Wattu Sénégal coalition.)	Pape Diop	552,095	16.68%	19 / 165	▲15	▲2nd	Opposition
2022	Pape Diop	44,862	1.38%	1 / 165	▼18	▼6th	Support
2024 (Note: Run as part of the Takku Wallu Sénégal coalition.)	Pape Diop	531,466	14.67%	16 / 165	▲15	▲2nd	Opposition
