= Sopi Senegal =

Political party in Senegal

- Abbreviation: Sopi
- Leader: Tafsir Thioye
- Colors: Gold
- National Assembly: 1 / 165

Sopi Senegal is a Senegalese political party led by Tafsir Thioye.

== History ==
The party won one seat in the National Assembly at the 2024 Senegalese parliamentary election.

== Election results ==
Year	Leader	Votes	%	Seats	+/–	Rank	Status
2024	Tafsir Thioye	22,991	0.63%	1 / 165	▲	▲9th	Opposition

== See also ==
- List of political parties in Senegal
