= The March of the Territories / Andu Nawlé =

Political party in Senegal

- Abbreviation: LMDT/AN
- Leader: Maguette Séne
- Colors: Blue
- National Assembly: 2 / 165

The March of the Territories / Andu Nawlé is a Senegalese political party led by Maguette Séne, the mayor of Malicounda.

== History ==
The party won two seats in the National Assembly at the 2024 Senegalese parliamentary election.

== Election results ==
Year	Leader	Votes	%	Seats	+/–	Rank	Status
2024	Maguette Séne	47,636	1.31%	2 / 165	▲	▲5th	Opposition

== See also ==
- List of political parties in Senegal
