= Barthélémy Dias =

Senegalese politician

Mayor of Dakar
- In office February 17, 2022 – December 13, 2024
- Preceded by: Soham El Wardini
- Succeeded by: Abass Fall

Member of the Senegalese National Assembly
- In office September 12, 2022 – December 9, 2024
- In office January 7, 2012 – October 10, 2016

Mayor of Mermoz-Sacré-Cœur
- In office March 22, 2009 – February 17, 2022
- Preceded by: Sokhna Thiam
- Succeeded by: Alioune Tall

Personal details
- Born: Barthélémy Toye Dias; September 23, 1975 (age 51) Dakar, Senegal

Barthélémy Toye Dias (born September 23, 1975) is a Senegalese politician who was the 23rd Mayor of Dakar from 2022 to 2024. Barthélémy previously served as the Mayor of Mermoz-Sacre-Coeur, from 2009 to 2022, and served as a member of the Senegalese National Assembly twice, from 2012 to 2016 and then again from 2022 to 2024.

== Early life and education ==
Dias was born on September 23, 1975 to a family of Cap Verdean descent in the Sicap Baobab neighborhood of Dakar, Senegal. His father, Jean-Paul Dias, was a leading member of the Senegalese Democratic Party and served in a multitude of roles in the government of former President Abdoulaye Wade. His mother, Christiane Lopes, was the captain of the Senegal women's national basketball team that won gold at the 1973 All-Africa Games. Following her sports career she served as the Head Administrator of John F. Kennedy Secondary School in Dakar and an advisor to the Senegalese Ministry of Education.

Barthélémy was raised Catholic and attended various Private Catholic schools throughout Dakar. He graduated with an MBA specializing in Transportation.

== Career ==
=== Beginnings (2005–2008) ===
Barthélémy began his political career in 2005 with the Socialist Party of Senegal, led by Ousmane Tanor Dieng. He becomes a member of the Central Committee within the party and was appointed as the Secretary General of the National Socialist Youth Movement.

In August 2006, he was arrested, alongside his father, and transported to Tambacounda. The grounds for his arrest were believed to be politically motivated and this led to a popular outcry for his release.

=== Mayor of Mermoz-Sacre-Coeur (2009–2022) ===
In 2009, he was elected as the Mayor of Mermoz-Sacre-Coeur as a member of the opposition coalition United to Boost Senegal. He was once again elected in 2014 and then for a third and final time in 2022. However, having also won the mayoral election for the City of Dakar, he resigns in accordance with the General Code of Local Authorities.

In 2012, as part of the coalition United in Hope (BBY), led by Macky Sall. Barthélémy was included on the national list for the legislative elections and was elected as a member of the National Assembly (Senegal). During his mandate, he was elected Secretary to the Office of the National Assembly, appointed member of the Committee of Foreign Affairs, the African Union and Senegalese Abroad, appointed member of the Committee on Law, Decentralization, Labor and Human Rights and appointed member of the Committee of General Economy and Finance.

In 2017, his close friend and mentor, Khalifa Sall, was accused and convicted of embezzlement of public funds. Believing that this conviction was politically motivated by the regime in power, to make the popular Sall ineligible for the upcoming presidential elections, Barthélémy leaves BBY and joins the growing opposition. Following this decision he was kicked out of the Socialist Party.

=== Mayor of Dakar (2022–2024) ===
In 2022, in preparation for the local elections, Khalifa Sall, Ousmane Sonko and Dias unite and form the Liberate the People (YAW) coalition. Barthélémy was named as the coalition's mayoral candidate for the city of Dakar in the 2022 Senegalese local elections. He wins the election with a total of 173,628 votes and officially installed on February 17, 2022. During the same election cycle, Barthélémy was also named head of the YAW coalition legislative list for the Dakar department and was elected as a member of the National Assembly, for a second time.

In 2024, after having left the YAW coalition, Barthélémy leads the Sàmm Sa Kàddu coalition in the 2024 Senegalese parliamentary election following the early dissolution of the previous National Assembly by President Bassirou Diomaye Faye. Dias was once again elected to the National Assembly but did not serve as he was removed from the assembly due to his conviction in the Ndiaga Diouf case.

That same year the Senegalese government announced they also want to remove Barthélémy from his office of Mayor, something many deemed unconstitutional. On December 13, 2024, the Prefect of the Department of Dakar striped him of his position. On December 16, 2024, Dias filed two appeals against this decision, one before the Appellate Court of Dakar and a second before the Administrative Chamber of the Supreme Court of Senegal. His appeal before the Appellate Court of Dakar was rejected the very next month in January 2025.

=== Senegal Bi Nu Bokk (2025-Present) ===
In 2025, it was announced at a Manko Taxawu Sénégal press conference, that Barthélémy Dias and Khalifa Sall would go their separate ways following and amicable split. On May 27, 2025, at a press conference of his own, Barthélémy Dias announced the creation of his own political party Senegal Bi Nu Bokk.

== Legal issues ==
=== First arrest ===
On August 12, 2006, following the arrest of his father, the DIC summoned Barthélémy Dias and questioned him before placing him in detention with convicted prisoners. RADDHO, a prominent local human rights organization, sought access to check on his wellbeing, but was denied. On August 14, 2006, Barthélémy Dias was formally charged with spreading false news, slander, and threats against a judicial official. On August 16, the police searched his home without a warrant and seized Barthélémy Dias' foreign passport and a weapons permit. On August 22, he received a six-month prison sentence, he was pardoned and released 2 months later.

=== The Ndiaga Diouf Case ===
On December 22, 2011, a group of a dozen men, in unmarked four-wheel pick up trucks, gathered and surrounded the Mermoz-Sacre-Coeur town hall. A fight broke out and shots were fired leaving one man dead, Ndiaga Diouf. Dias was detained on suspicion of involvement and charged with assault and battery, murder and illegal possession of a firearm. Barthélémy invoked self-defense stating, "The road leading to my home was blocked. I couldn't escape or return to my town hall. I fought for my life". In 2017, following six years of drawn out court proceedings, he was sentenced to two years, 6 months of which had to be served in prison.

=== Condemnation of judges ===
In March 2018, following the controversial conviction of his mentor Khalifa Sall, Dias gave a radio interview where he publicly condemned the conviction. Immediately after the interview he was once again arrested, by masked men in unidentifiable clothes, and charged with contempt and inciting public disorder, for which he was sentenced to 6 months in jail. However, after his conviction he was released for time served.
