= And Beesal Sénégal =

Political party in Senegal

- Abbreviation: ABS
- Leader: Abdoulaye Sylla
- Colors: Brown
- National Assembly: 1 / 165

And Beesal Senegal (ABS) is a Senegalese political party led by Abdoulaye Sylla.

== History ==
The party won one seat in the National Assembly at the 2024 Senegalese parliamentary election.

== Election results ==
Year	Leader	Votes	%	Seats	+/–	Rank	Status
2024	Abdoulaye Sylla	20,765	0.57*	1 / 165	▲	▲11th	Opposition

== See also ==
- List of political parties in Senegal
