= 2024 Senegalese presidential election =

- 24 March 2024
- Turnout: 61.30%
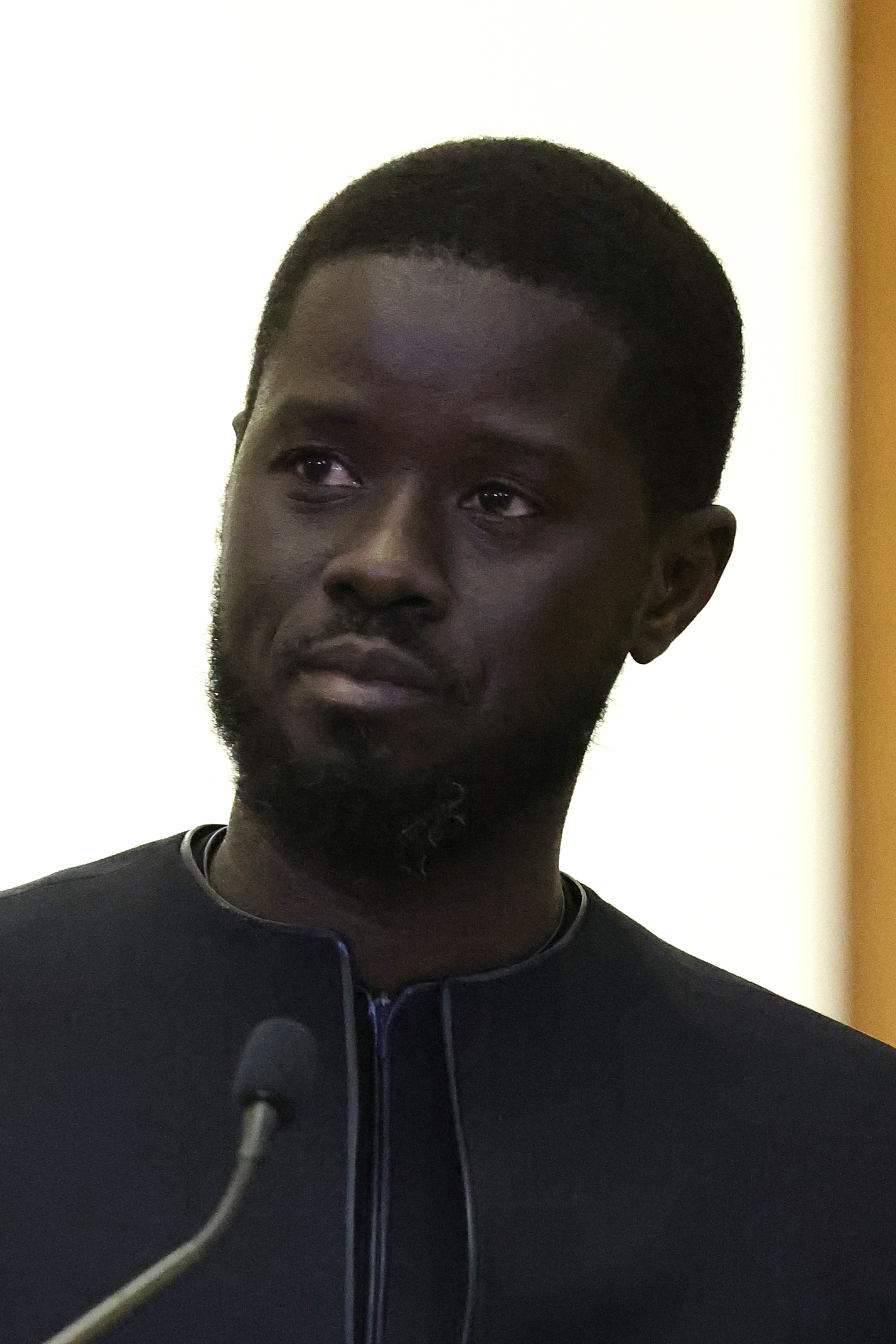

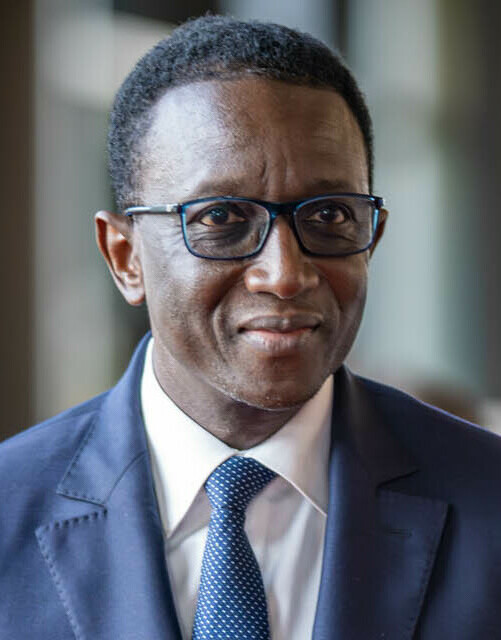
Candidate	Bassirou Diomaye Faye	Amadou Ba
Party	PASTEF	APR
Alliance	DP	BBY
Popular vote	2,434,751	1,605,086
Percentage	54.28%	35.79%
- Results by department Faye: 40–50% 50–60% 60–70% 70–80% 80–90% Ba: 40–50% 50–60% 60–70% 70–80% 80–90% Dia: 40–50%
President before election
Macky Sall
APR
Elected President
Bassirou Diomaye Faye
PASTEF

Presidential elections were held in Senegal on 24 March 2024. Incumbent president Macky Sall was ineligible to pursue a third term due to term limits in the Constitution of Senegal.

The elections were originally scheduled for 25 February, but were postponed indefinitely by a decree of Sall on 3 February, and then delayed by the National Assembly to 15 December. However, on 15 February the Senegalese Constitutional Council overturned the postponement and ordered elections to proceed as soon as possible, with the government subsequently setting a new election date for 24 March after a national dialogue at the end of February was ruled unconstitutional.

Bassirou Diomaye Faye, running in place of Ousmane Sonko, was elected president with 54% of the vote, while Amadou Ba, the candidate of the ruling United in Hope (BBY) coalition, peacefully conceded defeat. Faye's victory was later confirmed by Senegal's Supreme Court. He was inaugurated as president on 2 April.

== Background ==
Several parties had announced their intent to run for office in 2024, but they first had to receive sufficient support from the general public to pass the sponsorship stage. Any presidential candidate must receive between 0.8 percent and 1 percent of the electorate's signatures. These signatures must be collected with at least 2,000 sponsorships in each of the seven of Senegal's fourteen regions. Candidates can also have the option of receiving sponsorships from at least 13 members of the National Assembly, or 120 mayors and heads of regional councils. A deposit of 30 million CFA francs must also be paid by candidates at the Caisse des dépôts et consignations.

On 17 February 2023, the day before the date was revealed for the upcoming elections, Senegalese opposition candidate Ousmane Sonko was forcibly taken from his vehicle amid rallies outside a Dakar courthouse where his trial was taking place. Sonko was in court as part of a civil lawsuit against him by Senegal's tourism minister for defamation and public insults.

On 3 July, following a series of protests regarding Sonko's conviction for "immoral behaviour" in a separate case, incumbent president Macky Sall stated that he would not seek re-election for a third term.

Registrations for candidacy opened in October 2023 and ended on 26 December 2023. Pre-campaigning began on 5 January 2024 while the campaign period was set to start on 4 February, with the first round taking place on 25 February.

== Candidates ==
On 14 July, Ousmane Sonko was announced as the presidential candidate for PASTEF. Sonko's eligibility as a candidate was unclear due to him receiving a two-year prison sentence in June 2023, rendering him ineligible to run according to some legal experts; although it was noted he had not exhausted his appeals to the Supreme Court, which could reverse his sentence. On 31 July, PASTEF was ordered dissolved by the Senegalese government, while Sonko undertook a months-long hunger strike in protest over the political situation.

In September, Sall nominated Prime Minister Amadou Ba as candidate for the ruling Alliance for the Republic.

On 19 November, PASTEF designated its secretary-general Bassirou Diomaye Faye as their candidate for the election. Faye had been imprisoned since April 2023, when he was arrested for criticising the conduct of Sonko's defamation trial on social media. In December, a court ordered Sonko's reinstatement to the voters' list and allowed him to file his candidacy.

A total of 93 people registered to run for president before the Senegalese Constitutional Council. The list of candidates was narrowed down as the body examined the sponsorship of would-be candidates until 10 January 2024 before moving on to scrutinize other relevant documents. Many candidates were rejected due to missing documents, insufficient sponsors or sponsors supporting more than one candidate, including former prime ministers Aminata Toure and Cheikh Hadjibou Soumaré, as well as Macky Sall's brother-in-law Adama Faye. This prompted Toure and 27 other candidates to collectively criticise the sponsorship control system.

In January 2024, candidate Thierno Alassane Sall filed a complaint against fellow candidate Karim Wade being of dual French-Senegalese nationality. Wade, a former minister and the son of former president Abdoulaye Wade, subsequently renounced his French citizenship. At the same time, the National Assembly created a commission of inquiry responsible for monitoring the electoral process.

On 20 January, the Senegalese Constitutional Council published the final list of candidates for the presidential election. It was made up of 20 candidates including Amadou Ba, former prime ministers Idrissa Seck and Mahammed Boun Abdallah Dionne, former interior minister Aly Ngouille Ndiaye, the former mayor of Dakar Khalifa Sall, the mayor of Kolda, Mame Boye Diao, and Bassirou Diomaye Faye, who was in prison pending a trial. Two women were also cleared to run, namely gynaecologist Rose Wardini and entrepreneur Anta Babacar Ngom, the head of one of the country's largest food manufacturers and poultry firms, Sedima. Both are the first women to run for president since 2012.

The candidacies of Ousmane Sonko and Karim Wade were not validated, with the council citing Sonko's six-month suspended sentence for defamation that was upheld by the Senegalese Supreme Court on 4 January and Wade's renunciation of his French citizenship being "not retroactive" and his sworn declaration of the renunciation being "inexact". Wade's exclusion prompted the 25 MPs of his Senegalese Democratic Party to call for an inquiry in the National Assembly over Wade's and other candidates' exclusion, which lasted until 18 February, when it was ended by the Senegalese government, citing the opening of a judicial investigation over the matter.

On 28 January, Sonko released a video on social media formally recognizing Bassirou Diomaye Faye as his replacement in the election.

On 19 February, Rose Wardini renounced her candidacy following controversy over her dual Franco-Senegalese nationality.

== Postponement ==
On 3 February, hours before campaigning was about to start, President Macky Sall ordered the indefinite postponement of the election, citing a parliamentary investigation into two judges of the Constitutional Court over their integrity with regards to the electoral process that was launched following Karim Wade's exclusion from the elections and warning of adverse effects on the "credibility of the election by creating the seeds of pre- and post-electoral litigation". Sall also claimed that some of the official candidates held dual citizenship. This was the first postponement of a presidential election in the country's history.

The postponement was welcomed by Wade's Democratic Party, which requested the postponement, while candidates Thierno Alassane Sall, who called the postponement "high treason," Khalifa Sall and Déthié Fall announced that they would start their campaign as originally scheduled, while candidate Habib Sy said that all opposition candidates had agreed to launch their campaigns together as scheduled. Rejected candidate Aminata Touré called the decision "sabotage". Abdou Latif Coulibaly, the Secretary General of Sall's government and its concurrent spokesman, announced his resignation, saying that he wanted to have "full and complete freedom" to defend his political convictions.

On 4 February, police in Dakar fired tear gas to disperse demonstrators protesting against the postponement and arrested Aminata Touré and candidate Anta Babacar Ngom, who had attended one of the rallies after all 19 opposition candidates called for supporters to gather in the streets, including at a major roundabout and in front of the National Assembly. Authorities also suspended and later revoked the broadcasting license of the private television channel Walf TV for its coverage of the protests, calling it an "incitement to violence". Protesters were seen chanting "Macky Sall, dictator!" and establishing makeshift barricades, burning tyres and throwing rocks at police. The Ministry of Communication, Telecommunications and Digital Economy shut off mobile internet access on 5 February, citing "the dissemination of several hateful and subversive messages relayed on social networks in the context of threats and disturbances to public order." Three people were killed during protests against the postponement in Saint-Louis, Dakar and Ziguinchor. Protests were also held in Diourbel.

In a heated session on 5 February that saw some opposition deputies removed by security forces after they tried to block proceedings, the National Assembly voted in favor of a proposal to postpone the elections until 15 December formally. The measure, which needed the support of at least three-fifths (99) of the chamber's 165 deputies to pass, was approved by 105 members and rejected by only one MP and prompted renewed protests outside the National Assembly that were suppressed by police using tear gas. Two opposition parties subsequently filed an appeal to the Constitutional Council urging it to direct "the continuation of the electoral process." Fourteen opposition candidates also filed an appeal to the council, with two others pledging to challenge the postponement in court. Three lawmakers who were affiliated with PASTEF were briefly arrested on 6 February.

In response to the postponement and subsequent protests, former presidents Abdou Diouf and Abdoulaye Wade called on Macky Sall to organise the "national dialogue he has announced, without delay." They also called on protesters to "immediately end the violence."

=== International reactions ===
The French foreign ministry called on Senegalese authorities "to end the uncertainty about the electoral calendar so the vote can be held as soon as possible." The US State Department also urged "all participants in (the) electoral process to engage peacefully to swiftly set a new date and the conditions for a timely, free and fair election". US Senate Foreign Relations Committee chair Ben Cardin said the postponement put Senegal "on a dangerous path towards dictatorship, and must not be allowed to stand."

ECOWAS called on authorities to "expedite the various processes to set a new date for the elections", while African Union commission chair Moussa Faki Mahamat urged a resolution of the political crisis "through consultation, understanding and dialogue" and called on authorities to "organise the elections as quickly as possible, in transparency, in peace and national harmony". The European Union also said the postponement had opened a "period of uncertainty" and called "for the staging of a transparent, inclusive and credible election as soon as possible." United Nations Human Rights Office spokesperson Liz Throssell said any decision to postpone the elections should be "based on broad-based consultations." On 8 February, foreign ministers of ECOWAS member states held an emergency session in Abuja, Nigeria, to discuss the situation in Senegal. On 12 February, an ECOWAS delegation arrived in the country to attempt to help mediate.

The Committee to Protect Journalists condemned the Senegalese government's shutdown of Walf TV.

== Overturning of postponement and resumption of elections ==
On 15 February, the Senegalese Constitutional Council ruled that the decision to postpone and reschedule the election by Macky Sall and the National Assembly was "contrary to the constitution" and ordered its cancellation. However, it also acknowledged that holding the election as originally scheduled on 25 February was no longer feasible, and urged the government to act immediately. In response, presidential spokesperson Yoro Dia said that Sall would comply with the decision, but did not give a new date for it to be held. In a televised interview on 22 February, Sall said that he would leave office as scheduled on 2 April, but said that he would hold talks first with political leaders to determine a new timetable for the elections. He also expressed his willingness to release Ousmane Sonko and his supporters as an act of good faith. His proposal for a dialogue was rejected on 23 February by the Aar Sunu Election (Protect Our Election) collective composed of 40 civil society groups, which called it "unacceptable" and an "attempt at diversion".

During the week that the postponement was overturned, several hundred political prisoners were released by the government. At a protest in Dakar on 17 February, opposition candidate Malick Gakou called for the election to be held in March to ensure the departure of Macky Sall from the presidency as previously scheduled on 2 April. A total of 15 candidates have called for elections to be held before 2 April. On the original date of the elections on 25 February, candidates held a mock vote with them slipping ballot papers into a box bearing the words "RIP 25 February." In the end of February, the government tabled an amnesty bill to calm the social and political climate.

During a national dialogue in Diamniadio that was boycotted by the opposition and was attended only by Amadou Ba and another candidate on 26 February, Macky Sall announced that elections would be held before the start of the rainy season in July, and reiterated his commitment to leave office as scheduled in April. In response, Aar Sunu Election, which also boycotted the proceedings, called for a general strike on 27 February. On the second and final day of the national dialogue on 27 February, a panel composed of civil, political and religious leaders proposed holding the presidential elections on 2 June, and recommended a review of the disqualification of Karim Wade and other presidential candidates.

On 6 March, the government set the first round of the elections on 24 March after the constitutional court ruled the national dialogue was unconstitutional. Macky Sall dismissed Amadou Ba as prime minister to allow him to focus on his election campaign and replaced him with Interior Minister Sidiki Kaba. The Constitutional Council approved of the new date on 7 March. On 14 March, days before the election, Sonko and Faye were released from prison, following the passage of the amnesty bill, granting them a few days of campaigning.

In an interview with the BBC on 20 March, Macky Sall rejected responsibility for the political crisis caused by his decision to postpone the election, saying "I don't owe any apology, I abided by the law".

== Campaign ==
Campaigning began on 9 March and ended on 22 March, but was complicated by it occurring during Ramadan, during which many activities were shut down for the day. This forced some candidates to resort to online strategies.

The election took place amid several socioeconomic affecting Senegal, such as high unemployment among the youth, increases in the cost of living, and questions over the management of domestic oil and gas production which is expected to begin in 2024.

Bassirou Diomaye Faye campaigned on creating jobs, taking a strong stance against corruption, and vowing to reexamine energy contracts. He ran under the slogan "Diomaye mooy Ousmane", which means "Diomaye is Ousmane" in Wolof, and expressed hope that Sonko's charisma and popular appeal amongst Senegal's youth would boost his campaign. Faye's program is similar with Sonko's for 2019. Faye announced his intentions to implement a monetary reform to finance the economy of Senegal, removing the CFA franc as the country's currency. In his program, he states that he would "carry out a monetary reform that will allow our country to have its own currency", however he added that "the creation of a currency requires the respect of the stages of the process". He added in a press conference that he believed that there was "no sovereignty if there is no monetary sovereignty." After concern from foreign investors, in March he said that he would implement "monetary reform at the sub-regional level first", before considering to create a national currency. He also supported extending the fishing zone exclusive for local fishermen by 20 kilometers to offset losses from foreign fishing fleets. During the campaign, Faye released a declaration of his assets and called on other candidates to follow suit.

Amadou Ba said that he sought to represent continuity and stability. He vowed to continue the legacy of Macky Sall with a positive investment climate and said that a vote for him was a vote for "greater peace and prosperity". He criticized Faye and Sonko saying their proposals were radical and labeled them as "bandits"'. He argued his ministerial track record proved he would oversee development and create one million jobs in five years.

Khalifa Sall ran on a platform of sustainable development, particularly on responsible water management and equitable land distribution. Mahammed Boun Abdallah Dionne ran on a platform focusing on Senegal's "economic sovereignty". However, Dionne fell ill during the campaign and was hospitalized in Paris, where he later died on 5 April. Anta Babacar Ngom meanwhile called for the strengthening of the private sector, free healthcare and reformation of the education system, including increased recognition for indigenous languages.

On 15 March, a day after Faye's release from jail, he gathered hundreds of supporters at his first public appearance as a presidential contender. Former president Abdoulaye Wade and his Senegalese Democratic Party (PDS) endorsed Faye on the same day, following the disqualification of his son Karim Wade. Cheikh Tidiane Dieye, another candidate in the presidential election, withdrew in favor of Faye. Former prime minister Aminata Touré, who had a public falling out with Macky Sall and left the ruling coalition in 2023, also backed Faye.

== Conduct ==
On 23 March, the electoral observation mission of the Economic Community of Central African States (CEMAC) called for an "inclusive and incident-free presidential vote".

Five hundred observers were stationed at polling offices around the country and another 500 traveled between sites to monitor the vote. Their mission was to make sure voting opens on time and whether candidates were present at the count, as well as watching for any interference or irregularities. A coalition of Senegalese civil society groups, known collectively as Cosce, was also involved in the observation mission.

Shortly after polling closed, a visiting government delegation in Saint-Louis was pelted with stones after entering a closed polling station.

Malin Björk, who headed a group of 100 observers from the European Union that monitored 40 polling stations across the country, said that the vote "took place in a calm environment and was well-organized."

An ECOWAS monitoring team sent to the country said that the election was conducted "smoothly".

== Results ==
Candidate	Party	Votes	%
Bassirou Diomaye Faye	PASTEF	2,434,751	54.28
Amadou Ba	Alliance for the Republic	1,605,086	35.79
Aliou Mamadou Dia	Party for Unity and Rally	125,690	2.80
Khalifa Sall	Manko Taxawu Sénégal	69,760	1.56
Idrissa Seck	Rewmi	40,286	0.90
Thierno Alassane Sall	Republic of Values	25,946	0.58
Boubacar Camara	Party of Construction and Solidarity	23,359	0.52
Aly Ngouille Ndiaye	Independent	20,964	0.47
Papa Djibril Fall	The Servants / MPR	18,304	0.41
Serigne Mboup	Independent	16,049	0.36
Déthié Fall	Republican Party for Progress	15,836	0.35
Daouda Ndiaye	Independent	15,895	0.35
Anta Babacar Ngom	Alternative for the Next Generation of Citizens	15,457	0.34
Cheikh Tidiane Dieye	Independent	15,172	0.34
Mamadou Diao	Independent	14,591	0.33
Mamadou Lamine Diallo	National Patriotic Union/Tekki	9,998	0.22
Mahammed Dionne	Independent	8,435	0.19
Malick Gakou	Grand Party	6,343	0.14
Habib Sy	Independent	3,206	0.07
Total		4,485,128	100.00
Valid votes		4,485,128	99.24
Invalid/blank votes		34,125	0.76
Total votes		4,519,253	100.00
Registered voters/turnout		7,371,890	61.30
Source: Conseil constitutionnel

== Reactions ==
=== Domestic ===
Official results were released and validated by the constitutional court on 29 March, but even before the preliminary results of the first round were released on 26 March, at least seven candidates, including Anta Babacar Ngom and Déthié Fall, had already conceded defeat to Bassirou Diomaye Faye. This came after the first set of tallies announced showed Faye had won the majority of votes in the first round, triggering widespread street celebrations in Dakar. Hours later, the ruling party's candidate, Amadou Ba, conceded defeat with congratulations to Faye. Reacting to his victory, Faye pledged to "govern with humility and transparency, and to fight corruption at all levels", and to devote himself to "rebuilding our institutions".

Outgoing president Macky Sall also congratulated Faye, hailing "a victory for Senegalese democracy".

Faye's victory is the first instance that an opposition candidate won an election in the first round since Senegal's independence in 1960. Faye was officially inaugurated as president on 2 April.

The annual Independence Day parade in Dakar on 4 April was cancelled, with authorities citing the uncertainty caused by the election campaign.

=== International ===
- African Union Commission President Moussa Faki Mahamat issued a statement saying that he "warmly congratulates" Faye on his victory and wished him "full success in his weighty and noble charge".
- (China) Foreign ministry spokesperson Lin Jian congratulated Faye for his victory and welcomed working with the new government.
- (France) President Emmanuel Macron congratulated Faye on his victory, stating that he looked forward to working with him.
- (Nigeria) President Bola Tinubu congratulated Faye in a press statement. He remarked that this election, along with the 2023 Liberian general election, showed that democracy is well-rooted in West Africa. He also expressed his congratulations in his concurrent role as chairman of ECOWAS.
- (Rwanda) President Paul Kagame congratulated Faye for his victory and praised the conduct of the election.
- (South Africa) President Cyril Ramaphosa congratulated Faye for his victory and praised Senegal for having a peaceful transition of power.
- (The Gambia) President Adama Barrow praised the peaceful conduct of the election and said that he looked forward to working with Faye.
- (United States) President Joe Biden congratulated Faye in a press statement and said that the election was a victory for Senegal's democracy.

== Analysis ==
The elections were one of five in Africa in 2024 resulted in a transfer of power to the opposition, the others being Botswana, Mauritius, Somaliland and Ghana. This was the most significant power transfer in a single electoral year in Africa since the rebirth of constitutional rule on the continent in the early 1990s.

== See also ==
- National Autonomous Electoral Commission (Senegal)
