= United in Hope =

United in Hope Benno Bokk Yaakaar
- Abbreviation: BBY
- Leader: Mahammed Dionne
- Founder: Macky Sall
- Founded: 2012
- Dissolved: 2 September 2024
- Succeeded by: Takku Wallu Sénégal; Jàmm ak Njariñ
- Ideology: Liberalism; Faction: Social democracy
- Political position: Centre; Faction: Centre-left
- Continental affiliation: Africa Liberal Network
- International affiliation: Liberal International
- Member parties: Alliance for the Republic; Alliance of the Forces of Progress; Socialist Party of Senegal; Rewmi
- Colours: Brown, Beige

Website
- www.bby2022.com bby.sn

United in Hope (Wolof: Benno Bokk Yaakaar, BBY; French: Unis par l'espoir) was a political coalition in Senegal led by then-President Macky Sall's Alliance for the Republic party. The coalition managed to obtain a majority in the National Assembly both in the 2012 and the 2017 election. Following the 2022 election the coalition fell one seat short of the majority, but still managed to form a minority government thanks to the support to Pape Diop, the only MP elected from Bokk Gis Gis. However, on 25 September 2022 Aminata Touré, who lead the 2022 electoral campaign, announced she would no longer sit with BBY in the Assembly, accusing President Sall of promoting Amadou Mame Diop as president of the National Assembly due to "familial ties", meaning that the government lost its majority in the chamber.

The coalition was dissolved by Macky Sall on 2 September 2024. APR and Rewmi subsequently joined the Takku Wallu Sénégal coalition led by Macky Sall, while AFP and PS joined the Jàmm ak Njariñ coalition, led by Amadou Ba.

== Composition ==
The coalition was composed of the following parties:

Party	Abbr.	Leader	Ideology	Membership
Alliance for the Republic; Alliance pour la république	APR	Macky Sall	Liberalism	2012–2024
Alliance of the Forces of Progress; Alliance des forces de progrès	AFP	Moustapha Niasse	Social democracy	2012–2024
Socialist Party of Senegal; Parti Socialiste du Sénégal	PS	Aminata Mbengue Ndiaye	Social democracy	2012–2024
Rewmi; Rewmi		Idrissa Seck	Liberalism; Economic liberalism	2012–2013; 2020–2024

== Electoral history ==
=== National Assembly elections ===
Election	Party leader	Votes	%	Seats	+/–	Position	Status
2012	Macky Sall	1,040,899	53.06%	119 / 150	New	▲1st	Majority
2017	Macky Sall	1,637,761	49.47%	125 / 165	▲6	1st	Majority
2022	Aminata Touré	1,518,137	46.56%	82 / 165	▼43	1st	Minority
