= And Ci Koolutè Nguir Senegal =

Political party in Senegal

- Abbreviation: ACKNS
- Leader: Abdoul Karim Sall
- Colors: Brown
- National Assembly: 1 / 165

And Ci Koolutè Nguir Senegal (ACKNS) is a Senegalese political party led by Abdoul Karim Sall. He is a former government minister and mayor of Mbao.

== History ==
The party won one seat in the National Assembly at the 2024 Senegalese parliamentary election.

== Election results ==
Year	Leader	Votes	%	Seats	+/–	Rank	Status
2024	Abdoul Karim Sall	21,391	0.59%	1 / 165	▲	▲10th	Opposition

== See also ==
- List of political parties in Senegal
