= Court of Cassation (Senegal) =

Highest court in Senegal

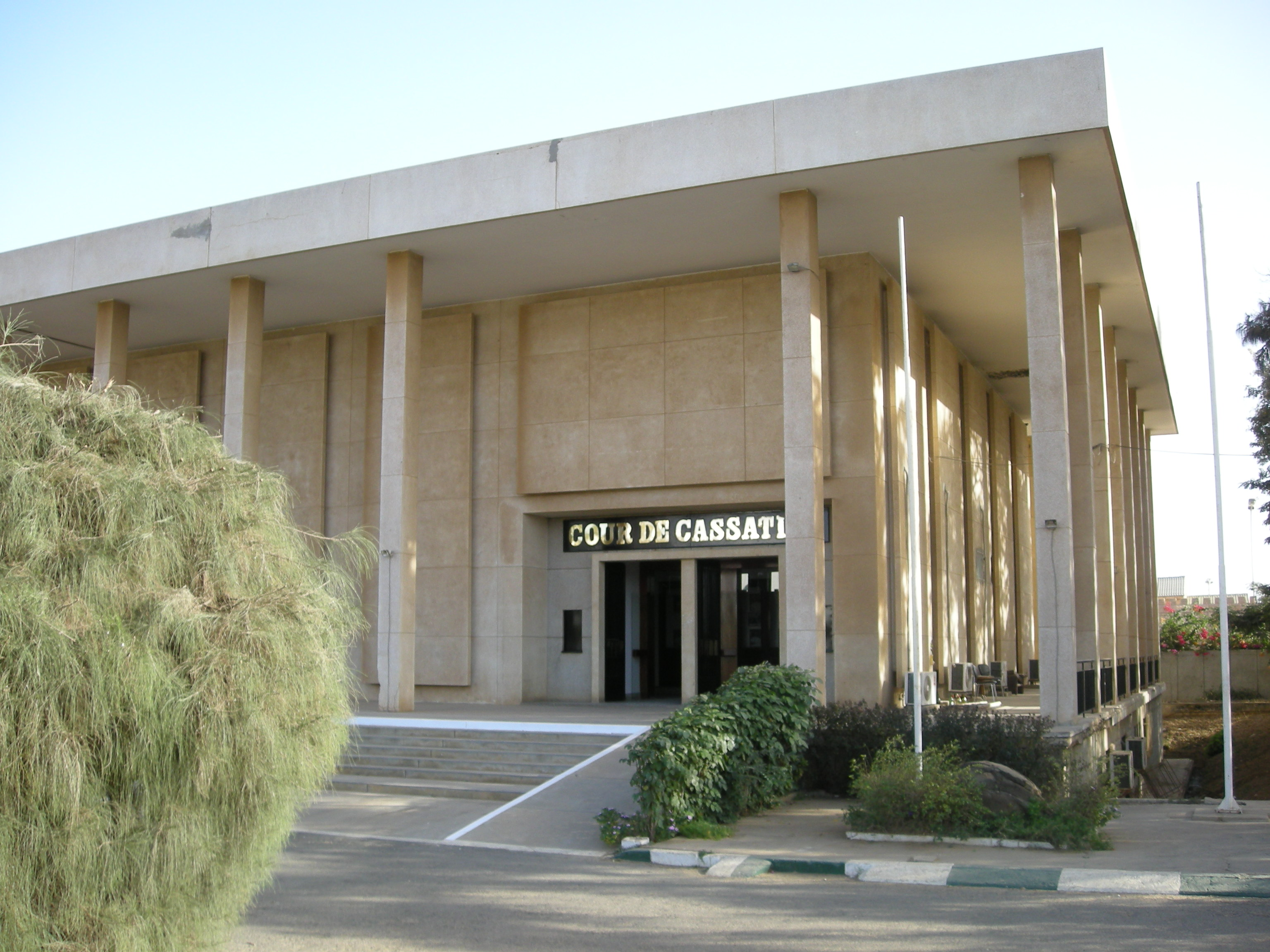
The Court of Cassation in Dakar

The Court of Cassation (French: Cour de cassation) is the highest court in Senegal. It is based on the model of the French Court of Cassation.

== See also ==
- Politics of Senegal
- Court of cassation (for a list of other courts of cassation around the world)
