= Kiraay ak Natangue =

Political party in Senegal

- Abbreviation: KaN
- Leader: Birima Mangara
- Colors: Green
- National Assembly: 1 / 165

Kiraay ak Natangue is a Senegalese political party led by Birima Mangara.

== History ==
The party won one seat in the National Assembly at the 2024 Senegalese parliamentary election.

== Election results ==
Year	Leader	Votes	%	Seats	+/–	Rank	Status
2024	Birima Mangara	26,775	0.74%	1 / 165	▲	▲7th	Opposition

== See also ==
- List of political parties in Senegal
