= The Nationalists / Jël Linu Moom =

Political party in Senegal

The Nationalists / Jël Linu Moom Les Nationalistes / Jël Linu Moom
- Abbreviation: LN/JLM
- Leader: Tahirou Sarr
- Founded: Tahirou Sarr
- Ideology: Nationalism; Anti-immigration
- National Assembly: 1 / 165

The Nationalists / Jël Linu Moom (LN/JLM) is a Senegalese political party led by Tahirou Sarr.

== History ==
The party won one seat in the National Assembly at the 2024 Senegalese parliamentary election.

== Ideology ==
The party's ideology is nationalism.

== Election results ==
Year	Leader	Votes	%	Seats	+/–	Rank	Status
2024	Tahirou Sarr	26,876	0.74%	1 / 165	▲	▲7th	Opposition

== See also ==
- List of political parties in Senegal
