= Malick Gakou =

Senegalese economist and politician

Minister of Commerce, Industry and the Informal Sector of Senegal
- In office 29 October 2012 – 26 August 2013
- President: Macky Sall
- Prime Minister: Abdoul Mbaye
- Preceded by: Mata Sy Diallo
- Succeeded by: Alioune Sarr

Minister of Sports of Senegal
- In office 4 April 2012 – 29 October 2012
- President: Macky Sall
- Prime Minister: Abdoul Mbaye
- Preceded by: Faustin Diatta
- Succeeded by: Mbagnick Ndiaye

Personal details
- Born: August 17, 1961 (age 65) Dakar, Senegal
- Party: Grand Party (2015–present); Alliance of the Forces of Progress (until 2015)
- Education: Warsaw School of Economics, Poland
- Occupation: Politician, Economist

El Hadj Malick Gakou (born August 17, 1961) is a Senegalese politician and economist. He served as the Minister of sport of Senegal from 2012 to 2013.

== Early life and education ==
Malick was born on 17 August 1961 in Dakar, Senegal. He spent his early childhood in Thiaroye-sur-Mer, then Pikine, and later Guédiawaye. He completed primary education at École Primaire de Thiaroye-sur-Mer, and furthered at Pikine South college. Subsequently, his family moved to Guédiawaye where they settled permanently. He earned his baccalauréat (series F2, electrical engineering). After the baccalauréat, he obtained a foreign scholarship and chose to study in Poland. He attended the language school in Łódź, then the Warsaw School of Economics (SGH) where he obtained a master's degree in commerce extérieur (external trade) and a doctorate in economics, with specialization in development policy, in December 1992.
