= Alliance for the Republic (Senegal) =

Political party in Senegal

Alliance for the Republic Alliance pour la république
- President: Macky Sall
- Founded: 1 December 2008
- Split from: Senegalese Democratic Party
- Headquarters: Dakar, Senegal
- Ideology: Economic liberalism Moderate social conservatism
- Political position: Centre
- National affiliation: Takku Wallu Sénégal
- Continental affiliation: Africa Liberal Network
- International affiliation: Liberal International
- Colours: Brown, Beige
- National Assembly: 16 / 165

Website
- http://www.apr.sn/

The Alliance for the Republic–Yakaar (French: Alliance pour la république, APR) is a political party in Senegal. It was formed by former Prime Minister and 4th president Macky Sall after his departure from the Senegalese Democratic Party (PDS) in December 2008. Macky Sall was also APR's candidate in the 2012 presidential election in which he defeated incumbent President Abdoulaye Wade. APR was joined by several former members of the PDS.

It is the dominant partner in the United in Hope coalition, which has held a majority in the National Assembly until 25 September 2022 when Aminata Touré announced she would no longer sit with the majority in the Assembly, accusing President Sall of promoting Amadou Mame Diop as president of the National Assembly due to "familial ties".

== Election results ==
=== Presidential elections ===
Election	Party candidate	First Round		Second Round		Result
Election	Party candidate	Votes	%	Votes	%	Result
2012	Macky Sall	719,367	26.58%	1,909,244	65.80%	Won ✓
2019	Macky Sall	2,555,426	58.26%	—N/a		Won ✓
2024	Amadou Ba	1,605,086	35.79%	—N/a		Lost ✗

=== National Assembly elections ===
Election	Party leader	Votes	%	Seats	+/–	Position	Outcome
2012 (Note: Run as part of United in Hope coalition.)	Macky Sall	1,040,899	53.06%	119 / 150	New	▲1st	Coalition (United in Hope)
2017	Macky Sall	1,637,761	49.47%	125 / 165	▲6	1st	Coalition (United in Hope)
2022	Aminata Touré	1,518,137	46.56%	82 / 165	▼43	1st	Coalition (United in Hope)
2024 (Note: Run as part of the Takku Wallu Sénégal coalition.)	Macky Sall	531,466	14.67%	16 / 165	▼66	▼2nd	Opposition

== See also ==
- Abdou Mbow, spokesperson for the Alliance for the Republic (Senegal)
