= Keur Massar department =

Coordinates: 14.7785°N 17.3139°W

Keur Massar
- Department
- Country: Senegal
- Region: Dakar Region
- Capital: Keur Massar Nord

Area
  - Total: 45.64 km^{2} (17.62 sq mi)

Population (2023 census)
  - Total: 759,849
  - Density: 16,650/km^{2} (43,120/sq mi)
- Time zone: UTC+0 (GMT)

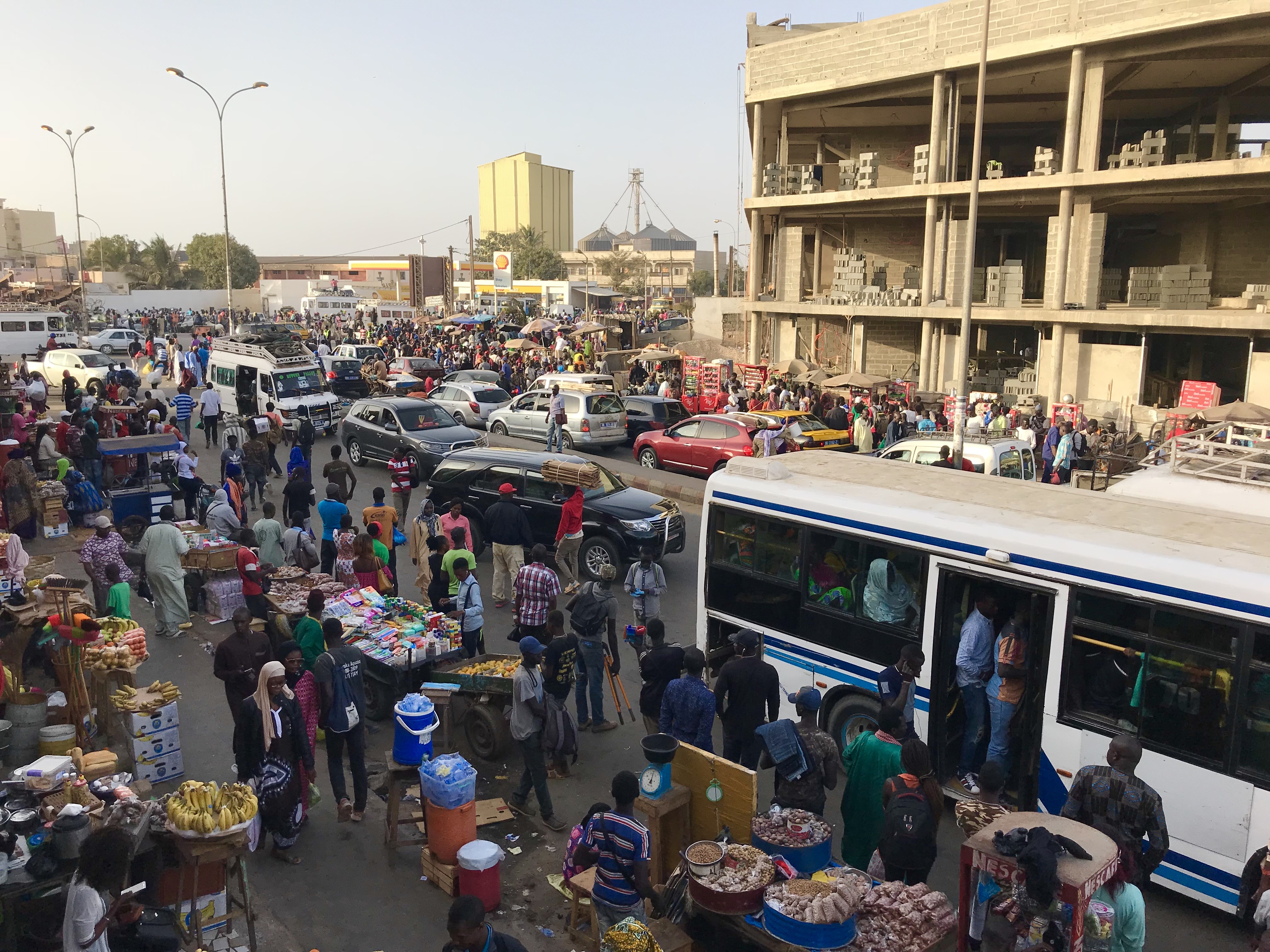
Keur Massar in 2018.

Keur Massar department is one of the 46 departments of Senegal, located at the entrance to the Cap-Vert peninsula, east of Dakar.

== History ==
The city was made into a department on 28 May 2021 by President Macky Sall; thus, it became the 46th department of Senegal.

== Demographics ==
The department has a population of 760,000 inhabitants (2023 census).
