= 2012 Senegalese parliamentary election =

- 1 July 2012
- All 150 seats in the National Assembly; 76 seats needed for a majority
- Turnout: 36.67%
Party	Leader	Vote %	Seats
BBY	Macky Sall	53.06	119
PDS	Abdoulaye Wade	15.23	12
Bokk Gis Gis		7.30	4
Bes Du Nakk		5.78	4
MRDS		3.60	2
PVD		2.47	2
URD		1.12	1
MPS/FAXAS		1.11	1
CPJE		1.06	1
Tekki 2012		1.05	1
DSTC		0.96	1
Leeral Coalition		0.91	1
AJ/PADS		0.81	1
This lists parties that won seats. See the complete results below.

Parliamentary elections were held in Senegal on 1 July 2012 to elect the 150 members of the National Assembly. The result was a landslide victory for the United in Hope coalition supporting newly elected President Macky Sall, which won 119 of the 150 seats in the National Assembly. Voter turnout in the election was just 37%.

== Background ==
Changes to the electoral law passed in 2010 included introducing mandatory gender parity, with 50% of candidates on party lists required to be women. Researchers Barrel Gueye and Selly Ba attributed the gender parity law to what they see as the third wave of Senegalese feminism. A total of 24 lists were submitted for the election, with over 7,000 candidates, including Laurence Gavron, the first white woman to run for election to Parliament.

Of the 150 seats in the National Assembly, 60 were elected through proportional representation and 90 in constituencies.

The election had originally been scheduled for 17 June 2012, but President Macky Sall announced a change of date after saying there was not enough time to prepare for it and that he had consulted the opposition Senegalese Democratic Party (PDS) on the move.

== Results ==
As a result of the new law on equal representation on party lists, 64 women were elected to the Assembly.

Party	Votes	%	Seats		
Party	Votes	%	National	Departmental	Total
United in Hope	1,040,899	53.06	32	87	119
Senegalese Democratic Party	298,846	15.23	9	3	12
Bokk Gis Gis	143,180	7.30	4	0	4
Citizen Movement for National Reform/Bes Du Ñakk	113,321	5.78	4	0	4
Republican Movement for Socialism and Democracy	70,655	3.60	2	0	2
Party for Truth and Development	48,553	2.47	2	0	2
Union for Democratic Renewal	21,964	1.12	1	0	1
Senegalese Patriotic Movement/Faxas	21,868	1.11	1	0	1
Patriotic Convergence for Justice and Equity	20,762	1.06	1	0	1
Party for the Emergence of Citizens/Tekki	20,671	1.05	1	0	1
Deggo Souxali Transport ak Commerce	18,859	0.96	1	0	1
Leeral Coalition	17,791	0.91	1	0	1
And-Jëf/African Party for Democracy and Socialism	15,889	0.81	1	0	1
Democratic Alliance	14,841	0.76	0	0	0
And Taxawal Askan Wi Coalition	12,922	0.66	0	0	0
Wallu Askan Senegal Coalition	12,044	0.61	0	0	0
Rally of the Ecologists of Senegal	11,783	0.60	0	0	0
Salam Coalition	10,855	0.55	0	0	0
Authentic Socialist Party	9,577	0.49	0	0	0
Lii Dal Na Xel coalition	9,216	0.47	0	0	0
Taxawu Askan Wi Party	8,107	0.41	0	0	0
Synergy for Progress and Democracy	7,326	0.37	0	0	0
Allied Coalition of the People	6,717	0.34	0	0	0
Citizen Democracy	5,130	0.26	0	0	0
Total	1,961,776	100.00	60	90	150
Valid votes	1,961,776	99.64			
Invalid/blank votes	7,076	0.36			
Total votes	1,968,852	100.00			
Registered voters/turnout	5,368,783	36.67			
Source: Direction Générale des Élections

The United in Hope coalition included the Alliance for the Republic.

== Aftermath ==
The pro-Sall United in Hope coalition won an overwhelming majority of seats in the National Assembly, 119 out of 150, while the PDS saw its share of seats plummet to only 12. The remaining 19 seats were distributed amongst an assortment of small parties. On 30 July 2012, one of Sall's most prominent allies, Moustapha Niasse, was elected as President of the National Assembly; he defeated a PDS deputy, Oumar Sarr. Niasse received 126 votes against 17 votes for Sarr; there were three blank votes. Eight vice-presidents were elected, including Awa Guèye as First Vice-President and Moustapha Cissé Lô as Second Vice-President. None of the vice-president posts went to a deputy from the opposition, leading it to complain that the majority had excluded it and ignored parliamentary tradition. While the opposition Liberals and Democrats Parliamentary Group was too few in number to guarantee it one of the posts, the opposition nevertheless felt that it should have been given a post for reasons of tradition and "dignity".
