= The Servants / MPR =

Political party in Senegal

The Servants / MPR (French: Les Serviteurs / MPR) is a political coalition, made up of The Servants and Let's March for the Rebirth (French: En Marche pour la Renaissance), which has one seat in the Parliament of Senegal.

== Electoral results ==
=== Presidential elections ===
Election	Candidate	First Round		Second Round		Result
Election	Candidate	Votes	%	Votes	%	Result
2024	Papa Djibril Fall	18,304	0.41%	—		Lost ✗

== See also ==
- List of political parties in Senegal
