= Anta Babacar Ngom =

Senegalese entrepreneur and politician

Anta Babacar Ngom Diack
- Born: 1984 or 1986
- Citizenship: Senegalese
- Education: Masters in Economics from York University; Masters international project management and NICT; MBA in Communication at Sciences Po Paris
- Occupations: entrepreneur and politician

Anta Babacar Ngom Diack (born 1986 or 1984, in Malika, Senegal), is a Senegalese entrepreneur and politician. She is the general director of the Sedima group.

== Life and career ==
=== Early life ===
Anta Babacar Ngom was born in 1986 or 1984.

As the daughter of Babacar Ngom, who is the founding president of SEDIMA, Anta Babacar Ngom Diack grew up on the Malika family farm. She first went to study in Canada where she obtained a master's degree in economics from York University in Toronto, Ontario. She then continued her studies in France where she completed her Master 2 in international project management and NICT in Paris, then her Executive MBA in communication at Sciences Po Paris.

=== Career ===
Anta Babacar Ngom Diack began her professional career in 2009 within the family business Sedima, a poultry farming company. She successively held the positions of executive officer, strategy and development manager, director of the strategy and development division and deputy general director before taking over in 2016 at the head of the company as general director of Sedima.

Anta Babacar Ngom Diack is married and is the mother of two children.

=== Political career ===
Anta Babacar Ngom Diack created her political party, the Alternative for New Citizens (ARC) in August 2023. She announced her candidacy in the 2024 presidential election that was scheduled for February 2024 and whose first round was held on 24 March 2024. She protested against the postponement of the election and was briefly arrested.
