= Khalifa Sall =

Senegalese politician

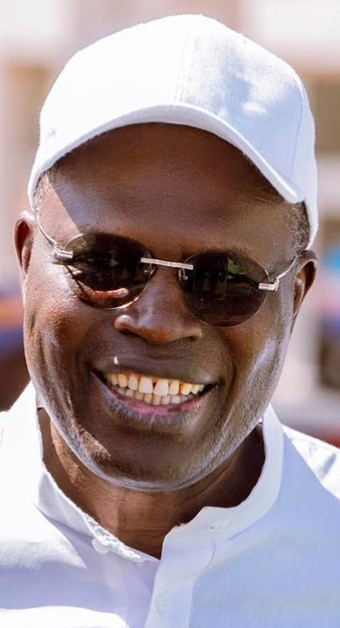
Khalifa Sall in 2023

Khalifa Ababacar Sall (born 1 January 1956) is a Senegalese politician. He is a former government minister and a former mayor of Dakar.

Sall became involved in political activism at the age of 11. He was a long-time member of the Socialist Party of Senegal. He was elected municipal councilor, and later a member of the National Assembly. During Abdou Diouf's presidency, he served as a minister. Sall was elected mayor of Dakar in 2009, then was re-elected, serving until 2018. He was expelled from the Socialist Party of Senegal in 2017. In March 2017, he was arrested due to being suspected of embezzling 1.8 billion CFA francs ($3 million). In 2018, he was given a five year prison sentence and was removed from his position as mayor by president Macky Sall (no relation). Macky Sall pardoned him in 2019. He was the leader of Manko Taxawu Sénégal in the 2022 Senegalese parliamentary election, and was a candidate for President of Senegal in the 2024 Senegalese presidential election.

He is unrelated to Macky Sall, the country’s former president.
