= Amadou Ba =

Prime minister of Senegal from 2022 to 2024

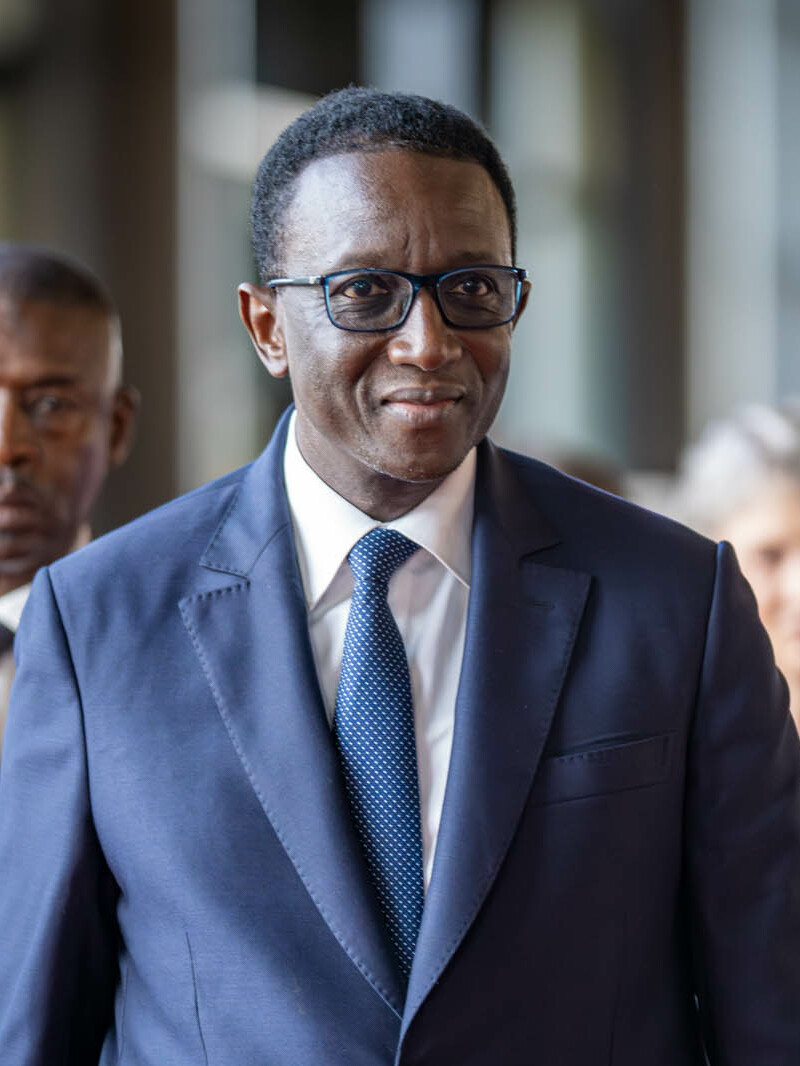
- Ba in 2023

Prime Minister of Senegal
- In office 17 September 2022 – 6 March 2024
- President: Macky Sall
- Preceded by: Mahammed Dionne (2019)
- Succeeded by: Sidiki Kaba

Foreign Minister of Senegal
- In office 5 April 2019 – 1 November 2020
- President: Macky Sall
- Prime Minister: Mohammed Dionne
- Preceded by: Sidiki Kaba
- Succeeded by: Aissata Tall Sall

Minister of Finance and Economy
- In office 2 September 2013 – 5 April 2019
- President: Macky Sall
- Prime Minister: Aminata Touré; Mohammed Dionne
- Preceded by: Amadou Kane
- Succeeded by: Abdoulaye Daouda Diallo

Personal details
- Born: 17 May 1961 (age 65) Dakar, Senegal
- Party: New Responsibility (since 2024)
- Other political affiliations: Alliance for the Republic (until 2024)

Amadou Ba (born 17 May 1961) is a Senegalese politician who served as Prime Minister of Senegal from 17 September 2022 to 6 March 2024. He also served as the Foreign Minister of Senegal from 2019 to 2020. He was Minister of Finance and Economy from 2013–2019. Ba lost in the 2024 Senegalese presidential election against PASTEF tax inspector Bassirou Diomaye Faye. Faye replaced him with the leader of PASTEF, Ousmane Sonko.

Ba was cited as one of the Top 100 most influential Africans by New African magazine in 2011, 2012 and 2013.

== Early life and education ==
After achieving a technical baccalauréat in management in 1980, Ba received a master's degree in economic science, focusing on corporate management and a diploma of taxes and estates from the National School of Administration and Magistrature (ENAM) in 1988.

== Career ==
Ba was a trainee inspector in Diourbel in 1989, then Chief Inspector of the first division of value-added tax at the General Directorate of Taxes and Estates (DGID) in Dakar. In 1991 he undertook further training at the Institut international d'administration publique in Paris and in Baltimore.

From 1990 to 1992, Ba was Head Inspector for Dakar-Plateau, then held the position of Controlling Commissioner of Insurance at the Directorate of Insurance until 1994, and then Verifying Inspector at the Directorate of Verification and Fiscal Investigations.

After more training in 2001 at the École nationale des impôts in Clermont-Ferrand, Ba became head of the Centre for Large Enterprises in the Directorate of Taxes in 2002. In 2004 he was Director of Taxes for a year. In November of the same year, he was named Director-General of Taxes and Estates. During his tenure, a new Code général des impôts was begun, which entered into force in January 2013.

Alongside these roles, Ba taught at ENAM in the taxes and estates department from 1992 and at COFEB/BCEAO from 1995 to 2000.

When Aminata Touré became prime minister on 2 September 2013, Ba was appointed Minister of Finance and Economy, replacing Amadou Kane. He retained this position when Mohammed Dionne took over as prime minister in 2014. He was appointed as prime minister by president Macky Sall on 17 September 2022, re-establishing the position of prime minister following its abolition in April 2019.

=== Presidential campaign ===
On September 9, 2023, he was chosen by President Macky Sall to be the candidate of the United in Hope coalition for the 2024 presidential election.

Ba resigned as prime minister on 6 March 2024 to contest the election and sought to represent continuity and stability. He vowed to continue the legacy of Macky Sall with a positive investment climate and said a vote for him is a vote for "greater peace and prosperity". He hit out at opposition candidate Bassirou Diomaye Faye and PASTEF leader Ousmane Sonko, saying their proposals are radical and labelling them "bandits". He argued his ministerial track record proves he will oversee development and create one million jobs in five years.

== Other activities ==
- African Development Bank (AfDB), Ex-Officio Member of the Board of Governors (since 2013)
- International Monetary Fund (IMF), Ex-Officio Member of the Board of Governors (since 2013)
- Multilateral Investment Guarantee Agency (MIGA), World Bank Group, Ex-Officio Member of the Board of Governors (since 2013)
- World Bank, Ex-Officio Member of the Board of Governors (since 2013)

== Personal life ==
Ba is married and has three children.
