= National Assembly (Senegal) =

Lower house of the Parliament of Senegal

Coordinates: 14°39′45″N 17°26′18″W

National Assembly of Senegal Assemblée nationale du Sénégal
- 15th National Assembly

Type
- Type: Unicameral

Leadership
- President of the National Assembly: Ousmane Sonko, PASTEF since 26 May 2026
- Prime Minister: Ahmadou Al Aminou Lo, Independent since 25 May 2026

Structure
- Seats: 165
- Political groups: PASTEF (130); Takku Wallu Sénégal (16); Jàmm ak Njariñ (7); Sàmm Sa Kàddu (3) (Note: Taxawu Sénégal (1); PUR (1); ARC (1)); Andu Nawlé (2); Farlu (1); Jël Linu Moom (1); Kiraay ak Natangue (1); Sénégaal Kese (1); Sopi Senegal (1); And Ci Koolutè (1); And Beesal Sénégal (1)

Elections
- Voting system: Parallel system
- First election: 31 March 1957
- Last election: 17 November 2024
- Next election: 2029

Meeting place
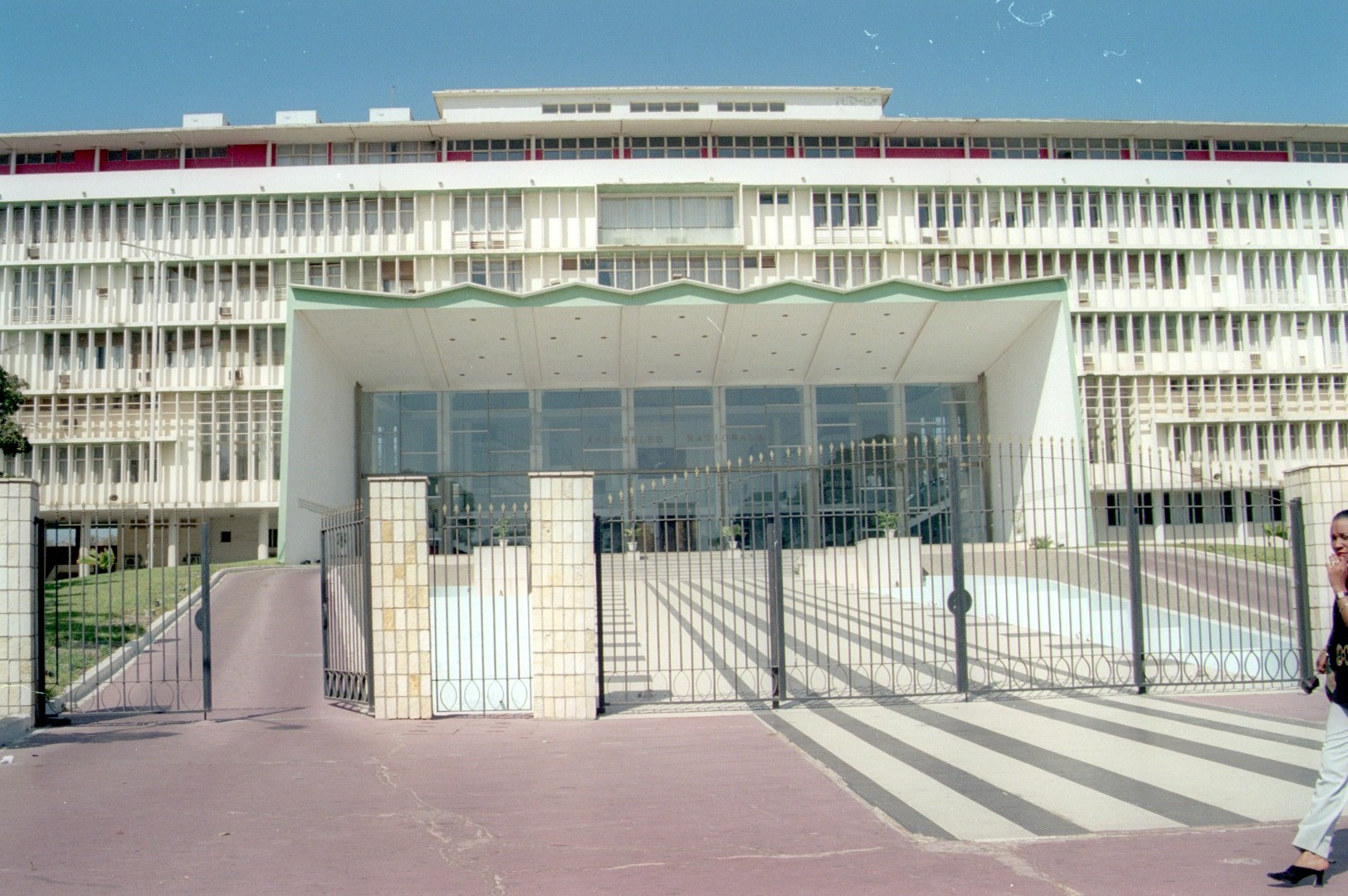
- Place Soweto, Dakar

Website
- assemblee.sn

The National Assembly (French: Assemblée nationale) is the unicameral legislature of Senegal. Its 165 members, known as deputies, are elected for five-year terms and sit on Place Soweto in Dakar.

Since the snap election of November 2024, PASTEF has held a large majority. Ousmane Sonko has presided over the Assembly since May 2026.

== History ==
The Assembly was part of a bicameral parliament from 1999 to 2001 and from 2007 to 2012, alongside the indirectly elected Senate. The Senate was abolished for the second time in September 2012, and the savings were used to help flood victims.

The 14th legislature, elected in the election of 31 July 2022, gave Macky Sall's coalition a narrow majority of 83 of the 165 seats. On 12 September 2024, President Bassirou Diomaye Faye dissolved it and called early elections, in which PASTEF won 130 seats. Malick Ndiaye was elected president of the 15th legislature on 2 December 2024 with 134 votes; aged 41, he became the youngest president in the Assembly's history.

After Faye dismissed Prime Minister Ousmane Sonko on 22 May 2026, Ndiaye resigned on 24 May. Sonko, who had returned to his seat, was elected president of the Assembly on 26 May with 132 of the 133 votes cast, in a vote boycotted by the opposition. He announced that PASTEF would not take part in the government of Prime Minister Ahmadou Al Aminou Lo, formed on 1 June 2026, although several of its members joined it.

== Electoral system ==
The 165 deputies are elected by parallel voting. 112 seats are majoritarian: 97 are filled in the 46 departments and 15 in eight constituencies for Senegalese living abroad, the list with the most votes winning all the seats of its constituency. The remaining 53 seats are allocated proportionally to national lists using the largest remainder method. Voters cast a single ballot for both components. Under the 2010 gender parity law, candidate lists must alternate men and women. Women hold about 41% of the seats.

== Historical election results ==
Political Party/Coalition	Election Year							
Political Party/Coalition	1963	1968(1)	1973(1)	1978	1983	1988	1993	1998
Senegalese Progressive Union (UPS) (note 2)	80	-	-	-	-	-	-	-
Socialist Party of Senegal (PS)	-	80	100	83	111	103	84	93
Senegalese Democratic Party (PDS)	-	-	-	17	08	17	27	23
National Democratic Rally (RND)	-	-	-	-	01	-	-	01
Democratic League - Movement for the Labour Party (LD-MPT)	-	-	-	-	-	-	03	03
Let Us Unite Senegal (JLS) (note 3)	-	-	-	-	-	-	03	-
Party of Independence and Work (PIT)	-	-	-	-	-	-	02	01
Senegalese Democratic Union-Renewal (UDS-R)	-	-	-	-	-	-	01	01
Union for Democratic Renewal (URD)	-	-	-	-	-	-	-	11
And-Jëf-African Party for Democracy and Socialism (AJ-PADS)	-	-	-	-	-	-	-	04
Convention of Democrats and Patriots-Garab Gi (CDP-Garab Gi)	-	-	-	-	-	-	-	01
Front for Socialism and Democracy/Benno Jubël (FSD-BJ)	-	-	-	-	-	-	-	01
Gaïndé Centrist Bloc (BGC)	-	-	-	-	-	-	-	01
Total	80	80	100	100	120	120	120	140

Later elections: 2001, 2007, 2012, 2017, 2022 and 2024.

=== Notes ===
1. The Senegalese Progressive Union (UPS) was the Socialist Party's predecessor.
2. Senegal was a one-party state from 1966 to 1974. Only the Socialist Party fielded candidates in the 1968 and 1973 elections.
3. Let Us Unite Senegal (JLS) was a coalition of three political parties - the National Democratic Rally (RND), And Jëf-African Party for Democracy and Socialism (AJ-PADS), and Convention for Democrats and Patriots-Garab Gi (CDP-Garab Gi).

== Presidents ==
The president of the Assembly is elected by the deputies. Recent holders are Malick Ndiaye (2024–2026) and Ousmane Sonko (since 2026).

== See also ==
- Elections in Senegal
- Politics of Senegal
- Senate (Senegal)
