= List of years in Senegal =

This is a list of years in Senegal.

== 20th century ==
1990s
1990
1991
1992
1993
1994
1995
1996
1997
1998
1999

== 21st century ==
2000s: 2000, 2001, 2002, 2003, 2004, 2005, 2006, 2007, 2008, 2009
2010s: 2010, 2011, 2012, 2013, 2014, 2015, 2016, 2017, 2018, 2019
2020s: 2020, 2021, 2022, 2023, 2024, 2025, 2026, 2027, 2028, 2029

== See also ==
- Timeline of Senegal
- History of Senegal
- Timeline of Dakar
- Timeline of Saint-Louis, Senegal
- Timeline of Serer history

== Bibliography ==
- "Senegal". Political Chronology of Africa. Political Chronologies of the World. Europa Publications. 2001. p. 357+. ISBN 0203409957.
- Andreas Mehler; et al., eds. (2008). "Senegal". Africa Yearbook: Politics, Economy and Society South of the Sahara in 2007. Vol. 4. Koninklijke Brill. p. 175+. ISBN 9789004168053.
