= 2022 in Senegal =

- Decades: 2000s; 2010s; 2020s
- See also: Other events of 2022; Timeline of Senegalese history

Events in the year 2022 in Senegal.

== Incumbents ==
- President: Macky Sall (since 2012)

== Events ==
Ongoing – COVID-19 pandemic in Senegal

February

- Senegal won the Africa Cup of Nations for the first time in its history after defeating Egypt in the finals.

=== May ===
- 26 May: A hospital fire kills 11 babies in a neonatal ward. As a result, Abdoulaye Diouf Sarr is sacked as Minister of Health.

=== July ===
- 31 July: 2022 Senegalese parliamentary election

August

- Senegal experienced high inflation especially in food and fuel prices which increased the cost of living.

November

- The Senegal national team participated in the 2022 FIFA World cup in Qatar and reached the round of 16.

=== December ===
- 1 December: In the National Assembly pregnant MP Amy Ndiaye is attacked by fellow MPs Mamadou Niang and Massata Samb.

== Deaths ==
- 17 January: Karim Ouellet, 37, Senegalese-born Canadian singer-songwriter.
- 18 June: Mamadou Sarr, 83, Olympic sprinter (1968).
- 18 November: Youssou Diagne, 84, politician, president of the National Assembly (2001–2002).
