= 2020 in Senegal =

- Decades: 2000s; 2010s; 2020s
- See also: Other events of 2020; Timeline of Senegalese history

Events in the year 2020 in Senegal.

== Incumbents ==
- President: Macky Sall (since April 2, 2012)
- Prime Minister: Mahammed Dionne

== Events ==
=== January ===
- January 8 – West Africa's largest wind farm opens in Taiba NDiaye, Tivaouane Department.
- January 9 – Soccer player Sadio Mané (Liverpool F.C.) apologizes for missing a planned January 11 at the Museum of Black Civilisations in Dakar after being named the African Footballer of the Year.
- January 14 – Mamadou Diagna Ndiaye, president of the Senegalese Olympic Committee, promises Dakar will be ready to host the 2022 Summer Youth Olympics.
- January 15
  - Senegalese-born American rapper Akon (Locked Up) announces that plans for his new city, called "Akon City" and located near the Léopold Sédar Senghor International Airport have been finalized. The new city will trade exclusively in his digital coin Akoin.
  - The office of Karamba Diaby, who was born in Marsassoum Arrondissement, in Sédhiou Region, a member of Bundestag (English: Parliament) from Halle (Saale), Saxony-Anhalt, and a member of the Social Democratic Party of Germany, is shot at.
- January 23 – Cuties ((in French): "Mignonnes"), a film by French director of Senegalese descent Maïmouna Doucouré, premiers at the 2020 Sundance Film Festival. It goes on to win the Directing Jury Award.

=== February ===
- February 2 – Canadian Prime Minister Justin Trudeau announces a trip to Senegal this week.
- February 6 – President Macky Sall said earlier this week that Senegal could not match "big countries" in organizing emergency evacuations from China in relation to the Wuhan coronavirus outbreak, pointing to the charter flights, medical personnel and quarantine facilities necessary for such an operation.
- February 8 – President Sall is awarded the 2020 Sunhak Peace Prize.
- February 12 – Canadian Prime Minister Justin Trudeau criticizes Senegal's criminalization of homosexuality during a visit with President Sall; Sall says, 'we’re comfortable with our laws.'
- February 14 – U.S. Secretary of State Mike Pompeo arrives in Dakar for an official visit.
- February 20 – 29: 2020 African Boxing Olympic Qualification Tournament, Diamniadio, Senegal

=== March ===
- March 11
  - The Pasteur Institute of Dakar and DiaTropix team up with Mologic, a British biotech firm, to develop “point of need” test kits that can diagnose COVID-19 in 10 minutes.
  - 20,500 Dakar residents petition to make the former airport into a park.
- March 15 – Senegal imposes travel restrictions, bans cruise ships, and closes schools for three weeks in response to the coronavirus. They also ban public gatherings for a month including Muslim and Christian pilgrimages.

=== April ===
- April 14 – Hundreds of street children and teenagers are forced to a refuge north of Dakar as fear of COVID-19 spreads.

=== May ===
- May 12 – The government eases restrictions one day after COVID-19 infections increase by 30%.
- May 27 – Senegal unilaterally ends its tax agreement with Mauritius.
- May 28 – June 28: 14th Dak'Art fair with the theme I'Ndaffa/Forger/Out of Fire (a trilingual take on the word "forge" in Serer, French and English) at the IFAN Museum of African Arts in Dakar
- June 2 – COVID-19 pandemic: Educational authorities decide against reopening high schools for 550,000 children after a cluster of coronavirus infections is detected among teachers in the Ziguinchor Region, Casamance.
- June 3 – COVID-19 pandemic: Protests against the government's handling of the pandemic break out in Dakar, Touba, and Kaolack. Senegal has confirmed almost 4,000 cases of COVID-19, including 45 deaths, and thousands are unemployed.
- July 8 – International air flights restart.
- July 31 – Tabaski, public holiday A shortage of sheep is reported.

=== August ===
- August 21 – Senegalese authorities request the removal of 2,700 tons of ammonium nitrate (NH_{4}NO_{3}) from the port of Dakar. The request for the removal of the ammonium nitrate, a chemical which is used to make fertilizer, comes following the deadly 2020 Beirut explosion, which involved the ignition of ammonium nitrate. The shipment is destined for Mali, but the border is closed because of the 2020 Malian coup d'état.
- September 1 – R&B singer Akon, 47, lays the first stone for the US$6 billion village of Mbodiene south of Dakar.

=== September ===
- September 16 – Lamine Diack, 87, former director of the International Amateur Athletic Federation (IAAF), is condemned to four years of prison and fined €500,000 for allowing Russian doping at the Olympics. His son, Papa Massata Diack, who is refuged in Senegal, was sentenced to five years and fined €1 million.

=== October ===
- October 29 – 140 migrants drown when a boat from M'Bour that was bound for the Canary Islands capsizes near Saint-Louis. The national government and the UN International Organization for Migration (IOM) dispatched a mission to assess needs and provide assistance to survivors. It is the deadliest shipwreck recorded so far in 2020.

=== November ===
- November 15 – Senegal becomes the first to qualify for the 2022 African Nations Championship.

=== December ===
- December 8 – A court in Mbour sentences Mamadou Lamine Faye and two other men for paying smugglers to illegally take their sons by sea to Spain. Faye's son died en route, one of 500 migrants who have died while trying to reach the Canary Islands, and the judge said he hoped to deter others.

== Scheduled and predicted events ==
- April (TBA): The Cathedral of Saint Louis, the first Christian Church in West Africa, located in the city of Saint-Louis, Senegal, is scheduled to reopen after being closed for repairs in November 2018.
- October 5 – Grand Magal of Touba, public holiday
- October 29 – Mawlid, public holiday
- November 1 – All Saints' Day, public holiday
- December 25 – Christmas Day, public holiday

== Culture ==
- January 23 – Cuties ((in French): "Mignonnes"), a film by French director of Senegalese descent Maïmouna Doucouré, premiers at the 2020 Sundance Film Festival. It goes on to win the Directing Jury Award.
- May 22 – A Wolof-language television show called The Virus is used to provide information about the COVID-19 pandemic.

== Deaths ==
- January 17 – Charles Carrère, 91, poet
- March 27 – Jacques F. Acar, 88, Senegalese-born French doctor
- March 31 – Pape Diouf, 68, journalist.
- July 3 – Mamadou Bamba Ndiaye, 71, politician.
- July 21 – Cheikh Sadibou Fall, 69, politician, Minister of the Interior (2004).
- August 4 – Moustapha Sourang, 71, politician.
- August 5 – Senegalese murdered in arson in Denver, Colorado: Djibril Diol, 29; Adja Diol, 23; Kadidia Diol, 2; Hassan Diol; and Hawa Beye, infant.
- August 31
  - John Felagha, 26, Nigerian footballer (Eupen) dies in Senegal.
  - Édouard Karemera, 69, Rwandan politician and convicted war criminal dies in Dakar.
  - Jean Baptiste Mendy, 57, Senegalese-born French boxer, WBC Lightweight Champion (1996–1997), pancreatic cancer.
- October 31 – Iba Der Thiam, 83, politician, vice-president of the National Assembly (2001–2012).
- November 27 – Madieng Khary Dieng, 88, politician, Minister of the Interior (1991–1993).
- November 29 – Papa Bouba Diop, 42, footballer (Fulham, Portsmouth, national team); complications from amyotrophic lateral sclerosis.
- December 28 – Mamadou Niang, 81–82, military officer and politician, Minister of the Interior.

== See also ==
- 2020 in West Africa
- 2020 in politics and government
- COVID-19 pandemic in Africa
- 2020s
- 2020s in political history
- Politics of Senegal
- National Assembly (Senegal)
- Economic Community of West African States
- African Union
- Community of Sahel–Saharan States
