= 2017–18 in Senegalese football =

Season of Senegalese sport

Football in Senegal
- Season: 2017–18

Men's football
- 2017–18 Ligue 1: ASC Jaraaf
- 2017–18 Ligue 2: AS Pikine

The 2017–18 season was a season of competitive football (soccer) in Senegal.

In the top league, Ligue 1, ASC Jaraaf were the champions with an 18–7–3 record. Diambars de Saly, US Ouakam, and Guédiawaye FC were relegated to Ligue 2.

In Ligue 2, AS Pikine won the league, and was promoted to Ligue 1 alongside the second-place team, US Gorée.

== See also ==
- 2017 in Senegal
- 2018 in Senegal
