= 2021 in Senegal =

- Decades: 2000s; 2010s; 2020s
- See also: Other events of 2021; Timeline of Senegalese history

Events in the year 2021 in Senegal.

== Incumbents ==
- President: Macky Sall (since 2012)
- Prime Minister: Mahammed Dionne

== Events ==
Ongoing – COVID-19 pandemic in Senegal

=== January and February ===
- January 7 – Diary Sow, 20, a student at Paris's Lycée Louis-le-Grand and known as "Senegal's best pupil," is reported missing. She apologized for her disappearance on January 22.
- January 8 – An outbreak of H5N1 (bird flu) is reported on a farm in Thiès. 58,000 of the 100,000 flock have been killed and the others culled.
- January 9 – COVID-19 pandemic: Health Minister Ousseynou Badiane says Senegal does not have sufficient cold storage facilities for either the Pfizer–BioNTech or Moderna COVID-19 vaccine, and the country is awaiting vaccines through the World Health Organization-backed global COVAX scheme.
- January 13 – Police used tear gas to break up a demonstration in Ngor, Dakar after President Macky Sall declared a 9 p.m.–5 a.m. curfew in Dakar and Thiès Region. Other demonstrations took place in Medina and Yoff areas and suburban Pikine, Guédiawaye, and Thiaroye.
- January 23 – Hundreds of dead pelicans are found in the Djoudj National Bird Sanctuary.
- January 27 – Three teenagers are arrested in a 2020 arson in Denver that killed five Senegalese immigrants to the United States.
- February 8 – Supporters of opposition leader Ousmane Sonko clash with police in Dakar on Monday after is accused of rape.
- February 11 – The army seizes several hectares of marijuana cultivation and a rebel base in Casamance.
- February 25 – Senegal is one of four countries added to the Financial Action Task Force (FATF) list of places that are only partially in compliance with international efforts against financing terrorism and money laundering.

=== March and April ===
- March 3 – Ousmane Sonko, opposition leader, is arrested on charges of disturbing the public order. He has also been accused of rape.
- March 4
  - Supporters of Ousmane Sonko clash with police in Dakar and one person is killed in Bignona, Ziguinchor Region. Services of two private television stations are suspended.
  - Senegalese in New York protest Sonko's arrest in front of the United Nations.
- March 5 – The death toll in the pro-Sonko demonstrations reaches four.
- March 6 – A 17-year-old boy is shot during a demonstration in Vélingara Department. ECOWAS calls for calm and freedom to demonstrate.
- March 8 – Ousmane Sonko is released from custody, but two more people are killed when police fire tear gas and rubber bullets at crowds in Dakar.

== Deaths ==
- February 3 – Abdoul Aziz Mbaye, 66, diplomat and politician, Minister of Culture (since 2012); COVID-19.
- March 14 – Thione Seck, 66, singer and musician in the mbalakh genre (Raam Daam)

== See also ==
- 2021 in West Africa
- COVID-19 pandemic in Africa
- 2020s
- 2020s in political history
- Politics of Senegal
- National Assembly (Senegal)
- Economic Community of West African States
- African Union
- Community of Sahel–Saharan States
