= 2025 in Senegal =

- Decades: 2000s; 2010s; 2020s
- See also: Other events of 2025; Timeline of Senegalese history

Events in the year 2025 in Senegal.

== Incumbents ==
- President – Bassirou Diomaye Faye
- Prime Minister – Ousmane Sonko

== Events ==
=== February ===
- 25 February – Guinea-Bissau announces an agreement between the Senegalese government and the Movement of Democratic Forces of Casamance to end the Casamance conflict following talks in Bissau.

=== March ===
- 7 March – France returns two military facilities near Hann Forest and Zoological Park in Dakar to Senegalese control.

=== April ===
- 2 April – The National Assembly passes amendments to an amnesty law that covered offences made during protests against the postponement of the 2024 Senegalese presidential election to lift its coverage on charges of murder, torture and forced disappearance.

=== June ===
- 10 June – The European Union removes Senegal from its list of high risk jurisdictions for money laundering and terrorism financing.

=== July ===
- 1 July –
  - France returns the Rufisque joint station to Senegal. This station, active since 1960, was responsible for communications on the southern Atlantic coast. This is the fourth military base officially handed over to Senegal.
  - The Supreme Court upholds the conviction of prime minister Ousmane Sonko for defamation.
- 17 July – France returns Camp Geille and a nearby airbase to Senegal, completing its military withdrawal from the country.

=== August ===
- 24 August – Senegal finishes in third place at FIBA AfroBasket 2025 in Angola after defeating Cameroon 98-72 in the final in Luanda.

=== September ===
- 16 September – A boat from The Gambia carrying more than 100 migrants runs aground in Dakar on its way to the Canary Islands.

=== October ===
- 9 October – At least 17 deaths are reported nationwide following an outbreak of Rift Valley Fever that began on 21 September.
- 13 October – Senegal qualifies for the 2026 FIFA World Cup after defeating Mauritania 4-0 at the 2026 FIFA World Cup qualification.

=== November ===
- 27 November – Deposed Guinea-Bissau president Umaro Sissoco Embaló goes into exile in Senegal after the Senegalese government negotiates his release following the 2025 Guinea-Bissau coup d'état. He moves to the Republic of the Congo on 29 November.
- 29 November – A suspect in the 2004 murder of Gambian journalist Deyda Hydara is arrested in Senegal. He is extradited to the Gambia on December 2.

=== December ===
- 3 December – Student demonstrations at Cheikh Anta Diop University in Dakar escalate into clashes with security forces, over financial aid and the country’s fiscal situation.
- 11 December – The government announces a suspension of extraditions to France in response to the refusal of French authorities to return two wanted Senegalese nationals.
- 16 December – US President Donald Trump issues a proclamation imposing partial travel restrictions on Senegalese nationals travelling to the United States.

== Holidays ==
- 1 January – New Year's Day
- 30 – 31 – March – Korité
- 4 April – Independence Day
- 21 April – Easter Monday
- 1 May – Labour Day
- 6 June – Tabaski
- 9 June – Whit Monday
- 5 July – Tamkharit
- 12 August – Grand Magal of Touba
- 15 August – Assumption Day
- 4 September – The Prophet's Birthday
- 1 November – All Saints' Day
- 25 December – Christmas Day

== Art and entertainment ==
- List of Senegalese submissions for the Academy Award for Best International Feature Film

== Deaths ==
- December: Al Ousseynou Sène, footballer (ASC HLM, national team).
