= 2012 in Senegal =

- Decades: 1990s; 2000s; 2010s; 2020s
- See also: Other events of 2012; Timeline of Senegalese history

This article is a list of events in the year 2012 in Senegal.

== Incumbents ==
- President: Abdoulaye Wade (until April 2), Macky Sall (from April 2)
- Prime Minister: Souleymane Ndéné Ndiaye (until April 5), Abdoul Mbaye (from April 5)

== Events ==
=== March ===
- March 25 - Voters go to the polls to vote for the presidential election with President Wade conceding defeat to former Prime Minister Macky Sall.
- March 26 - Macky Sall is elected President of Senegal.
