= 2019 in Senegal =

- Decades: 1990s; 2000s; 2010s; 2020s
- See also: Other events of 2019; Timeline of Senegalese history

Events in the year 2019 in Senegal.

== Incumbents ==
- President: Macky Sall
- Prime Minister: Mahammed Dionne

== Events ==
- February 24 – President Macky Sall wins a second term with 58% of the vote in the 2019 Senegalese presidential election.
- July 29 — Journalist Adama Gaye (Kapital Afrik, Jeune Afrique, France 24, TV5Monde, and Al Jazeera) is arrested and charged with acting to compromise public security and offending the president.
- September 27 — The opening of Massalikoul Djinane Mosque.
- September 29 — President Macky Sall pardons his rival, the former mayor of Dakar, Khalifa Sall, who was jailed in 2018 for corruption.
- November 19 – West Africa's largest mosque opens in Touba at a cost of US $50 million.
- December 11 – Music legend Baaba Maal, who was born in Podor promises to fight to stop the desertification in the Sahel by planting trees.
- December 24 – Midnight mass is celebrated as the first event leading to the reopening of the Cathedral of Saint Louis, the first Christian Church in West Africa, in the city of Saint-Louis, Senegal.

== Deaths ==
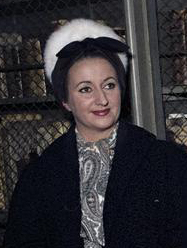
Colette Senghor

- 18 February – Kor Sarr, footballer (b. 1975).
- 1 March – Maïmouna Kane, politician (b. 1937).
- 18 November – Colette Senghor, 93, wife of Léopold Sédar Senghor, died in Verson, Normandy, France.
