= Cheikh Sadibou Fall =

Senegalese politician (1950–2020)

Minister of the Interior of Senegal
- In office 22 April 2004 – 2 November 2004
- Preceded by: Macky Sall
- Succeeded by: Ousmane Ngom

Personal details
- Born: 28 August 1950 Dakar, French Senegal
- Died: 21 July 2020 (aged 69) Toulouse, France
- Party: PDS

Cheikh Sadibou Fall (28 August 1950 – 21 July 2020) was a Senegalese politician.

== Biography ==
Fall studied law at Cheikh Anta Diop University in Dakar, then at the University of Bordeaux 1, where he obtained a DESS in business and corporate law. He finished his education at the Institut Regional Du Travail Social Nouvelle-Aquitaine, the University of Massachusetts Boston, the Liberales Institute, and the Institut régional d'administration des entreprises de Bordeaux1.

Following his education, he worked largely in the private sector as a management official, administrative and financial director, and a director of a legal expertise firm. In 1996, he was first elected mayor of Fann-Point E-Amitié, a position he held until 2001.

Fall was a member of the Senegalese Democratic Party (PDS) from 1998 to 2001 and was chairman of the Liberté-Démocratie-Progrès parliamentary group. He was appointed as Minister of Town Planning and Housing on 23 November 2000 by Moustapha Niasse, replacing the sacked Amath Dansokho. He then held his position under the leadership of Mame Madior Boye until 12 May 2001.

During the 2001 Senegalese parliamentary election, Fall was removed from the PDS party listing following a dispute with Idrissa Seck. However, Boye appointed him Minister of Fisheries after a government reshuffle. However, after the sinking of Le Joola in September 2002, Fall was sacked on 4 November 2002.

On 22 April 2004, Fall was appointed as Minister of the Interior by Macky Sall, but was relieved of his duties on 2 November and was replaced by Ousmane Ngom. In April 2005, he was appointed as Ambassador to Italy.

Cheikh Sadibou Fall died on 21 July 2020 in Toulouse, France at the age of 69.
