= 1993 in Senegal =

- Decades: 1970s; 1980s; 1990s; 2000s; 2010s
- See also: Other events of 1993; Timeline of Senegalese history

This article is a list of events in the year 1993 in Senegal.

== Incumbents ==
- President: Abdou Diouf
- Prime Minister: Mamadou Lamine Loum

== Events ==
- February 7: the delimitation treaty between Senegal and Cape Verde was signed

== Sports ==
- AS Douanes won the Senegal Premier League football championship
