= 2023 in Senegal =

- Decades: 2000s; 2010s; 2020s
- See also: Other events of 2023; Timeline of Senegalese history

Events in the year 2023 in Senegal.

== Incumbents ==
- President: Macky Sall (since 2012)
- Prime Minister: Amadou Ba (since 2022)

== Events ==
- Ongoing – COVID-19 pandemic in Senegal; 2023 Senegalese protests

=== January ===
- 8 January – Kaffrine bus crash: Two buses collide near Gniby in the Kaffrine Region, killing 40 and injuring 101. The government declares three days of mourning and introduces road safety measures.
- 16 January – Nineteen people are killed and 24 others injured by a bus–truck collision in Sakal Arrondissement.

=== March ===
- 11 March – 2023 U-20 Africa Cup of Nations final: Senegal win the 2023 U-20 Africa Cup of Nations, beating The Gambia 2–0 in Cairo to claim their first title.
- 15 March – Police fire tear gas at opposition MP Guy Marius Sagna in Dakar while he tries to visit Ousmane Sonko.

=== May ===
- 10 May – One person is killed and 30 others injured during protests against repression across Senegal.
- 12 May – An opposition-led rally organized by the F24 civil society platform takes place in Dakar, called by Ousmane Sonko to protest President Macky Sall potentially seeking a third term and to demonstrate against alleged political manipulation of the justice system.
- 16 May – The journalist Ndèye Maty Niang is arrested in Dakar over social media posts criticizing the authorities.
- 31 May – Protests erupt in Dakar after opposition leader Ousmane Sonko is sentenced to two years in prison for corrupting youth. Demonstrators build barricades, burn tires, block roads, and clash with police.

=== June ===
- 1-4 June – Clashes between protesters and security forces across Senegal result in multiple deaths and hundreds of arrests. The army is deployed, journalists are intimidated, and internet access is restricted, drawing international condemnation.
- 5 June – The Quranic teacher Serigne Khadim Mbacké is arrested after being on the run.
- 9 June – Walf TV is suspended for one month over its coverage of opposition demonstrations.

=== July ===
- 29 July – The journalist Pape Alé Niang is arrested for his Facebook comments on Sonko’s arrest; later released after 10-day hunger strike.
- 31 July – Senegal's Interior Minister announces the dissolution of opposition party Pastef, led by Ousmane Sonko, citing incitement to violence during the June protests.

=== August ===
- 15 August – Police arrest 10 men in Dakar over alleged same-sex sexual activity. The men are reportedly beaten and extorted.
- 16 August – At least 63 people are dead and 38 more are rescued after a boat from Senegal was found floating off the coast of Cape Verde.

=== October ===
- 3-5 October – SIM Senegal 2023, a major mining conference on diversifying Senegal’s mineral resources, is held in Dakar.
- 27 October – Security forces arrest PASTEF leader Amadou Ba after he makes a television appearance.
- 28 October – In Kaolack, a mob exhume and burn the body of a man suspected of being gay, an act that sparks widespread outrage and leads to an official investigation by Senegalese authorities.
