= Aminata Touré (Senegalese politician) =

Senegalese politician

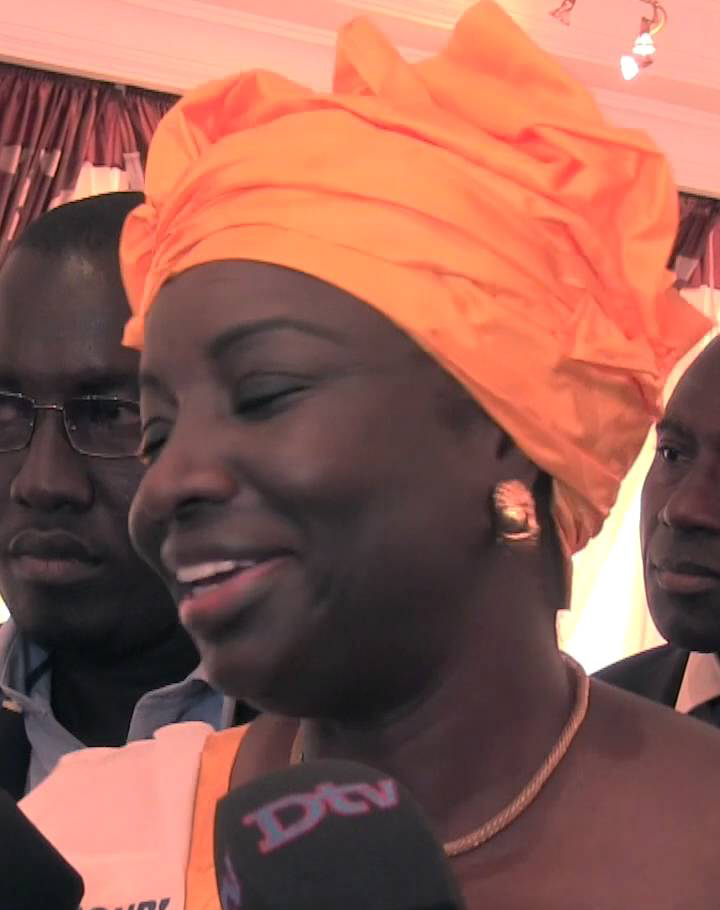
- Touré in 2016

13th Prime Minister of Senegal
- In office 1 September 2013 – 4 July 2014
- President: Macky Sall
- Preceded by: Abdoul Mbaye
- Succeeded by: Mohammed Dionne

High Representative of the President of Senegal
- Incumbent
- Assumed office 26 August 2024
- President: Bassirou Diomaye Faye

Personal details
- Born: 12 October 1962 (age 63) Dakar, Senegal
- Party: Alliance for the Republic
- Education: University of Burgundy; Aix-Marseille University; International School of Management

Aminata Touré (born 12 October 1962) is a Senegalese politician who served as the Prime Minister of Senegal from 1 September 2013 to 4 July 2014. She was the second female prime minister of Senegal after Mame Madior Boye, and she previously served as justice minister from 2012 to 2013. While campaigning for the upcoming elections in February 2024, she was arrested by the police and detained for six hours though never charged with any crime.

Her appointment as prime minister was announced while she was pursuing several corruption cases involving former government figures. She vowed to continue the course of "development and improving the living conditions of our citizens." She has been dubbed "Iron Lady" in the press due to her anti-corruption campaign and platform. She has worked for women's rights in her previous career positions.

== Early life and career ==
The daughter of a doctor and a midwife, Aminata spent her schooling days in Tambacounda, where her father was assigned, and attended her sixth year at the Gaston-Berger High School in Kaolack In her youth, Aminata played football for the Dakar Gazelles. She also studied in France, where she obtained a master's in economics in Dijon and a postgraduate degree in business administration in Aix-en-Provence. At university, she worked with the Communist Workers' League as a member and later joined the Movement for Socialism and Unity (MSU). She has worked in programs involved with family planning and reproductive health in Senegal, Burkina Faso and Côte d'Ivoire. She also worked for the United Nations Population Fund, where she was program coordinator for the Gender and HIV program in West Africa. She holds a Ph.D. degree in International Financial Management from the International School of Management. Her doctoral dissertation was focused on micro financing of women in Sub-Saharan Africa.

== Politics ==
=== Justice Minister ===
She has worked to tackle corruption. As justice minister she also worked to reform the judicial system by reducing the time that citizens had to wait for trial, and by streamlining the justice system. She initiated audits of former government officials who were in office under former president Abdoulaye Wade, including the former president's son, Karim Wade.

=== Prime minister ===
Having announced that she was being appointed prime minister, she then controversially named Sidiki Kaba to replace her as justice minister. He was later criticized due to his work on the decriminalization of homosexuality. Her cabinet was also criticized by feminists as it had only four women in a cabinet of 32 ministers.

On 4 July 2014, she was dismissed as prime minister following her failure to win a seat from Dakar in the 2014 local elections. President Macky Sall signed a decree that read: "Ms Aminata Toure's functions have been terminated."

=== Special envoy of the president ===
Three months after leaving the prime minister's office, Aminata Toure was nominated by President Macky Sall as a special envoy.

=== 2022 parliamentary election and aftermath ===
For the 2022 parliamentary election Aminata Toure led the electoral campaign of the United in Hope coalition, that ended up retaining a parliamentary majority only thanks to the support of Bokk Gis Gis' elected member Pape Diop. However on 25 September Aminata Touré announced she would no longer sit with United in Hope in the Assembly, accusing President Sall of promoting Amadou Mame Diop as president of the National Assembly due to "familial ties", meaning that the government lost its majority in the chamber.

In March 2025, Aminata Touré spoke out against the CFA Franc in Africa.

Political offices
Preceded by Abdoul Mbaye	Prime Minister of Senegal; 2013–2014	Succeeded by Mohammed Dionne
