= 2024 in Senegal =

- Decades: 2000s; 2010s; 2020s
- See also: Other events of 2024; Timeline of Senegalese history

Events in the year 2024 in Senegal.

== Incumbents ==
- President: Macky Sall (until 2 April); Bassirou Diomaye Faye (since 2 April)
- Prime Minister: Amadou Ba (until 6 March); Sidiki Kaba (until 3 April); Ousmane Sonko (since 3 April)

== Events ==
=== February ===
- 3 February: Macky Sall announces the postponement of presidential elections on 25 February.
- 5 February: Following unrest within the chamber, the National Assembly votes to postpone the presidential elections until 15 December.
- 10 February: Violent protests break out nationwide in response to the postponement of the presidential elections.
- 15 February: The Senegalese Constitutional Council strikes down the decision to postpone and reschedule the election by Macky Sall and the National Assembly as unconstitutional and orders the government to hold elections as soon as possible.
- 23 February: Macky Sall states he will leave the presidency in April, but does not give a specific date for the presidential election.

=== March ===
- 6 March:
  - The government sets the first round of presidential elections on 24 March.
  - Macky Sall dismisses Amadou Ba as prime minister to allow him to focus on his election campaign, and replaces him with Interior Minister Sidiki Kaba.
- 24 March: 2024 Senegalese presidential election; Bassirou Diomaye Faye is elected president.

=== April ===
- 2 April: Bassirou Diomaye Faye is inaugurated as president.
- 3 April: President Faye appoints Ousmane Sonko as prime minister.
- 16 April: Customs authorities seize 1,140 kilograms of cocaine valued at $146 million from a lorry in Kidira, near the Malian border, the largest drug haul inside Senegalese soil.

=== May ===
- 9 May: Ten people are injured after a Boeing 737 passenger aircraft operated by TransAir on behalf of Air Sénégal and carrying 85 passengers and crew partially catches fire and skids on the runway during takeoff at Blaise Diagne International Airport outside Dakar.

=== June ===
- 11 June: Production begins at the Sangomar oil field, the country's first offshore oil field.

=== August ===
- 13 August: Multiple media outlets stop publication and broadcasts as part of a "blackout day" to protest an alleged crackdown by the government on press freedoms.

=== September ===
- 2 September: A majority of MPs in the National Assembly vote against a proposed constitutional amendment abolishing the High Council of regional governments and the Economic, Social and Environmental Council.
- 8 September: At least 26 people are killed after a boat carrying migrants capsizes off the coast of Mbour.
- 9 September: At least 16 people are killed and 22 are injured after a bus and a lorry collide near Ndangalma.
- 12 September: President Faye dissolves the National Assembly and orders snap elections for the chamber on 17 November.
- 22 September: Thirty people are found dead on a boat believed to be carrying migrants off the coast of Dakar.

=== November ===
- 17 November: 2024 Senegalese parliamentary election: The PASTEF party of President Faye and Prime Minister Sonko wins a majority in the National Assembly.
- 29 November: France officially recognises the killing of up to 400 members of the Tirailleurs Sénégalais by the French Army in Thiaroye in 1944 as a massacre.

== Holidays ==
- 1 January - New Year's Day
- 1 April - Easter Monday
- 4 April - Independence Day
- 10 April – Korité
- 1 May - Labour Day
- 20 May - Whit Monday
- 17 June – Tabaski
- 16 July – Tamkharit
- 15 August - Assumption Day
- 22 August - Grand Magal of Touba
- 15 September – The Prophet's Birthday
- 1 November - All Saints' Day
- 25 December - Christmas Day

== Art and entertainment ==
- List of Senegalese submissions for the Academy Award for Best International Feature Film

== Deaths ==
- 9 February – Mame Gorgui Ndiaye, 84 or 85, traditional Senegalese wrestler
- 5 April – Mahammed Dionne, 64, Prime Minister (2014-2019).
- 24 September – Amadou-Mahtar M'Bow, 103, politician, director-general of UNESCO (1974–1987)
