= Marie Khemesse Ngom Ndiaye =

Senegalese doctor and politician

Marie Khemesse Ngom Ndiaye is a Senegalese doctor and politician.

== Education ==
She graduated from Cheikh Anta Diop University in 1991.

== Career ==
During the COVID-19 pandemic in Senegal, she served as Director of Public Health at the Ministry of Health.

In May 2022, she was appointed Minister of Health in the Fourth Sall government, replacing Abdoulaye Diouf Sarr who was sacked.

She was nominated again to her post as Minister of Health on September 17, 2022 under the new cabinet formed by Prime Minister Amadou Bâ.
