= 2016 in Senegal =

- Decades: 1990s; 2000s; 2010s; 2020s
- See also: Other events of 2016; Timeline of Senegalese history

This article lists events during the year 2016 in Senegal.

== Incumbents ==
- President: Macky Sall
- Prime Minister: Mohammed Dionne

== Events ==
=== March ===
- 20 March - The constitution referendum took place
- 23 March - The referendum passes with 63% voting yes to shorter presidential terms.

== Sports ==
- 19 June: US Gorée won the Senegal Premier League football championship

== Links ==
Media related to 2016 in Senegal at Wikimedia Commons
