= Abdoul Aziz Mbaye =

Senegalese diplomat and politician (1954–2021)

Minister of Culture of Senegal
- In office 29 October 2012 – 6 July 2014
- Preceded by: Youssou N'Dour

Personal details
- Born: 18 October 1954 Dakar, French West Africa
- Died: 3 February 2021 (aged 66) Dakar, Senegal
- Party: APR

Abdoul Aziz Mbaye (18 October 1954 – 3 February 2021) was a Senegalese politician and diplomat. He had formerly served as Chief of Staff for President Macky Sall. He was appointed Minister of Culture during a cabinet reshuffle on 29 October 2012, succeeding Youssou N'Dour.

== Biography ==
Mbaye was the first Sub-Saharan African to join the mathematics and physics department of the French National Centre for Scientific Research in 1983. He attended Paris-Sud University, the Université libre de Bruxelles, and the Université catholique de Louvain. A career diplomat, he was a scientific civil servant for the European Commission's European Strategic Program on Research in Information Technology. In 1996, he was appointed advisor of the European Commission to South Africa and Head of the European Union delegation to the Pacific, based in Fiji.

In 1991, Mbaye launched Dakar Science Biennale and was president of Youth Network For Development, a foundation created by Youssou N'Dour. He participated in the foundation of N'Dour's holding, Youssou Ndour Head Office.

Mbaye was a close friend of Macky Sall, and became Chief of Staff upon Sall's election in 2012. On 29 October 2012, Mbaye succeeded N'Dour as Minister of Culture. He was a founding member of the Alliance for the Republic, Senegal's ruling party since Sall's election.

Abdoul Aziz Mbaye died from COVID-19 on 3 February 2021, at the age of 66 during the COVID-19 pandemic in Senegal.
