= 2026 in Senegal =

- Decades: 2000s; 2010s; 2020s
- See also: Other events of 2026; Timeline of Senegalese history

Events in the year 2026 in Senegal.

== Incumbents ==
- President – Bassirou Diomaye Faye
- Prime Minister – Ousmane Sonko (until 22 May); Ahmadou Al Aminou Lo (since 25 May)

== Events ==
=== January ===
- 18 January – Senegal wins the 2025 Africa Cup of Nations in Morocco, defeating Morocco 1-0 on penalties in the final at Prince Moulay Abdellah Stadium in Rabat.
- 28 January – The Confederation of African Football fines the Senegalese Football Federation US$615,000 for unsportsmanlike conduct during the final match against Morocco, fines coach Pape Thiaw US$100,000, and bans him for five 2027 AFCON qualifying matches. Players Iliman Ndiaye and Ismaïla Sarr are also banned from the first two qualifiers.

=== February ===
- 8 February – Fourteen people are arrested in Dakar and Kaolack on suspicion of membership in a child abuse network headed by a French national.
- 10 February – A student dies during protests at Cheikh Anta Diop University in Dakar over delayed financial aid, after clashes with security forces and a fire at a campus building. The university is closed the next day "until further notice."
- 12 February – A patrol boat of the Senegalese Navy capsizes at the mouth of the Senegal River, leaving three sailors missing and 10 others rescued.

=== March ===
- 11 March –
  - The National Assembly passes a bill doubling the maximum prison term for same-sex sexual acts to 10 years and criminalizing the promotion or financing of homosexuality.
  - A soldier is killed while six others are injured in a shootout during an operation to destroy cannabis fields in Kadialock, Casamance.
- 17 March – The Confederation of African Football declares Morocco the winner of the 2025 Africa Cup of Nations final after overturning Senegal's victory in January over the walkout by the latter's players.
- 31 March – President Bassirou Diomaye Faye approves a new anti-LGBT law, doubling the maximum prison sentence for same-sex sexual activities to 10 years, and criminalising the promotion or financing of such acts.

=== April ===
- 4 April – The government announces a ban on non-essential foreign travel by government ministers and senior officials, citing rising oil prices linked to the 2026 Strait of Hormuz crisis.
- 10 April – The first conviction under the new anti-LGBT law is made by a court in Guédiawaye, after a 24-year old man is sentenced to six years' imprisonment and a fine of CFA 2 million ($3,300).

=== May ===
- 23 May –
  - President Faye dismisses prime minister Ousmane Sonko, and dissolves the government, following a debt crisis and stalled negotiations with the International Monetary Fund. Three days later, Sonko is appointed as speaker of parliament.
  - King Mohammed VI of Morocco pardons 15 jailed Senegalese football supporters imprisoned after the disturbances at the 2025 Africa Cup of Nations final, citing the upcoming Eid al-Adha.
- 25 May – President Faye appoints Ahmadou Al Aminou Lo as prime minister.
- 26 May – President Faye issues a pardon to journalist Rene Capain Bassene, who had been convicted for the 2018 killing of 14 loggers in the Bayottes forest in Casamance.

=== June ===
- 1 June – Ousmane Sonko announces that his party, PASTEF, will not participate in the new government following disagreements with President Faye.
- 11 June–19 July – Senegal participates at the 2026 FIFA World Cup.

=== July ===
- 26 July – President Faye launches the Kiiraay Republican Patriots party in Dakar, formalising his split from former prime minister Sonko and PASTEF.

=== October ===
- 31 October–13 November – 2026 Summer Youth Olympics in Dakar.

=== November ===
- 8 November – A boat carrying migrants sinks between Dakar and Saint-Louis on its way to the Canary Islands, killing 39 passengers.
- 8 November – A boat carrying migrants sinks off Yenne, killing at least four passengers.

== Holidays ==
- 1 January – New Year's Day
- 20 – 21 – March – Korité
- 4 April – Independence Day
- 6 April – Easter Monday
- 1 May – Labour Day
- 14 May – Ascension Day
- 25 May – Whit Monday
- 27 May – 30 May – Tabaski
- 25 June – Tamkharit
- 1 August – Grand Magal of Touba
- 15 August – Assumption Day
- 25 August – The Prophet's Birthday
- 1 November – All Saints' Day
- 25 December – Christmas Day

== Deaths ==
- 7 January – Seydou Madani Sy, 92, minister of justice (1986–1990).

== Art and entertainment ==
- List of Senegalese submissions for the Academy Award for Best International Feature Film
