= 2018 in Senegal =

- Decades: 1990s; 2000s; 2010s; 2020s
- See also: Other events of 2018; Timeline of Senegalese history

This article is a list of events in the year 2018 in Senegal.

== Incumbents ==
- President: Macky Sall
- Prime Minister: Mohammed Dionne

== Events ==
=== January ===
- January 6 - 13 people are killed by gunmen in Casamance's Ziguinchor.
- December 6 — Museum of Black Civilisations opens in Dakar after a $34m (£27m) Chinese investment.
