= 2017 in Senegal =

- Decades: 1990s; 2000s; 2010s; 2020s
- See also: Other events of 2017; Timeline of Senegalese history

This article is a list of events in the year 2017 in Senegal.

== Incumbents ==
- President: Macky Sall
- Prime Minister: Mohammed Dionne

== Events ==
- 30 July - The 2017 parliamentary election takes place, which re-elects Mohammed Dionne for Prime Minister of Senegal.

== Sports ==
- Génération Foot won the Senegal Premier League football championship

== Deaths ==
- 25 April – Issa Samb, painter, sculptor, performance artist, playwright and poet (b. 1945).
