= 2010 in Senegal =

- Decades: 1990s; 2000s; 2010s; 2020s
- See also: Other events of 2010; Timeline of Senegalese history

This article is a list of events in the year 2010 in Senegal.

== Incumbents ==
- President: Abdoulaye Wade
- Prime Minister: Souleymane Ndéné Ndiaye

== Events ==
=== April ===
- April 3 - The African Renaissance Monument is inaugurated in the capital of Dakar.
- April 4 - President Wade declares that to celebrate 50 years of independence he will take back all bases occupied by France.

=== October ===
- October 5 - President Wade dismisses Samuel Sarr from his role as energy minister following a week of protests over a power cut. Sarr is replaced with Wade's son.
