= Habib Thiam =

Senegalese politician (1933–2017)

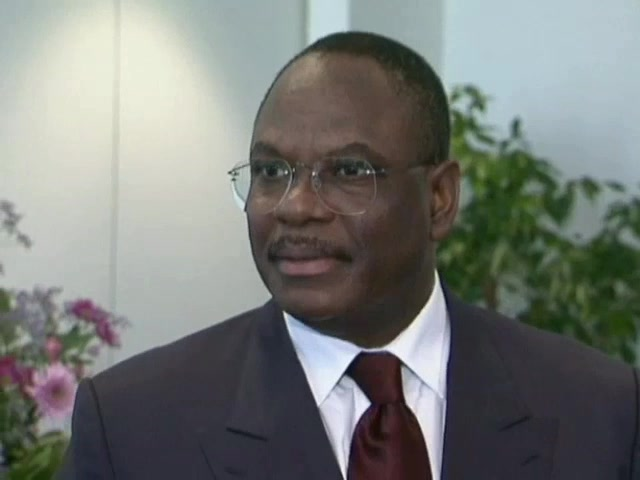

3rd Prime Minister of Senegal
- In office 8 April 1991 – 3 July 1998
- Preceded by: Post abolished
- Succeeded by: Mamadou Lamine Loum
- In office 1 January 1981 – 3 April 1983
- Preceded by: Abdou Diouf
- Succeeded by: Moustapha Niasse

Personal details
- Born: 21 January 1933 Dakar, Senegal
- Died: 26 June 2017 (aged 84) Dakar, Senegal
- Party: Socialist Party
- Spouse: Anne Majken née Hessner

Habib Thiam (21 January 1933 – 26 June 2017) was a Senegalese politician. He served as Prime Minister of Senegal on two occasions, from 1 January 1981 to 3 April 1983, and again from 8 April 1991 until 3 July 1998.

He also served as President of the National Assembly from 1983 to 1984.

== Family ==
He was married to Anne Majken née Hessner, a native of Denmark and former member of the Danish parliament for the Social Democratic Party. They had two daughters.

Political offices
Preceded by Abdou Diouf	Prime Minister of Senegal; 1 January 1981 – 3 April 1983	Succeeded by Moustapha Niasse
Preceded by Post abolished	Prime Minister of Senegal; 8 April 1991 – 3 July 1998	Succeeded by Mamadou Lamine Loum
