= Maïmouna Kane =

Senegalese jurist and politician (1937–2019)

- Born: 13 March 1937; Dakar, Senegal
- Died: 1 March 2019 (aged 81); Paris
- Occupations: Judge and politician

Maïmouna Kane (13 March 1937 − 1 March 2019) was a Senegalese jurist and politician.

== Biography ==
Kane was born in Dakar. She was a judge at the Supreme Court of Senegal, and member of the government under president Abdou Diouf. On 15 March, 1978, she was appointed State Secretary to the Prime Minister responsible for the Status of Women. She was appointed alongside Caroline Faye Diop, making them the first women appointed ministers in Senegal. She was promoted to Minister of Social Development by Moustapha Niasse on 5 April 1983, serving until 2 January 1986.

Kane died in Paris on 1 March 2019.
