= Abdoul Mbaye =

Senegalese prime minister

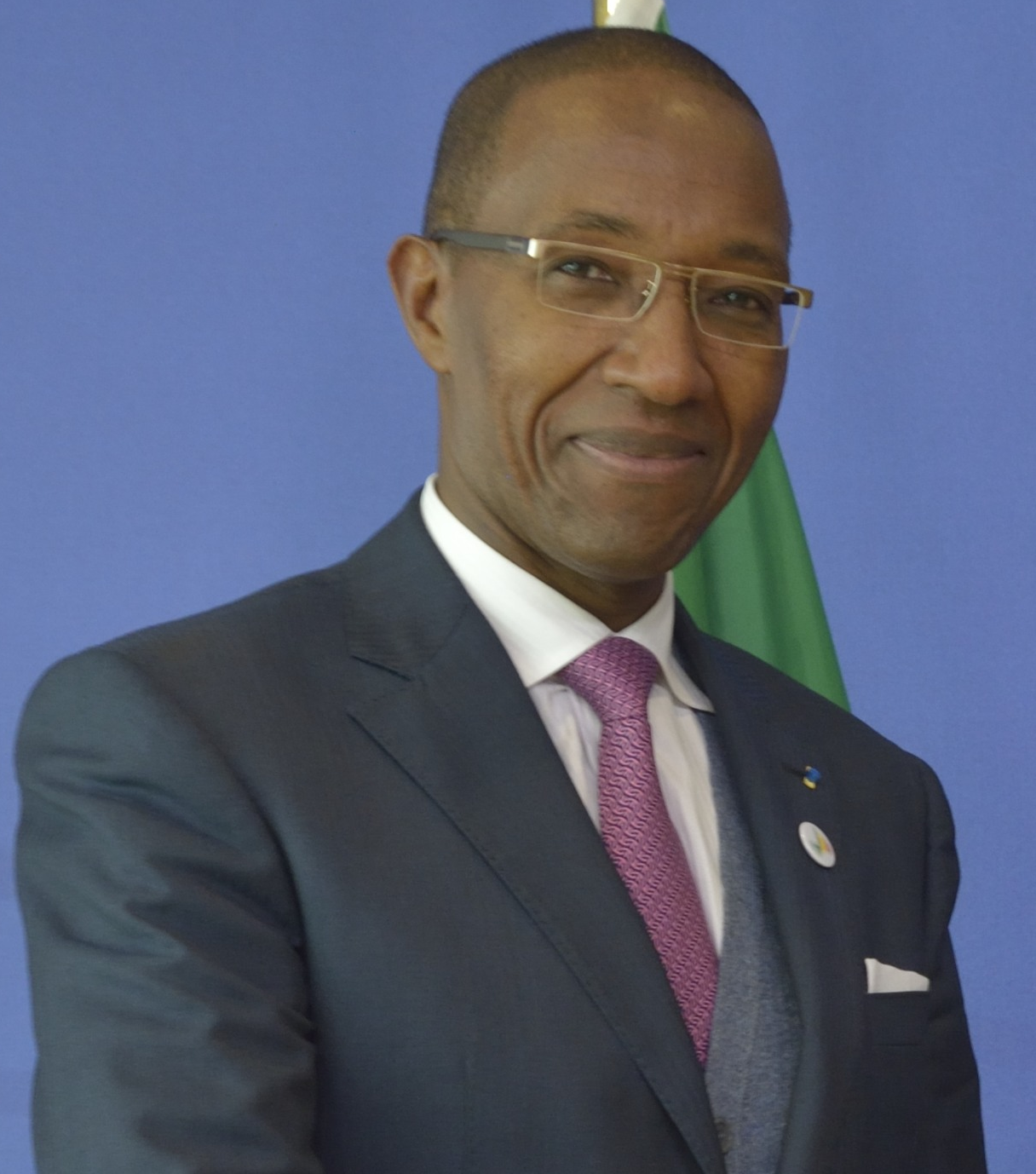

Prime Minister of Senegal
- In office 5 April 2012 – 1 September 2013
- President: Macky Sall
- Preceded by: Souleymane Ndéné Ndiaye
- Succeeded by: Aminata Touré

Personal details
- Born: 13 April 1953 (age 73) Dakar, Senegal
- Party: Independent
- Education: University of Dakar; HEC Paris; University of Paris

Abdoul Mbaye is a Senegalese banker and politician who was Prime Minister of Senegal from April 2012 until September 2013. He is a technocrat who was appointed prime minister by President Macky Sall following the latter's win in the 2012 presidential election.

== Early life ==
Abdoul Aziz Mbaye was born on 13 April 1953, in Dakar. He is the son of judge Keba Mbaye, dead in 2007, who was the first president of the Supreme Court of Senegal, president of the Constitutional Council, a member of the International Olympic Committee and of the International Court of Justice. Abdoul Mbaye is the eldest in a family of three brothers and five sisters, including Cheikh Tidiane Mbaye, CEO of Sonatel.

Abdoul Mbaye studied in Senegal at the University of Dakar and at France's HEC Paris and Paris-Sorbonne University. He is also a graduate of Cheikh Anta Diop University.

== Banking career ==
In 1976 he joined the Central Bank of West African States as an economist in the research department, before becoming the International Monetary Fund's Director of the Division of Planning in 1981. He also worked in Ivory Coast at some point. He then took over as CEO of Banque de l'Habitat du Sénégal in 1982. In 1990 he was a part of the restructuring team for BIAO-Sénégal, then becoming CEO of the re-modeled Compagnie Bancaire de l'Afrique Occidentale, where the bank initiated the first company leasing in Senegal and started the first investment fund in west Africa.

He was also the president of the Federation of Associations of Banks and Financial Institutions of the West African Economic and Monetary Union and the Senegalese Professional Association of Banks and Financial Institutions and the head of Attijari Bank Senegal (majority owned by Attijariwafa), which he acquired as the head of a consortium to turn around the ailing bank. He also worked with the IMF in developing regulations for investment funds in west Africa. At the African Finance and Investment Group, he was an administrator.

== Prime minister ==
On 3 April 2012, he was appointed Prime Minister of Senegal by the newly elected President Macky Sall. He formally took over the office from the outgoing Prime Minister, Souleymane Ndéné Ndiaye, on 5 April 2012.

=== Cabinet ===
The composition of a 25-member government headed by Mbaye was announced in the late hours of 4 April. The government consists of the opposition parties who supported Sall in the election which each got two portfolios: Socialist Party of Senegal of Ousmane Tanor Dieng, the Alliance of the Forces of Progress of Moustapha Niasse and the Rewmi party of Idrissa Seck.

- Ministry of Foreign Affairs: Alioune Badara Cissé
- Ministry of Interior: Mbaye Ndiaye
- Ministry of Health of Social Action: Eva Marie Coll Seck
- Ministry of Defense: Augustin Tine
- Ministry of Justice: Aminata Touré
- Ministry of Finance and the Economy: Amadou Kane
- Ministry of Culture and Tourism: Youssou Ndour
- Ministry of Woman, Children and Female Entrepreneurship: Mariama Sarr
- Ministry of National Education: Ibrahima Sall
- Ministry of Agriculture and Rural Equipment: Benoît Sambou
- Ministry of Regional Planning and Local Government: Cheikh Bamba Dièye
- Ministry of Commerce, Industry and Handicrafts: Mata Sy Diallo
- Ministry of Livestock: Aminata Mbengue Ndiaye
- Ministry of Fisheries and Maritime Affairs: Pape Diouf
- Ministry of Infrastructure of Transport: Mor Ngom
- Ministry of Energy and Mines: Aly Ngouille Ndiaye
- Ministry of Youth, Training and Employment: Aly Koto Ndiaye
- Ministry of Sports: El Hadji Malick Gackou
- Ministry of Urban Development and Housing: Khoudia Mbaye
- Ministry of Higher Education and Research and spokesman for the government: Serigne Mbaye Thiam
- Ministry of Ecology and Nature Protection: Haïdar El Ali
- Ministry of Public Service, Labour and Relations with Institutions: Mansour Sy
- Ministry of Water and Sanitation: Oumar Guèye
- Ministry of Communication, Telecommunications and Information Technology and Communication: Abou Lô
- Minister Delegate to the Minister of Economy and Finance for the Budget: Abdoulaye Daouda Diallo

Political offices
Preceded by Souleymane Ndéné Ndiaye	Prime Minister of Senegal; 2012–2013	Succeeded by Aminata Touré
