= Abdoulaye Diouf Sarr =

Senegalese politician

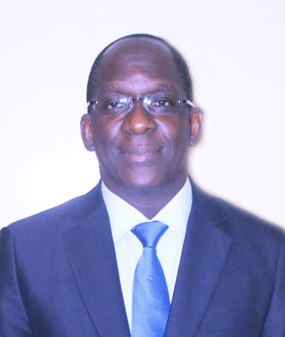
Abdoulaye Diouf Sarr in July 2018.

Abdoulaye Diouf Sarr (born 20th-century) is a Senegalese politician.

== Political career ==
He was Minister of Health until he was sacked by President Macky Sall on 26 May 2022 following a hospital fire that killed 11 babies in the city of Tivaouane. He was replaced by Marie Khemesse Ngom Ndiaye.

== See also ==
- Diouf family
