= Al Ousseynou Sène =

Senegalese footballer and coach (died 2025)

Al Ousseynou Sène (died December 2025) was a Senegalese football player and coach.

A midfielder, Sène played for US Ouakam during the 1989–90 season. He also played nine times for the Senegal national team in 1996–97. He was a coach for ASC HLM until February 2025. On 13 December 2025, it was announced that he had died.
