= Amy Ndiaye =

Senegalese politician

Amy Ndiaye is a Senegalese politician who is a member of the National Assembly from the ruling Benno Bokk Yakaar coalition.

== Attack ==
On 1 December 2022, a pregnant Ndiaye was involved in a fight with two fellow MPs in the chamber while it was in session, being kicked and slapped. Mamadou Niang and Massata Samb were sentenced to six months in prison and ordered to pay Ndiaye five million CFA franc in compensation.
