= Hann Forest and Zoological Park =

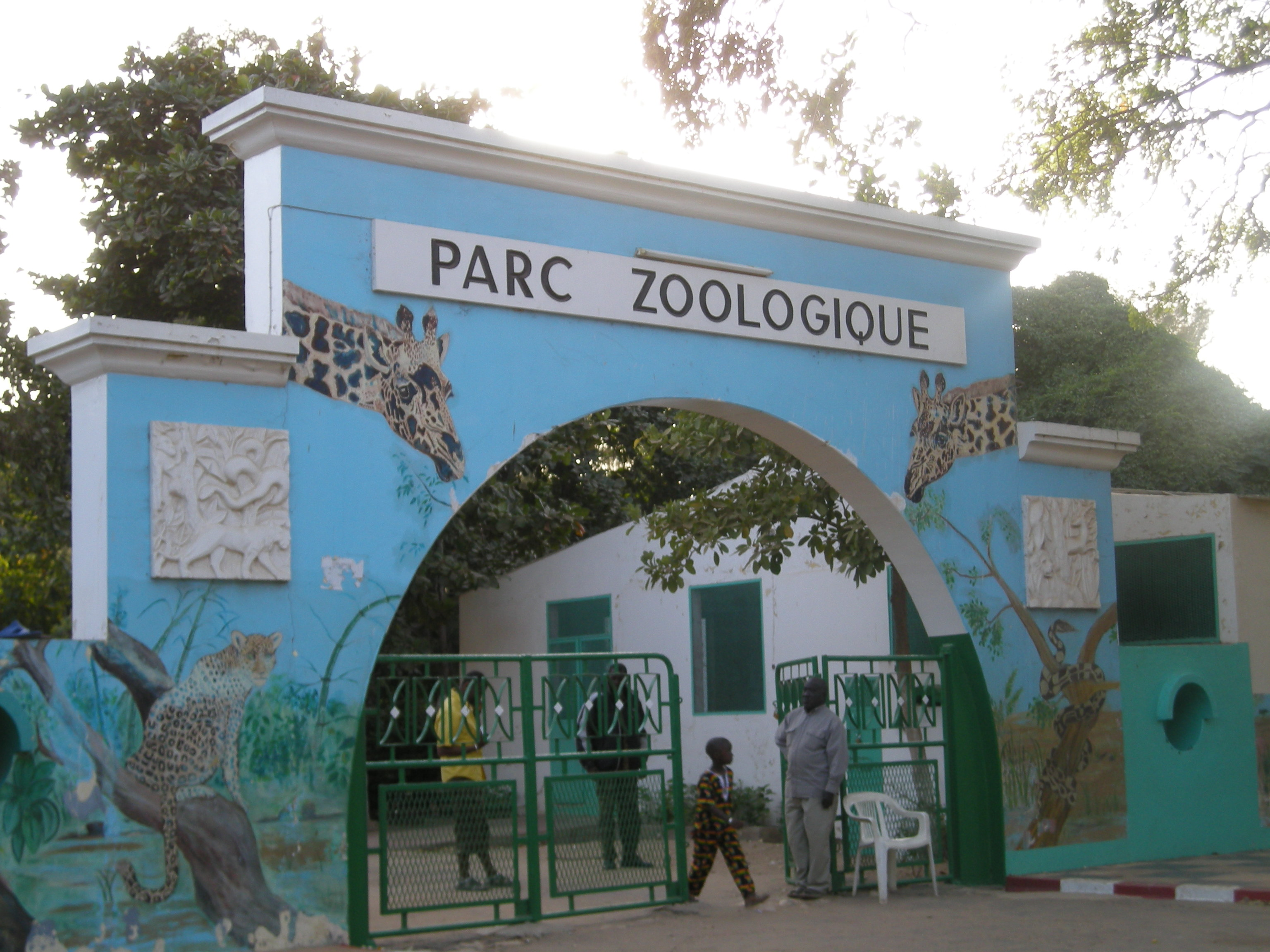
- Entrance of the Hann Forest and Zoological Park
- Interactive map of Hann Forest and Zoological Park
- 14°43′32″N 17°26′01″W
- Location: Dakar, Senegal

The Hann Forest and Zoological Park (French: Parc forestier et zoologique de Hann) is a nature reserve located in Dakar, the capital of the African country of Senegal, in the Hann Bel-Air commune.

== History ==
In 1903, Martial Henri Merlin, a French colonial administrator, decided to create a garden and a plant nursery in all the colonies of French West Africa, this year, the surface of the garden was 73 hectares, in 1904, a Central Agronomic Station was created, in 1908, In 1912, trials were carried out for the introduction of species to the zoological park such as 8500 coconut trees from Benin, 1500 filaos and 3500 eucalyptus trees. Between 1914 and 1918, the fruit orchard was created where critical fruits, bananas and pineapples were planted. In 1933, the Melaleuca leucadendron plant was introduced to the zoo to reforest the swamp areas of the park. In 1935, the zoo is opened to the public and an aquarium is built. In 1940, the zoo served as a shelter for some residents of the city during the Battle of Dakar. In 1947, the arboretum of the zoological park was created, with the intention of conserving plants native to French West Africa. The first director of the zoo was Amadou Mactar Dieng, other zoo directors have also been commanders such as Lamine Guèye and colonels such as Omar Diagne, Kondé Sylla, Oumar Diaw, Madeleine Cissé and Mactar Fall. In 2002, it was reported that 134 animals including hyenas and gazelles were in the zoo, in 2013, the number of animals in the zoo was 187.

== Species ==
The zoo has crocodiles, lions, Gambian geese, python reptiles, dingoes, guineafowls, dromedaries, turtles, and pelicans, as well as different species of primates such as chimpanzees and cynocephalic primates, the zoo also has several roosters, parrots and pigeons. The zoo also has a botanical garden with many floral species.

== Ethnobotanical Garden ==
The ethnobotanical garden (French: Jardin ethnobotanique) was inaugurated in 1934, it is divided into thirteen sectors and occupies 2.5 hectares, it preserves more than 250 types of plants including fruits, vegetables and medicinal plants.

== Environmental Education Center ==
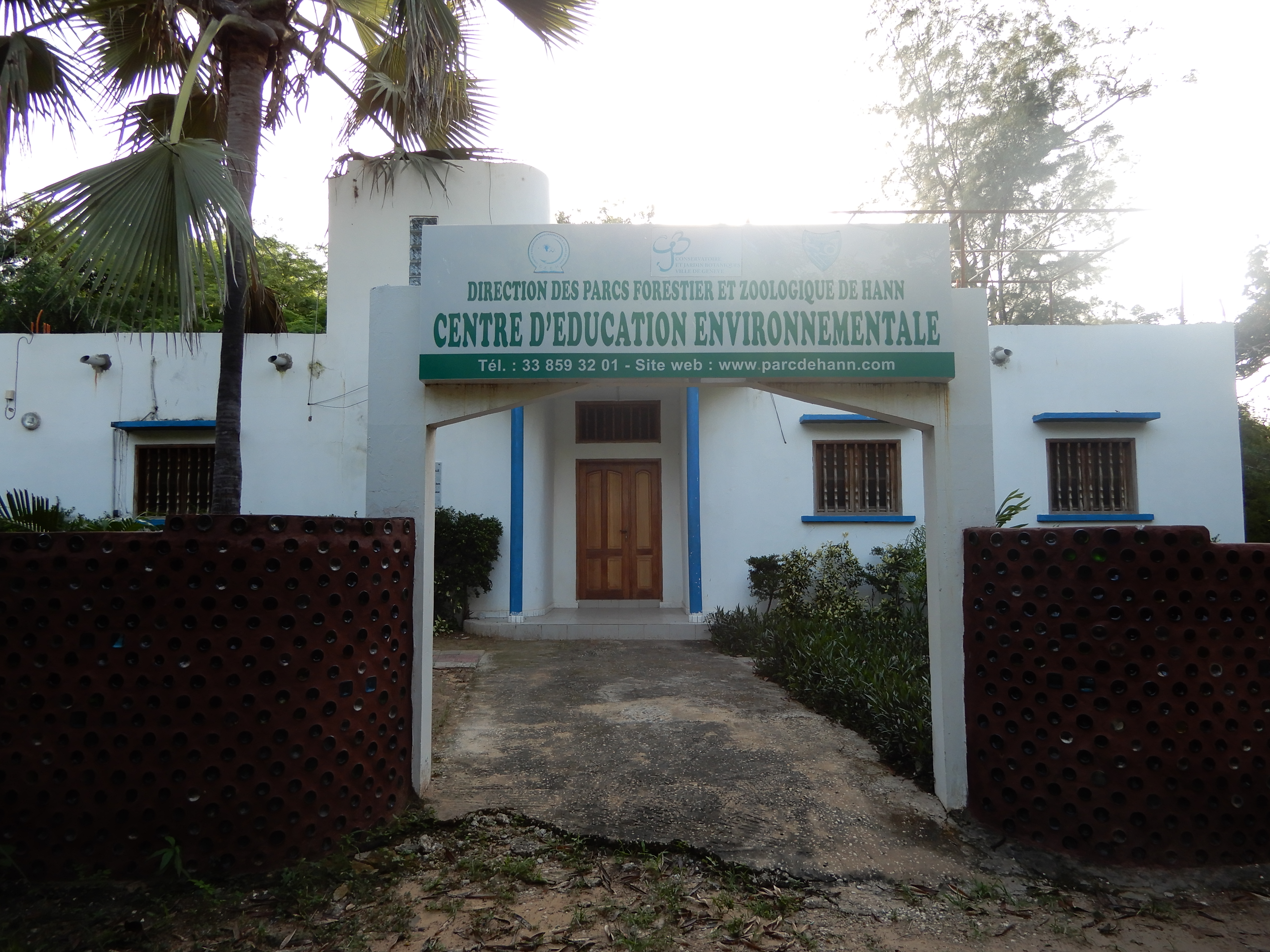

In October 2003, an educational center (French: Centre d'éducation environnementale) was inaugurated in the zoo for students to learn about environmental issues.
