= Mamadou Bamba Ndiaye =

Senegalese politician (1949–2020)

Mamado Bamba Ndiaye
- Born: 4 April 1949; Dakar, French Senegal
- Died: 3 July 2020 (aged 71)
- Occupation: Politician

Mamado Bamba Ndiaye (4 April 1949 – 3 July 2020) was a Senegalese journalist, islamologist, and also a politician.

== Career ==
He served as Minister of Religious Affairs under the presidency of Abdoulaye Wade from 2000 to 2012. He supported Malick Gakou as Parti Grand leader in 2012, and Macky Sall for President of Senegal in 2019. Ndiaye was also director of the daily newspaper Le Messager.

== Death ==
Ndiaye died on 3 July 2020, in Dakar, at the age of 71 from COVID-19.
