= COVID-19 vaccination in Senegal =

Plan to immunize against COVID-19

- Date: 23 February 2021 - present
- Location: Senegal
- Cause: COVID-19 pandemic

On 23 February 2021, Senegal began its national vaccination program against the COVID-19. As of 10 March, 68,205 people in Senegal have been able to be vaccinated.

== History ==
=== Timeline ===
==== February 2021 ====
On 23 February 2021, Senegal began its national vaccination program against COVID-19 using the Sinopharm BIBP vaccine.

==== March 2021 ====
By the end of the month 309,128 vaccine doses had been administered, including 260,754 first doses.

==== April 2021 ====
By the end of the month 470,009 vaccine doses had been administered, including 406,981 first doses.

==== May 2021 ====
By the end of the month more than half a million vaccine doses had been administered, including 456,135 first doses.

==== June 2021 ====
By the end of the month 0.7 million vaccine doses had been administered, including 0.5 million first doses.

==== July 2021 ====
By the end of the month 1.1 million vaccine doses had been administered while 806,510 persons had been vaccinated.

==== August 2021 ====
By the end of the month 1.6 million vaccine doses had been administered while 1,167,364 persons had been vaccinated.

==== September 2021 ====
By the end of the month 1.8 million vaccine doses had been administered while 1,251,403 persons had been vaccinated.

==== October 2021 ====
By the end of the month 1.9 million vaccine doses had been administered, including 1.3 million first doses, and 13% of the targeted population had been fully vaccinated.

==== November 2021 ====
By the end of the month 1.9 million vaccine doses had been administered, including 1.3 million first doses, and 13% of the targeted population had been fully vaccinated.

==== December 2021 ====
By the end of the month two million vaccine doses had been administered, including 1.4 million first doses, and 14% of the targeted population had been fully vaccinated.

==== January 2022 ====
By the end of the month two million vaccine doses had been administered, including 1.4 million first doses, and 14% of the targeted population had been fully vaccinated.

==== February 2022 ====
By the end of the month 2.5 million vaccine doses had been administered, including 1.5 million first doses, while more than a million persons had been fully vaccinated.

==== March 2022 ====
By the end of the month 2.5 million vaccine doses had been administered, including 1.5 million first doses, while more than a million persons had been fully vaccinated.

==== April 2022 ====
By the end of the month 2.5 million vaccine doses had been administered, including 1.5 million first doses, while more than a million persons had been fully vaccinated.

== Vaccine in order ==
Vaccine	Approval	Deployment
Sinopharm BIBP	Yes	23 February 2021
Oxford–AstraZeneca	Yes	Yes

== Progress ==
Cumulative vaccinations The following figure presents the cumulative number of people in Senegal who have been vaccinated (vertical axis) since the starting date of vaccinations in Senegal (horizontal axis: date)

View source data.
