= Mamadou Lamine Loum =

Senegalese political figure (born 1952)

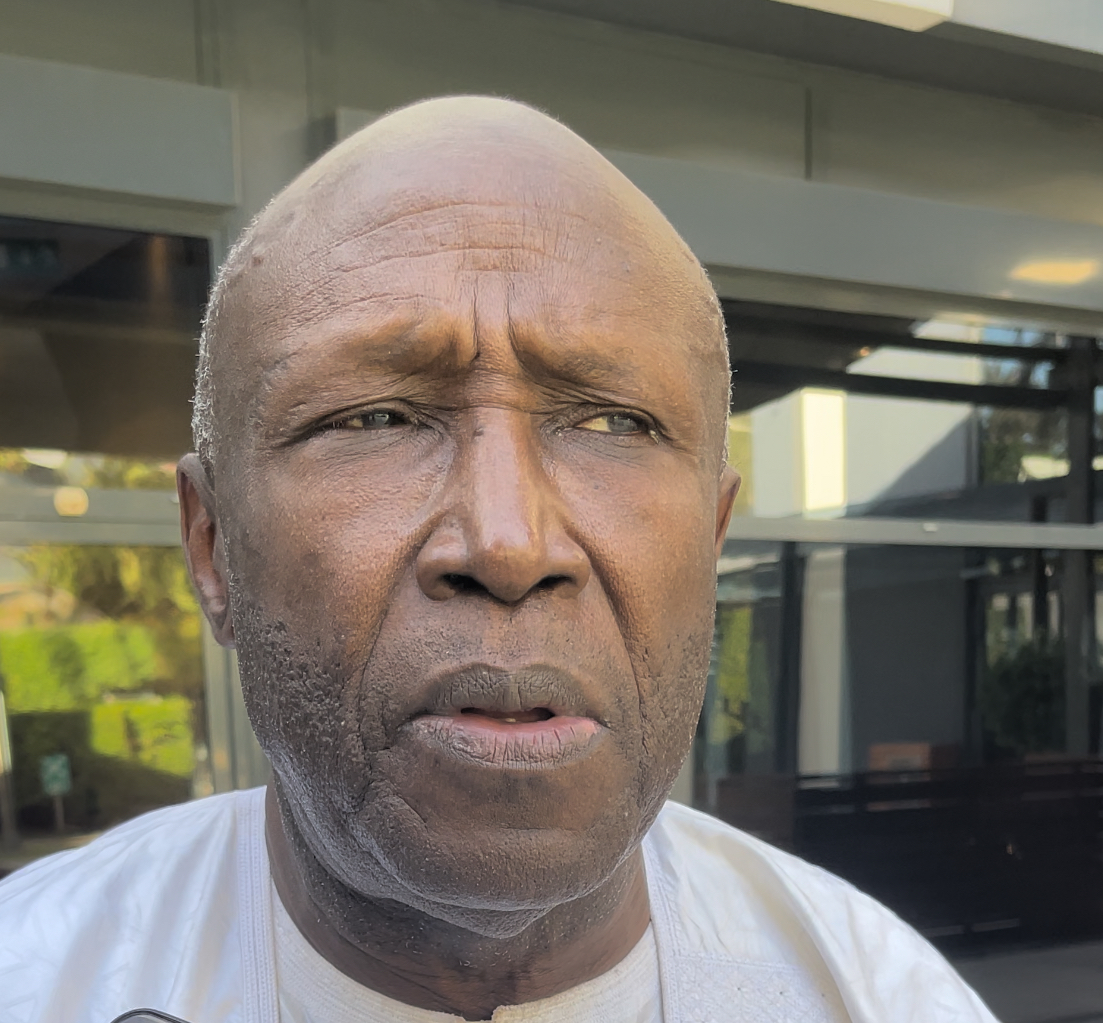

4th Prime Minister of Senegal
- In office 3 July 1998 – 5 April 2000
- President: Abdou Diouf; Abdoulaye Wade
- Preceded by: Habib Thiam
- Succeeded by: Moustapha Niasse

Minister of the Economy and Finance
- In office January 1998 – July 1998
- Preceded by: Papa Ousmane Sakho
- Succeeded by: Moustapha Diagne

Personal details
- Born: 3 February 1952 (age 74) Mboss
- Party: Socialist Party
- Profession: Politician

Mamadou Lamine Loum (Arabic: محمدُ الآمين الأم; born February 3, 1952) is a Senegalese political figure. Considered a technocrat, he served as Prime Minister of Senegal from 3 July 1998 to 5 April 2000.

== Biography ==
Loum was born in Mboss. He graduated from the Faculty of Law of the University Cheikh Anta Diop (UCAD) and the Ecole Nationale d'Administration (ENA). After completing his education at Senegal's National School of Administration and Magistracy, he became an inspector at the Treasury in 1977 and then Treasurer-General of Senegal in 1984. He was Director-General of the Treasury from 1991 to 1993, then Minister-Delegate for the Budget, working under the Minister of Finance, from June 1993 to January 1998. Considered "a rigorous economist," he successfully negotiated debt rescheduling with the Club of Paris. He was named Minister of Finance and Economy in January 1998, serving in that position for six months until being appointed Prime Minister.

Political offices
Preceded by Habib Thiam	Prime Minister of Senegal; 1998–2000	Succeeded by Moustapha Niasse
