= Mamadou Niang (politician) =

Senegalese politician

Mamadou Niang is a Senegalese politician who is a member of the National Assembly.

== Attack ==
On 1 December 2022, Niang and fellow opposition lawmaker Massata Samb were involved in a fight with pregnant MP Amy Ndiaye in the chamber while it was in session. Niang and Samb were sentenced to six months in prison and ordered to pay Ndiaye five million CFA franc in compensation.
