= MV Le Joola =

Senegalese ferry which sank off the coast of The Gambia in 26 September 2002

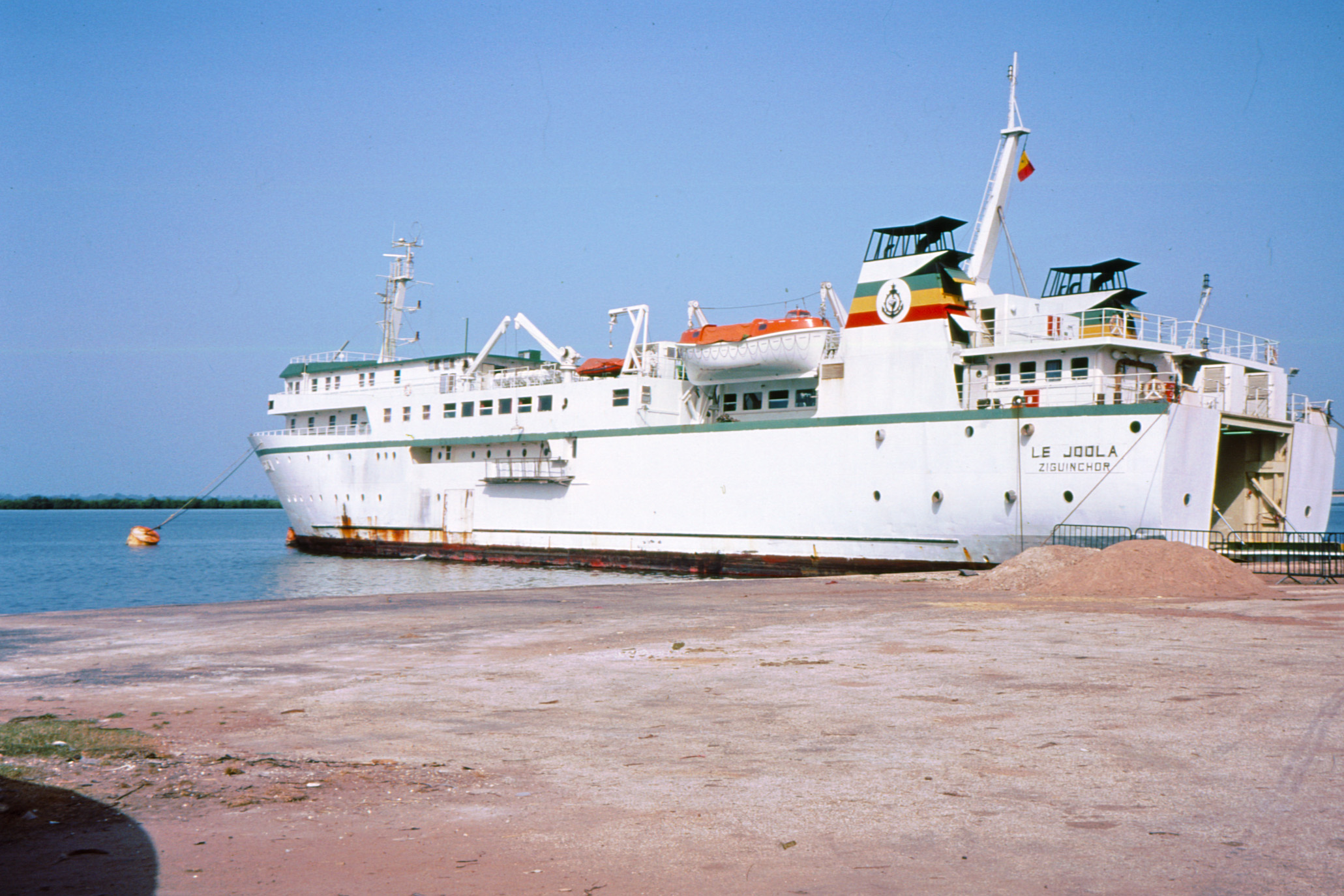
- Ferry Le Joola at Ziguinchor, Senegal in 1991

History

Republic Of Senegal
- Name: Le Joola
- Owner: Republique Senegal, Ministere de l'Equipement, Dakar / Senegal
- Operator: Armed Forces of Senegal
- Port of registry: Senegal
- Route: Dakar to Casamance
- Builder: Schiffswerft Germersheim (Germany)
- Launched: 22 March 1990
- Completed: 12 November 1990
- Out of service: 13 September 2001 – 10 September 2002; Mechanical damage repair and replacement of the port side engine
- Identification: IMO number: 9019901; Callsign: 6VYZ
- Fate: Capsized and sank in rough seas 26 September 2002
- Notes: The ship was overloaded with an estimated 1,863 aboard at the time of disaster.

General characteristics
- Class & type: Roll-on/roll-off ferry
- Tonnage: 2,087 GT
- Length: 79.5 m (260 ft 10 in)
- Beam: 12 m (39 ft 4 in)
- Draft: 3.1 m (10 ft 2 in)
- Capacity: 536 passengers; 35 cars
- Crew: 44

MV Le Joola was a Senegalese government-owned roll-on/roll-off ferry that capsized off the coast of The Gambia on 26 September 2002, with 1,863 deaths and 64 survivors. The majority of passengers were Senegalese and French, including 854 to 923 French-Senegalese dual nationals on board. It is thought to be the third-worst peacetime disaster in maritime history, and the worst in the 21st century.

The ship was plying the route from Ziguinchor in the Casamance region to the Senegalese capital, Dakar, when it ran into a violent storm, farther out to sea than it was licensed to travel. The estimated 2,000 passengers aboard (about half of whom lacked tickets) would have amounted to nearly four times the ship's design load. The large numbers sleeping on-deck (and thus above its center of buoyancy) added further instability. Rescue operations did not start for several hours.

A government inquiry principally blamed negligence, and accusations were directed at both the Senegalese president Abdoulaye Wade and premier Mame Madior Boye.

== MV Le Joola ==
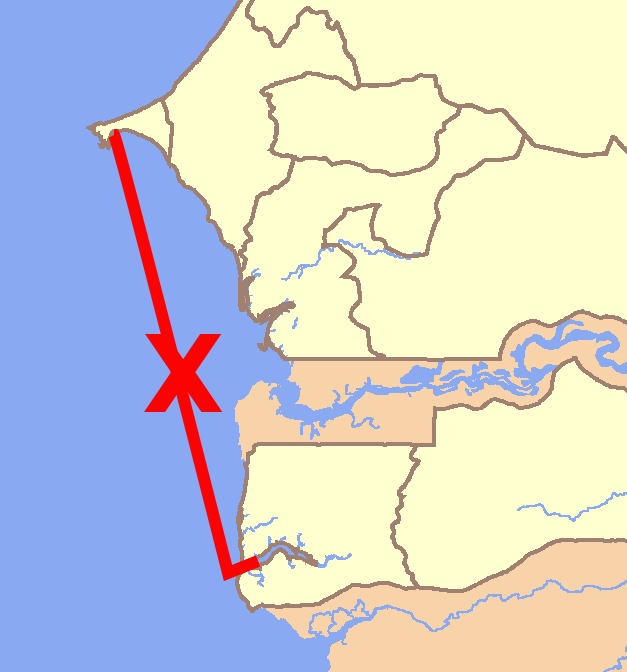
Route and approximate location of the sinking of Le Joola.

The ship was named Le Joola after the Jola people of southern Senegal. Constructed in Germany and delivered in 1990, it was 79 m (259 ft 2 in) long and 12 m (39 ft 4 in) wide, weighed 1,400 tons, had two motors, and was equipped with some of the latest safety equipment available at the time of the disaster. Le Joola usually traveled twice a week and often carried women who sold mangoes and palm oil in Dakar. At the time of the disaster, the ship had been out of service for almost a year undergoing repairs, which included replacement of the port engine.

The ship was introduced as a solution to Senegal's geographical challenge, connecting the separated Casamance region to the rest of the country. Due to the presence of The Gambia between Casamance and the central/northern Senegal, travel options were limited to a damaged eastern road or a western sea route. However, road attacks during a separatist rebellion made the boat journey safer. In 1995, the military took control of the Joola to verify passenger identities, yet overcrowding remained a persistent issue.

== Voyage and incident ==
At about 1:30 pm on 26 September 2002, Le Joola started from Ziguinchor in the Casamance region on one of its frequent voyages between southern Senegal and Dakar. More than 1,928 people officially crowded onto the ferry, which had a capacity of 536 passengers. 185 people boarded the ship from Carabane, an island where there was no formal port of entry or exit for passengers. The exact number of passengers remains unknown (some Senegalese organizations put the number at more than 2,000), but there were 1,034 travelers with tickets. The rest of the passengers were either not required to hold tickets (children aged less than 5) or had been permitted to travel for free, as often happens. A surviving freight worker noted that from the number of tickets sold, he could see that there would be a significant overcrowding situation aboard the vessel. Reportedly, as it set sail from Ziguinchor, Le Joola was already tilting.

The last call from the ferry staff was broadcast to a maritime security center in Dakar at 10 pm and reported good traveling conditions. At around 11 pm, the ship moved into a storm off the coast of Gambia. As a result of the rough seas and wind, the ferry capsized, throwing passengers and cargo into the sea, all within five minutes.

Survivors recalled the ferry overturning swiftly during heavy rain, with one describing the boat tilting before capsizing, causing a flood. Another survivor recounted clinging to the ferry's keel after swimming through a partially open window, while another described being tossed by winds and waves until finding refuge on part of the overturned vessel.

Survivors faced challenges such as finding life jackets and escaping from the submerged vessel, with some resorting to smashing portholes to escape. In an interview, Ismaila Ndaw, a retired diver from the Senegalese Navy who had been in charge of security on the Joola until shortly before it sank, recalled that the life jackets had been deliberately bound tightly together to prevent passengers from accessing them, noting "It was a mess: Any time there was a small incident, everyone would rush to take one." While many of the ship's passengers may have died during or immediately after the capsizing, a large number probably survived, only to drown while awaiting rescue. In an interview, one passenger mentioned that approximately 20 individuals had succeeded in climbing onto the hull and remained there for several hours. They could hear cries from beneath them, indicating that some passengers were still alive in air pockets that were keeping the boat buoyant.

Investigations later revealed that no alarm had been triggered, and no distress signal had been transmitted to Dakar or Ziguinchor. It was not until around 7 am that authorities learned of the disaster from passing vessels. Even then, their response was delayed. According to a report by Senegalese investigators, the Senegalese Air Force did not dispatch search-and-rescue aircraft until nearly noon. Instead, it was local fishermen with pirogues that initially recovered bodies and rescued survivors. They were able to rescue a few people but also recovered several bodies that were floating around Le Joola. At 2 pm, they rescued a 15-year-old boy. The boy confirmed that there were still many people trapped alive inside the ship; there were reports of noises and screaming coming from within. Only 64 passengers survived. Of more than 600 women aboard, only one woman, Mariama Diouf, survived; she was pregnant at the time. Among the first responders was diver Ismaila Ndaw. Upon reaching the vessel in the afternoon and entering through the restaurant area, he was confronted with hundreds of bodies, some still clasping hands. Moving towards the bow, Ndaw encountered the sealed first-class cabins, which remained unflooded. Inside, some passengers gestured through the port windows. However, Ndaw explained that they lacked the necessary equipment, such as welding torches, to breach the hull, and opening the cabin doors risked causing the already-floating boat to sink. Ndaw noted that none of the passengers he saw alive in the cabins were rescued.

Le Joola remained capsized but afloat until around 3 pm, at which point it finally sank stern first, taking with it those who were unable to get out of the ship.

== Causes ==
Despite investigations by both the Senegalese government and French authorities prompted by the deaths of hundreds French citizens, the exact causes of the incident have remained unknown as of 2022. In 2022, a Paris court revised the estimated number of French victims on board, reporting 854 and 923 Franco-Senegalese killed on board. The multitude of mistakes that contributed to the tragedy have been extensively documented: Le Joola lacked a sailing license; its crew neglected to consult the weather forecaster before departure; and the captain frequently failed to ensure proper balance of the ferry. Potential factors such as engine failure, navigational errors, adverse weather conditions, inadequate maintenance, and overcrowding—or a combination thereof—have been suggested as likely causes. Reports revealed that only one of the ship's two engines was operational.

In 2003, Senegal closed its investigation, attributing blame to the captain, Issa Diarra, who died during the incident. Similarly, French courts terminated a lengthy probe that implicated seven Senegalese officials, citing lack of jurisdiction for Paris.

While rough seas and wind were responsible directly for the capsizing, the ferry was built only to travel in coastal waters but was sailing beyond this coastal limit when it capsized. Overcrowding is one of the most commonly mentioned factors for the disaster, both for the capsizing and the great number of deaths (since there were insufficient life jackets). Due to the heat and claustrophobic conditions below deck, as many passengers as possible usually slept on the upper level, making the ship more unstable. The ship was only 12 years old and was built to be in service for at least 30 years but had suffered a number of technical problems in the years before it capsized. These problems are now attributed to poor maintenance by its owners and not to any design or manufacturing flaws.

== Deaths ==
At least 1,863 people died, although the exact number will never be known due to a large number of unticketed passengers aboard. At least 444 children were among the victims. Among the dead were 1,201 male victims (61.5%) and 682 female victims (34.9%). The gender of 70 victims is unknown. The majority of passengers were Senegalese, including 854 to 923 Senegalese-French nationals on board. The dead included passengers from at least 11 countries beside Senegal: Cameroon, Guinea, Ghana, Nigeria, France, Spain, Norway, Belgium, Lebanon, Switzerland, and the Netherlands.

On 28 September 2002, environmental activist Haïdar El Ali and his diving team explored the disaster area. They saw no survivors, but many bodies of men, women and children inside the ship. 300 corpses trapped inside were freed. Another 100 that were around the ship were also recovered. 551 dead bodies were recovered in total. Of that number, 93 were identifiable and given back to families. The remaining bodies were put to rest in specially-constructed cemeteries in Kabadio, Kantene, Mbao, and on the Gambian coast. National funerals were held on 11 October 2002, at the Esplanade du Souvenir in Dakar.

== Repercussions and reparations ==
The Senegalese government initially offered families a payment of about US$22,000 per victim and dismissed several officials, but no one has ever been prosecuted, and the official report was finalized a year after the disaster. Officials were charged with failure to respond quickly enough to the disaster, including high-ranking members of the Armed Forces of Senegal who were transferred to other posts. Despite this, little information was ever publicized about those who allowed the ferry to be overloaded or maintained poorly. Premier Mame Madior Boye was dismissed by President Abdoulaye Wade after the disaster with much of her cabinet, reportedly for mishandling the rescue. In the 2007 election, Wade's rival and former Premier, Moustapha Niasse, accused Wade of covering up their responsibility for the disaster. Families of victims, many of whom have been unwilling or unable to claim reparation, have continued to be critical of the government concerning its management of the rescue, the operation of the ferry which resulted in the disaster, and the reparation process.

The families of French victims refused the 2003 reparations offers, and have pursued the Senegalese authorities in French courts. On 12 September 2008, French judge Jean-Wilfrid Noël delivered an indictment of nine Senegalese officials, including Boye and former Army Chief of Staff General Babacar Gaye. Senegalese official and popular reaction against these charges coming from the former colonial power have been hostile, with the Senegalese government issuing an arrest warrant for Noël in return.

Associations representing victims from Senegal and France have advocated for the recovery of the sunken vessel, which lies at a depth of approximately 20 meters (60 feet) and is believed to contain numerous bodies.

Senegalese footballer Aliou Cissé lost 12 members of his family in the incident, and his team Birmingham City, in England, displayed a large Senegalese flag to remember the midfielder's family and the other people who lost their lives.

== Media ==
A documentary by Senegalese journalist Papa Moctar Selane was broadcast on the ninth anniversary of the tragedy, 26 September 2011. The documentary detailed the story of some of the survivors and questioned the slow rescue work.

For the 20th anniversary, directors Efrem Gebreab and Nicola Milne produced a documentary, "The Joola: Africa’s Titanic," for BBC World Service.

== Memorials ==
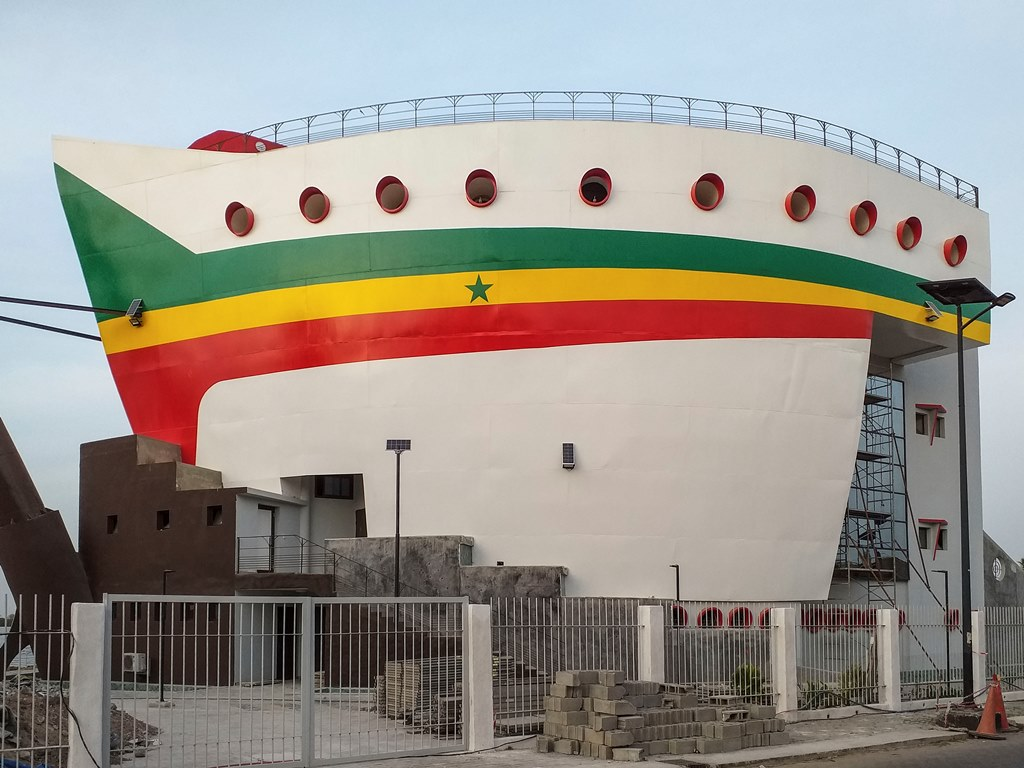
The Le Joola Memorial Museum

In Ziguinchor, a customary observance occurs annually to commemorate the sinking of the vessel, with community members assembling to collectively offer prayers.

In December 2019, Senegalese authorities agreed to build a national Le Joola memorial museum in Ziguinchor, at an estimated cost three billion CFA francs. In September 2023, it was reported that the museum was nearing completion. Designed to honor the victims while providing educational insights, it is expected to feature exhibits on maritime history in Casamance, the shipwreck, and lessons learned from the disaster. Construction was initiated in December 2019 by Eiffage Senegal. Relics from the ship, including propellers, were reported as being gathered with the assistance of the navy.

In January 2024, Prime Minister Amadou Ba inaugurated the Joola Boat Memorial in Ziguinchor in the presence of the Minister of Culture and Historical Heritage, Aliou Sow, and several government members.

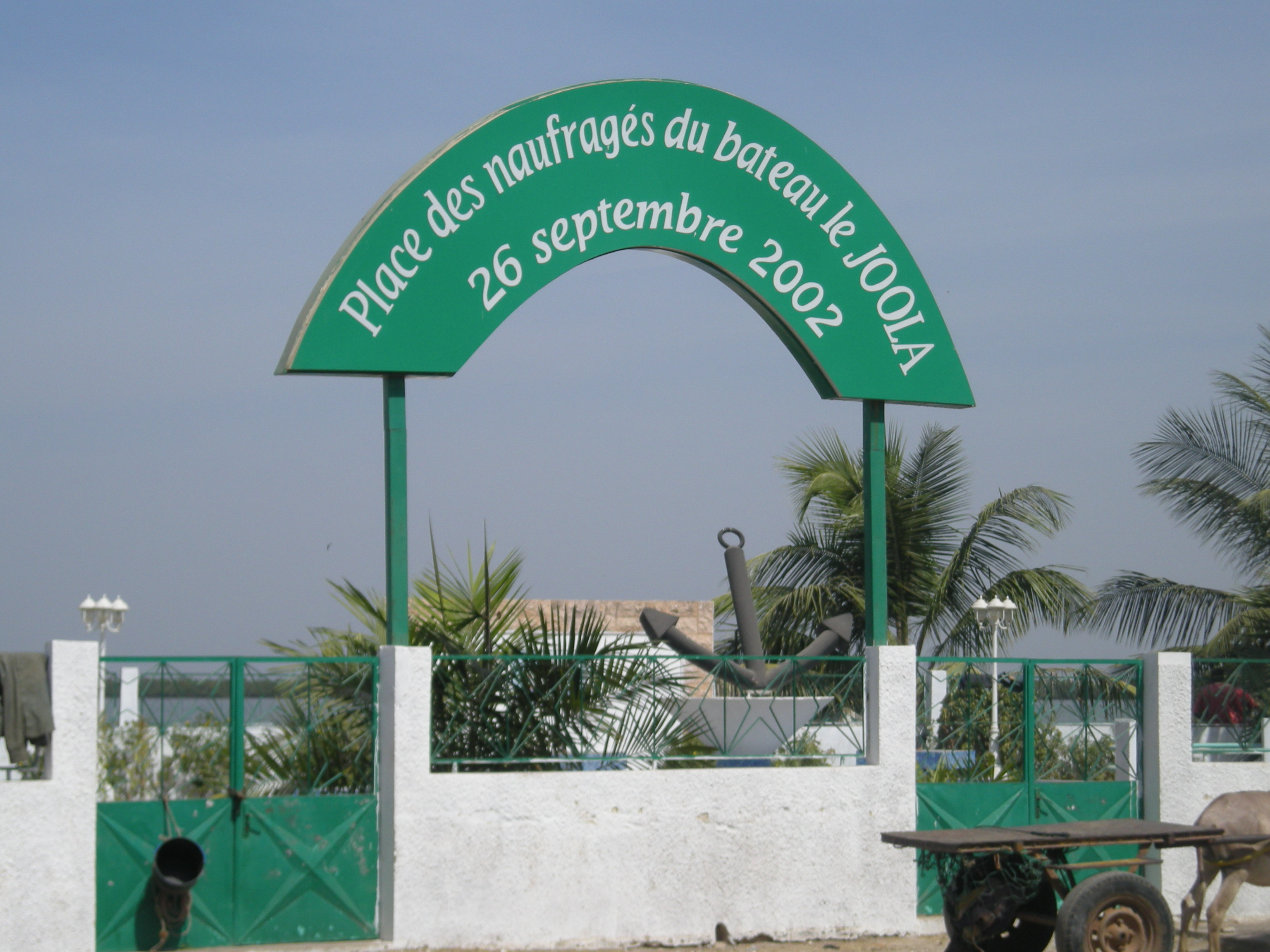
Memorial plaza in Ziguinchor near the place passengers embarked on Le Joola

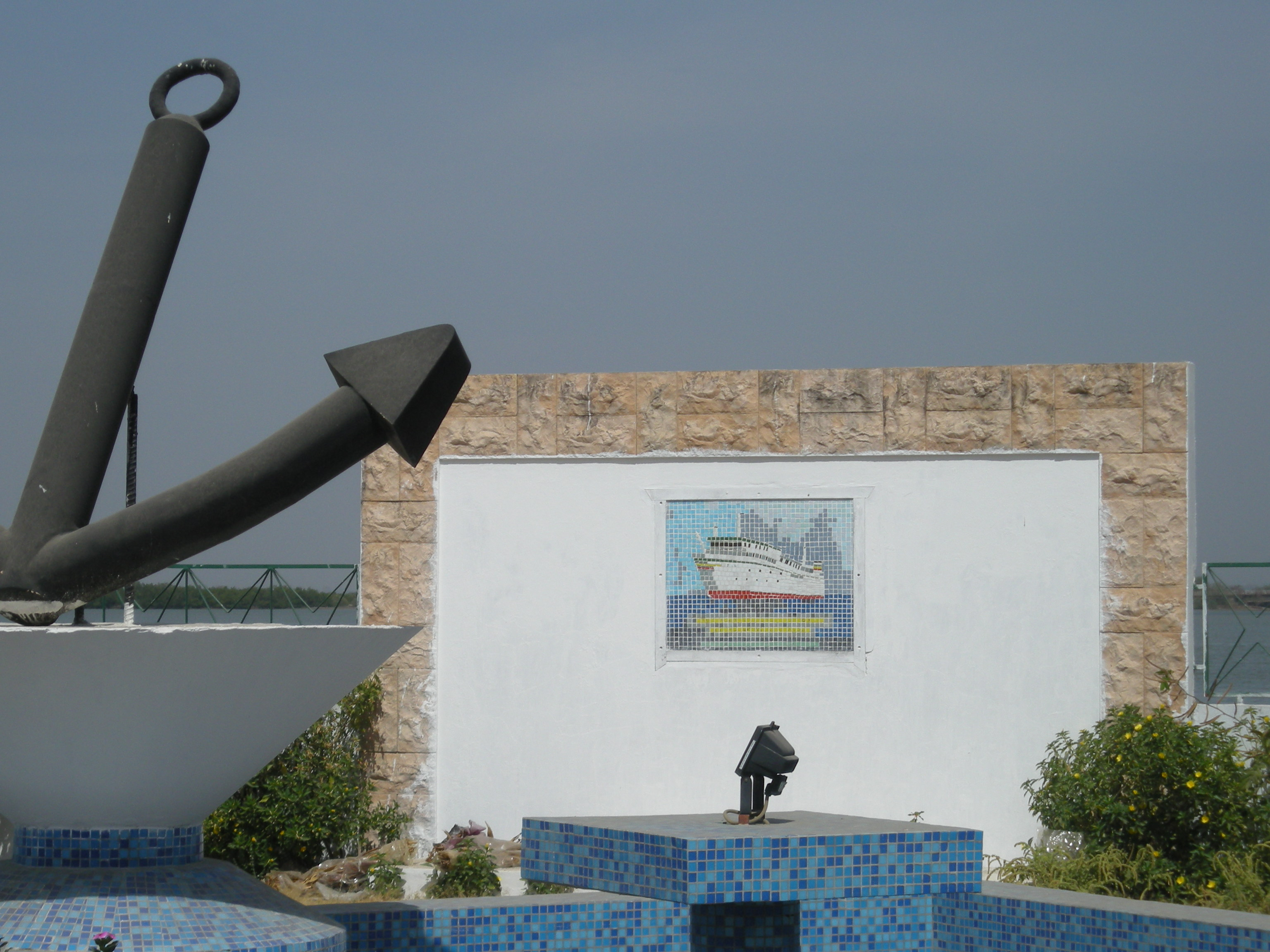
Le Joola memorial, Ziguinchor.

== Status of disaster ==
The sinking of Le Joola is the second-worst non-military maritime disaster in number of lives lost. The first is considered to be MV Doña Paz in 1987 with an estimated number of more than 4,000 people dead. RMS Titanic, which sank in 1912 with 1,523 dead, would be third according to the World Almanac and the New York Times.

== See also ==
- Maritime disasters
