= Charles Carrère =

French-Senegalese poet (1928–2020)

- Born: 9 December 1928; Saint-Louis, Senegal
- Died: 17 January 2020 (aged 91)
- Occupation: Poet

Charles Carrère (9 December 1928 – 17 January 2020) was a French-Senegalese poet who specialized in Francophone Africa.

== Biography ==
Carrère frequently wrote on the concept of Négritude, the movement of French African writers and poets to express their French identities. The movement was started by Léopold Sédar Senghor. He was Vice-President of the Maison Internationale de Poésie de Bruxelles when Arthur Haulot was serving as President. Carrère arranged the Festival international de poésie de Saint-Louis du Sénégal from 3 to 5 December 2015, with secondary school and university students competing in a poetry competition. The first place prize was called the "Prix Charles Carrère". He was an honorary member of the Maison Internationale des Poètes et des Ecrivains in Saint-Malo, France.

Charles Carrère died on 17 January 2020 at the age of 91.

== Works ==
- Océanes (1979)
- Lettres de Gorée (1982)
- Mémoires de la pluie (1983)
- Insula (1988)
- Noël pour Malaïka (1988)
- D’écume et de granit (1988)
- Nouvelle anthologie de la poésie nègre et malgache (1990)
- Mémoires d’un Balayeur suivi de Contes et Nouvelles (1996)
- Hivernage (1999)
