= Massata Samb =

Senegalese politician

Massata Samb is a Senegalese politician who is a member of the National Assembly.

== Attack ==
On 1 December 2022, Samb and fellow opposition lawmaker Mamadou Niang were involved in a fight with pregnant MP Amy Ndiaye in the chamber while it was in session. Samb and Niang were sentenced to six months in prison and ordered to pay Ndiaye five million CFA franc in compensation.
