= Mame Madior Boye =

Senegalese politician (born 1940)

- Maam Maajoor Bóoy

7th Prime Minister of Senegal
- In office 3 March 2001 – 4 November 2002
- President: Abdoulaye Wade
- Preceded by: Moustapha Niasse
- Succeeded by: Idrissa Seck

Personal details
- Born: 7 December 1940 (age 85) Saint-Louis, French West Africa (now Senegal)
- Party: Democratic Party
- Education: University of Dakar; French National School for the Judiciary

Mame Madior Boye (Wolof: Maam Maajoor Bóoy; born 7 December 1940) is a Senegalese politician who served as Prime Minister of Senegal from 2001 to 2002. She was the first woman to hold that position.

== Background and career ==
Boye was born to a family of lawyers in Saint-Louis, Senegal and like her three brothers, she was educated as a lawyer in Dakar and Paris. Her father was a clerk and a bailiff. She graduated from Faidherbe High School in her hometown. In 1963, she enrolled at the Faculty of Legal and Economic Sciences at the University of Dakar and then continued her training at the National Center for Judicial Studies (CNEJ) in Paris until 1969.

She spent most of her career in the Senegalese administration of justice. She was successively Deputy Public Prosecutor, judge and first vice President of the Regional First Class Court of Dakar and chamber President of the Court of Appeal. She was a founder and the first woman president of the Association of Senegalese Lawyers from 1975 to 1990, then became the Director of Engagements for the West African Banking Company (Compagnie bancaire de l'Afrique Occidentale, CBAO) from September 1990 to April 2000. Boye was also vice president of the International Federation of Women Lawyers from 1978 to 1998. She was a feminist, Muslim and divorced with two children. Her relations with the regime of President Abdou Diouf were strained and she did not accept high positions in the judicial system.

== Prime minister ==
Following the victory of Abdoulaye Wade in the 2000 presidential election, Boye became Minister of Justice in April 2000. But tensions arose between the President and the Prime Minister, who was from another political party. Moustapha Niasse resigned and Boye was appointed by Wade as Prime Minister on 3 March 2001, two months before the legislative elections. Wade lacked a majority in the legislature and more than 30 non-partisan women's organizations organized a campaign before the elections demanding more women in the legislature. Boye was not only a woman, she was also non-partisan, which looked good. She remained as Minister of Justice in the new government. The elections gave Wade a large majority - 89 of 120 seats. The representation of women increased, but not to more than 19 per cent. Following the April 2001 legislative elections, Boye was reappointed Prime Minister on 10 May 2001; she was, however, replaced as Minister of Justice in the government appointed on 12 May.

Boye's second government saw an increase in female representation, with five women among the 25 ministers, up from two previously. Despite this achievement, the government grappled with significant economic and social hurdles. Efforts were directed towards bolstering education and healthcare, enhancing salaries, curbing youth unemployment, and supporting the agricultural sector. The coalition faced internal disagreements due to the inexperience of its members. As Prime Minister, Boye was under the authority of President Abdoulaye Wade, known for his hands-on leadership style and authoritarian tendencies. On November 4, 2002, Boye and her government were dismissed by the President, purportedly due to her handling of the MV Joola sea disaster in September 2002, which claimed over 1,800 lives when the state-owned ferry sank, marking one of the deadliest shipping disasters in history. Initially, Boye attributed the accident to adverse weather conditions, absolving the ship and crew of blame. However, subsequent investigations revealed alleged high-level errors, leading to the dismissal of the navy chief and the resignation of two ministers.

== Afterwards ==
Later, in September 2004, Boye was appointed by Alpha Oumar Konaré as the African Union's Special Representative for the promotion of the protection of civilians in armed conflicts.

On 12 September 2008, a judge in France issued an arrest warrant for Boye, along with eight others, in connection with the Joola disaster. The Senegalese government rejected this and, in response, decided to prosecute the judge who issued the warrants. The Paris Court of Appeal annulled the arrest warrant for Boye in mid-June 2009.

Political offices
Preceded by Moustapha Niasse	Prime Minister of Senegal; 2001–2002	Succeeded by Idrissa Seck
