= COVID-19 pandemic in Senegal =

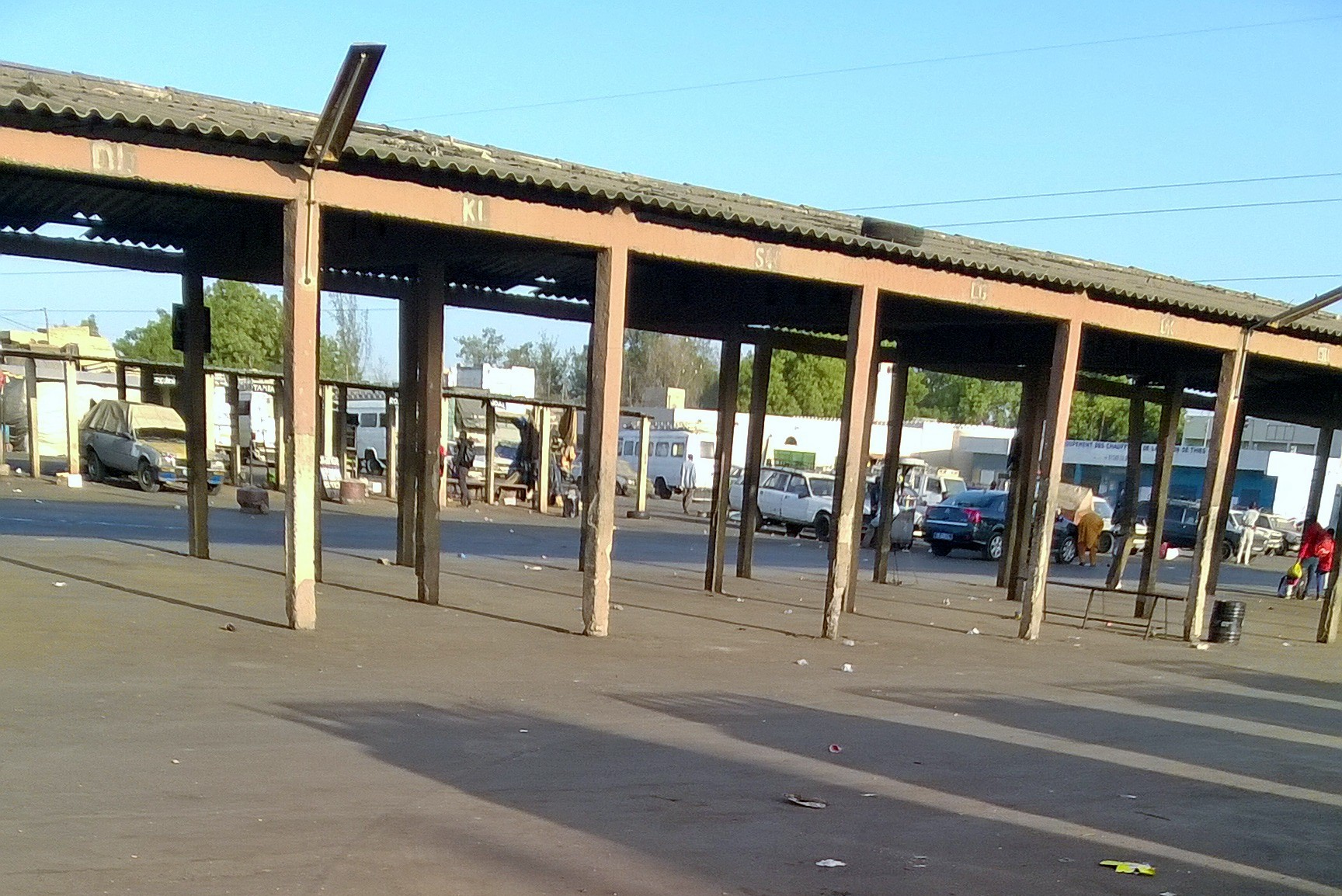
- Disease: COVID-19
- Pathogen: SARS CoV-2
- Location: Senegal
- First outbreak: Wuhan, Hubei, China
- Index case: Dakar
- Arrival date: 2 March 2020 (6 years, 7 months, 3 weeks and 5 days)
- Confirmed cases: 89,440 (updated 18 September 2026)
- Deaths: 1,972 (updated 18 September 2026)

The COVID-19 pandemic in Senegal was a part of the worldwide pandemic of coronavirus disease 2019 (COVID-19) caused by severe acute respiratory syndrome coronavirus 2 (SARS-CoV-2). The virus was confirmed to have reached Senegal on March 2, 2020.

== Background ==
On 12 January 2020, the World Health Organization (WHO) confirmed that a novel coronavirus was the cause of a respiratory illness in a cluster of people in Wuhan, Hubei, China, which was reported to the WHO on 31 December 2019.

The case fatality ratio for COVID-19 has been much lower than SARS of 2003, but the transmission has been significantly greater, with a significant total death toll. Model-based simulations for Senegal suggest that the 95% confidence interval for the time-varying reproduction number R_{t} exceeded 1.0 from November 2020 to January 2021.

== Timeline ==
=== March 2020 ===
- On 2 March 2020, a 54-year-old man from France was the first confirmed case of COVID-19 in Senegal, living in the Almadies Arrondissement of Dakar, having been tested positive at the Pasteur Institute in Dakar. He had travelled on Air Senegal on 29 February 2020. Senegal became the second Sub-Saharan country to report confirmed cases after Nigeria. The second confirmed case of COVID-19 was a French expat who came to Dakar from France. They are quoted as being in a "comfortable" condition.
- By 4 March, the number of cases rose to four, with both cases being foreign nationals. The first case was the wife of the first case in Senegal, who arrived in the country on 19 February. The other case was a Briton from London, who came to Senegal on 24 February.
- Basketball Africa League postponed the start of their inaugural season on 6 March 2020, which would have taken place in Dakar. This came as fear mounted over religious events and travel, especially those related to the Grand Magal, a Mouride festivity which occurs in Touba.
- On 10 March, Senegalese Health Minister Abdoulaye Diouf Sarr told local press that the government would call off religious events if advised to do so. On the same day, a Senegalese national returning from Italy confirmed positive, becoming the fifth case in the country.
- On 12 March, five more cases were announced in Senegal, which were family members of a confirmed case of the Senegalese national returning from Italy. One of the victims was in the holy city of Touba, despite many people being convinced by clerics that they were immune to the coronavirus.
- As of 15 March, there were 24 confirmed cases in Senegal. Senegal imposed travel restrictions, banned cruise ships, and closed schools for three weeks in response to the coronavirus. They also banned public gatherings for a month, including Muslim and Christian pilgrimages.
- On 23 March, Senegal declared a state of emergency.
- By the end of the month there had been 175 confirmed cases, 40 of whom recovered while 135 remained active cases at the end of the month.

=== April to June 2020 ===
- In April there were 758 new cases, raising the total number of confirmed cases to 933. The death toll was 9. The number of recovered patients increased to 334, leaving 590 active cases at the end of the month.
- Senegal experienced a 30% rise in COVID-19 infections on May 11 and eased restrictions on mosques and churches and relaxed the curfew on May 12. Senegal has reported 1,886 coronavirus cases and 19 deaths.
- During May there were 2712 new cases, bringing the total number of confirmed cases to 3645. The death toll rose to 42. The number of recovered patients increased to 1801, leaving 1802 active cases at the end of the month.
- There were 3148 new cases in June, bringing the total number of cases to 6793. The death toll rose to 112. The number of recovered patients increased to 4431, leaving 2250 active cases at the end of the month.

=== July to September 2020 ===
- In July there were 3439 new cases, raising the total number of confirmed cases to 10232. The death toll rose to 205. The number of recovered patients increased to 6776, leaving 3251 active cases at the end of the month.
- As cases continued to increase, reaching 11,003 (66% of those recovered) and 229 deaths on 8 August, Senegal's Minister of the Interior announced new restrictions including an emphasis on mandatory use of masks in closed spaces, a ban on gatherings at beaches, sports grounds, public spaces and theatres as well as prohibition of all demonstrations on the public highway, especially in the Dakar region.
- Judd Devermont, director of the Africa program at the Center for Strategic and International Studies praised Senegal's handling of the pandemic, second-best in the world (after New Zealand).
- There were 3,379 new cases in August, raising the total number of confirmed cases to 13,611. The death toll rose to 284. There were 3,888 active cases at the end of the month, representing an increase of 20% from the end of July.
- There were 1,108 new cases in September, bringing the total number of confirmed cases to 14,919. The death toll rose to 309. The number of recovered patients increased to 12,231, leaving 2,379 active cases at the end of the month.

=== October to December 2020 ===
- There were 697 new cases in October, bringing the total number of confirmed cases 15,616. The death toll rose to 324. The number of recovered patients increased to 14,853, leaving 439 active cases at the end of the month.
- There were 491 new cases in November, bringing the total number of confirmed cases to 16,107. The death toll rose to 333. The number of recovered patients increased to 15,627, leaving 147 active cases at the end of the month.
- There were 3,033 new cases in December, raising the total number of confirmed cases to 19,140. The death toll rose to 410. The number of recovered patients increased to 17,254, leaving 1,476 active cases at the end of the month.

=== January to March 2021 ===
- On January 9, 2021, Health Minister Ousseynou Badiane said Senegal does not have sufficient cold storage facilities for either the Pfizer–BioNTech or Moderna COVID-19 vaccine, and the country is awaiting vaccines through the World Health Organization-backed COVAX.
- The death toll reached 480 on January 12.
- Police used tear gas to break up a demonstration in Ngor, Dakar after President Macky Sall declared a 9 p.m.–5 a.m. curfew in Dakar and Thiès Region. Other demonstrations took place in Medina and Yoff areas and suburban Pikine, Guédiawaye, and Thiaroye.
- A first case of the B.1.1.7 variant was detected on 28 January.
- There were 7,787 new cases in January, raising the total number of confirmed cases to 26,927. The death toll rose to 638. The number of recovered patients increased to 22,145, leaving 4,144 active cases at the end of the month.
- Mass vaccination began on 26 February, initially with 200,000 doses of the Sinopharm BIBP vaccine. There were 7,593 new cases in February, raising the total number of confirmed cases to 34,520. The death toll rose to 872. The number of recovered patients increased to 28,894, leaving 4,754 active cases at the end of the month.
- There were 4,262 new cases in March, raising the total number of confirmed cases to 38,782. The death toll rose to 1054. The number of recovered patients increased to 37,434, leaving 294 active cases at the end of the month.

=== April to June 2021 ===
- There were 1,562 new cases in April, taking the total number of confirmed cases to 40,344. The death toll rose to 1107. The number of recovered patients increased to 39,083, leaving 154 active cases at the end of the month.
- There were 1,072 new cases in May, taking the total number of confirmed cases to 41,416. The death toll rose to 1139. The number of recovered patients increased to 40,070, leaving 207 active cases at the end of the month.
- There were 1,541 new cases in June, taking the total number of confirmed cases to 42,957. The death toll rose to 1166. The number of recovered patients increased to 41,354, leaving 437 active cases at the end of the month.

=== July to September 2021 ===
- There were 19,333 new cases in July, raising the total number of confirmed cases to 62,290. The death toll rose to 1353. The number of recovered patients increased to 47,136, leaving 13,800 active cases at the end of the month. The number of vaccinated persons stood at 806,510.
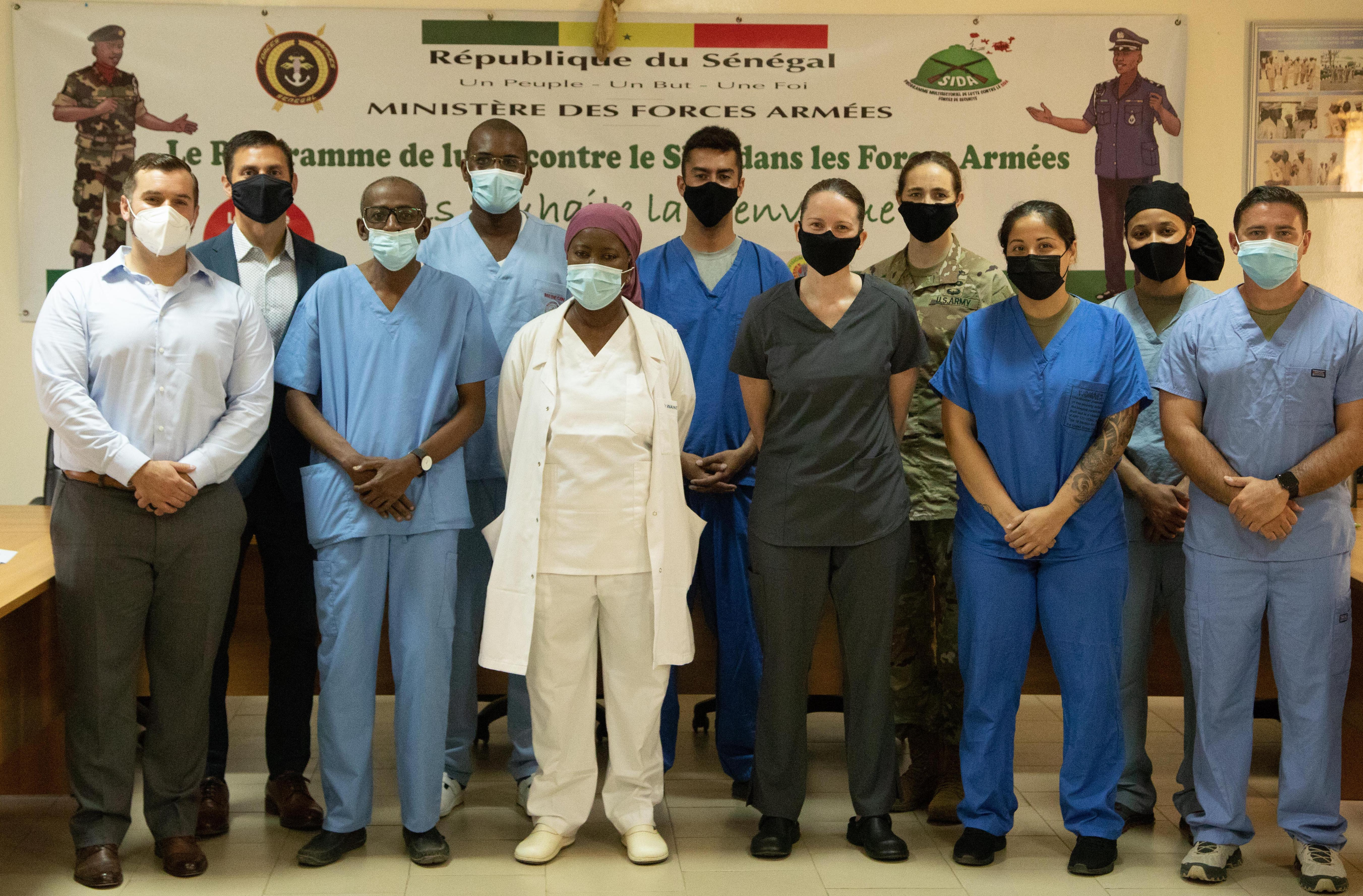
- Medical workers in Ouakam Military Hospital in Senegal, July 2021
  There were 10,515 new cases in August, raising the total number of confirmed cases to 72,805. The death toll rose to 1765. The number of recovered patients increased to 62,014, leaving 9,025 active cases at the end of the month. The number of vaccinated persons stood at 1,167,364.
- There were 970 new cases in September, bringing the total number of confirmed cases to 73,775. The death toll rose to 1858. The number of recovered patients increased to 71,792, leaving 124 active cases at the end of the month. The number of vaccinated persons stood at 1,251,403.

=== October to December 2021 ===
- There were 142 new cases in October, bringing the total number of confirmed cases to 73,917. The death toll rose to 1878. The number of recovered patients increased to 72,019, leaving 20 active cases at the end of the month. The number of vaccinated persons stood at 1,292,103.
- There were 73 new cases in November, bringing the total number of confirmed cases to 73,990. The death toll rose to 1885. The number of recovered patients increased to 72,093, leaving 11 active cases at the end of the month. The number of vaccinated persons stood at 1,327,768.
- On 5 December, the Institute for Health Research, Epidemiological Surveillance and Training (IRESSEF) announced the country had recorded its first case of the Omicron variant.
- There were 1347 new cases in December, bringing the total number of confirmed cases to 75,337. The death toll rose to 1890. The number of recovered patients increased to 72,645, leaving 801 active cases at the end of the month. The number of vaccinated persons stood at 1,365,479. Modelling by WHO's Regional Office for Africa suggests that due to under-reporting, the true cumulative number of infections by the end of 2021 was around 7.5 million while the true number of COVID-19 deaths was around 6,066.

=== January to March 2022 ===
- There were 9,662 new cases in January, bringing the total number of confirmed cases to 84,999. The death toll rose to 1946. The number of recovered patients increased to 80,308, leaving 2,744 active cases at the end of the month. The number of vaccinated persons stood at 1,394,280.
- There were 694 new cases in February, bringing the total number of confirmed cases to 85,693. The death toll rose to 1960. The number of recovered patients increased to 83,631, leaving 101 active cases at the end of the month. The number of vaccinated persons stood at 1,447,562.
- There were 208 new cases in March, bringing the total number of confirmed cases to 85,901. The death toll rose to 1965. The number of recovered patients increased to 83,903, leaving 32 active cases at the end of the month. The number of vaccinated persons stood at 1,462,588.

=== April to June 2022 ===
- There were 100 new cases in April, bringing the total number of confirmed cases to 86,001. The death toll rose to 1966. The number of recovered patients increased to 84,017, leaving 18 active cases at the end of the month. The number of vaccinated persons stood at 1,465,788.
- There were 107 new cases in May, bringing the total number of confirmed cases to 86,108. The death toll remained unchanged. The number of recovered patients increased to 84,120, leaving 22 active cases at the end of the month. The number of vaccinated persons stood at 1,883,218.
- There were 227 new cases in June, bringing the total number of confirmed cases to 86,335. The death toll rose to 1968. The number of recovered patients increased to 84,336, leaving 30 active cases at the end of the month.

=== July to September 2022 ===
- There were 1,051 new cases in July, bringing the total number of confirmed cases to 87,386. The death toll remained unchanged. The number of recovered patients increased to 85,129, leaving 289 active cases at the end of the month.
- There were 726 new cases in August, bringing the total number of confirmed cases to 88,112. The death toll remained unchanged. The number of recovered patients increased to 86,002, leaving 141 active cases at the end of the month.
- There were 307 new cases in September, bringing the total number of confirmed cases to 88,419. The death toll remained unchanged. The number of recovered patients increased to 86,339, leaving 111 active cases at the end of the month.

=== October to December 2022 ===
- Samples taken between May and October showed that the rapidly spreading BA.5.2.1.7 variant was present in Senegal.
- There were 386 new cases in October, bringing the total number of confirmed cases to 88,805. The death toll remained unchanged. The number of recovered patients increased to 86,747, leaving 89 active cases at the end of the month.
- There were 68 new cases in November, bringing the total number of confirmed cases to 88,873. The death toll remained unchanged.
- There were 27 new cases in December, bringing the total number of confirmed cases to 88,900. The death toll remained unchanged. The number of recovered patients increased to 86,915, leaving 16 active cases at the end of the month.

=== January to December 2023 ===
- There were 150 confirmed cases in 2023, raising the total number of cases to 89,050. The death toll rose to 1971.

== Statistics ==
=== Confirmed new cases per day ===
View source data.

=== Confirmed deaths per day ===
View source data.

== Health education ==
In Senegal, graffiti artists engage actively in the fight against the coronavirus, by creating murals relating to COVID-19 on city walls, to spread information and warn the population and also to support healthcare personnel confronting the disease.

== See also ==
- COVID-19 pandemic in Africa
- COVID-19 pandemic by country and territory
- 2020 in Senegal
- 2021 in Senegal
- COVID-19 vaccination in Senegal
- HIV/AIDS in Africa
- Western African Ebola virus epidemic
- 1918 Spanish flu pandemic
- 1957–1958 influenza pandemic

== Literature ==
- Leveau Mac Elhone, A., 2020. Le Graffiti pour sauver des vies : l'art s'engage contre le coronavirus au Sénégal, Paris : Éditions Dapper.
