= Moustapha Niasse =

Senegalese politician and diplomat

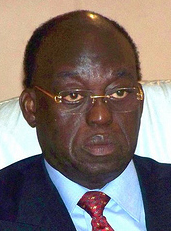
- Niasse in 2009

President of the National Assembly of Senegal
- In office 30 July 2012 – 12 September 2022
- Preceded by: Mamadou Seck
- Succeeded by: Amadou Mame Diop

Prime Minister of Senegal
- In office 5 April 2000 – 3 March 2001
- President: Abdoulaye Wade
- Preceded by: Mamadou Lamine Loum
- Succeeded by: Mame Madior Boye
- Acting; 3 April 1983 – 29 April 1983
- President: Abdou Diouf
- Preceded by: Habib Thiam
- Succeeded by: Habib Thiam (1991)

Foreign Minister of Senegal
- In office 1993–1998
- Prime Minister: Habib Thiam
- Preceded by: Djibo Ka
- Succeeded by: Jacques Baudin
- In office 1978–1984
- Prime Minister: Abdou Diouf; Habib Thiam
- Preceded by: Babacar Ba
- Succeeded by: Ibrahima Fall

Personal details
- Born: 4 November 1939 (age 86) Keur Madiabel, French West Africa (now Senegal)
- Party: AFP
- Education: University of Paris
- Occupation: Politician

Moustapha Niasse (born 4 November 1939) is a Senegalese politician and diplomat who served as the President of the National Assembly of Senegal from 2012 to 2022. He served in the government of Senegal as Foreign Minister from 1978 to 1984 and again from 1993 to 1998. He was Prime Minister of Senegal for a few weeks in 1983, and he held that position again from 2000 to 2001.

== Early life and education ==
Niasse was born in Keur Madiabel, Senegal. He graduated from Cheikh Anta Diop University and University of Paris.

== Political career ==
He was director of the Presidential Cabinet from 1970 to 1979. In March 1979, he became Minister of Town Planning, Housing and Environment, serving in that position until September 1979, when he became Minister of Foreign Affairs. He was promoted to the rank of Minister of State for Foreign Affairs in January 1981 and served in that position until April 1984. He briefly served as prime minister for a month in April 1983 prior to the abolition of that position. Niasse served as Minister of Foreign Affairs for the second time from June 1993 to July 1998. He then became Representative of the Secretary General of the United Nations in the Great Lakes countries until 1999.

During the late 1990s, he broke with President Abdou Diouf and formed his own party, the Alliance of the Forces of Progress (AFP). He was a candidate in the February 2000 presidential election, in which against President Diouf and long-time opposition leader Abdoulaye Wade also competed. Niasse received third place and 16.77% of the vote, while Diouf and Wade went to a runoff. Niasse supported Wade in the second round, and Wade promised him the position of prime minister; his support contributed to Wade's victory over Diouf. After Wade took office in early April 2000, he appointed Niasse as his prime minister.

Niasse served as prime minister until he resigned on 3 March 2001 due to the difficult relationship between himself and Wade. In the April 2001 parliamentary election, Niasse was elected to the National Assembly through national list proportional representation as an AFP candidate. In 2002, United Nations Secretary-General Kofi Annan appointed Niasse to be his envoy to the Democratic Republic of Congo in attempts to form a national unity government there. Brilliant negotiations by Niasse, coupled with pressure from South Africa and the African Union, led to the signing of the Global and Inclusive Agreement on Transition in the Democratic Republic of Congo (Pretoria Agreement), a key agreement in ending the Second Congo War.

Opposing an extension of the National Assembly's term beyond its five-year mandate, Niasse chose to resign his seat as a Deputy in June 2006, when the parliamentary term was originally scheduled to end.

In December 2006, Niasse was chosen as the candidate of Alternative 2007, a coalition of ten opposition parties, for the February 2007 presidential election. He was briefly detained by police in late January 2007, along with other opposition leaders, after participating in a banned protest regarding the delay of the next parliamentary election until June 2007. During the presidential campaign, Niasse blamed Wade for the Joola sea disaster; Wade in turn said that Niasse was a liar and that he was fortunate that he had not been jailed for crime he allegedly committed while serving as prime minister.

According to final results, Niasse placed fourth in the presidential election with 5.93% of the vote. He won one of the country's 34 departments, that of Nioro. Niasse rejected the results, alleged fraud, and said that the election was "a farce", but also said that he did not intend to file an appeal regarding the results.

Soon after the election, Wade mentioned Niasse as one of several opposition politicians who would be facing prosecution for corruption. Wade renewed an allegation, previously made in 2002, that Niasse had sold diplomatic passports to Taiwanese businessmen and others from that country.

In the March 2009 local elections, the opposition coalition Benno Siggil Senegaal—which included Niasse and the AFP—performed well in Nioro Department and across the country. Shortly afterward, Niasse said that Wade should react to his party's poor performance by dissolving the National Assembly and the Senate and resigning as president. According to Niasse, Wade "betrayed the people of Senegal" and put the country "in a catastrophic situation". He also derided Wade for having what he described as a "paranoid fixation" on Nioro Department.

In the February–March 2012 presidential election, Niasse stood again as a candidate and then backed Macky Sall against President Wade in the second round. Sall won the election. A few months later, Niasse was elected to the National Assembly in the July 2012 parliamentary election as a member of the coalition supporting President Sall. The presidential coalition won a large majority of seats. On 30 July 2012, he was elected as President of the National Assembly; he defeated opposition candidate Oumar Sarr, a loyalist of Wade. Niasse received 126 votes against 17 votes for Sarr; there were three blank votes.

On 11 October 2013, Niasse was re-elected as President of the National Assembly for another year.

== Honours ==
- Senegal:
  - Grand Cross of the National Order of the Lion (4 April 2022)
- Ivory Coast:
  - Grand Cross of the Order of Ivory Merit (6 June 2014)

Political offices
Preceded by Habib Thiam	Acting Prime Minister of Senegal; 3 April 1983 – 29 April 1983	Succeeded by Post abolished
Preceded by Mamadou Lamine Loum	Prime Minister of Senegal; 5 April 2000 – 3 March 2001	Succeeded by Mame Madior Boye
