= Mahammed Dionne =

Senegalese politician (1959–2024)

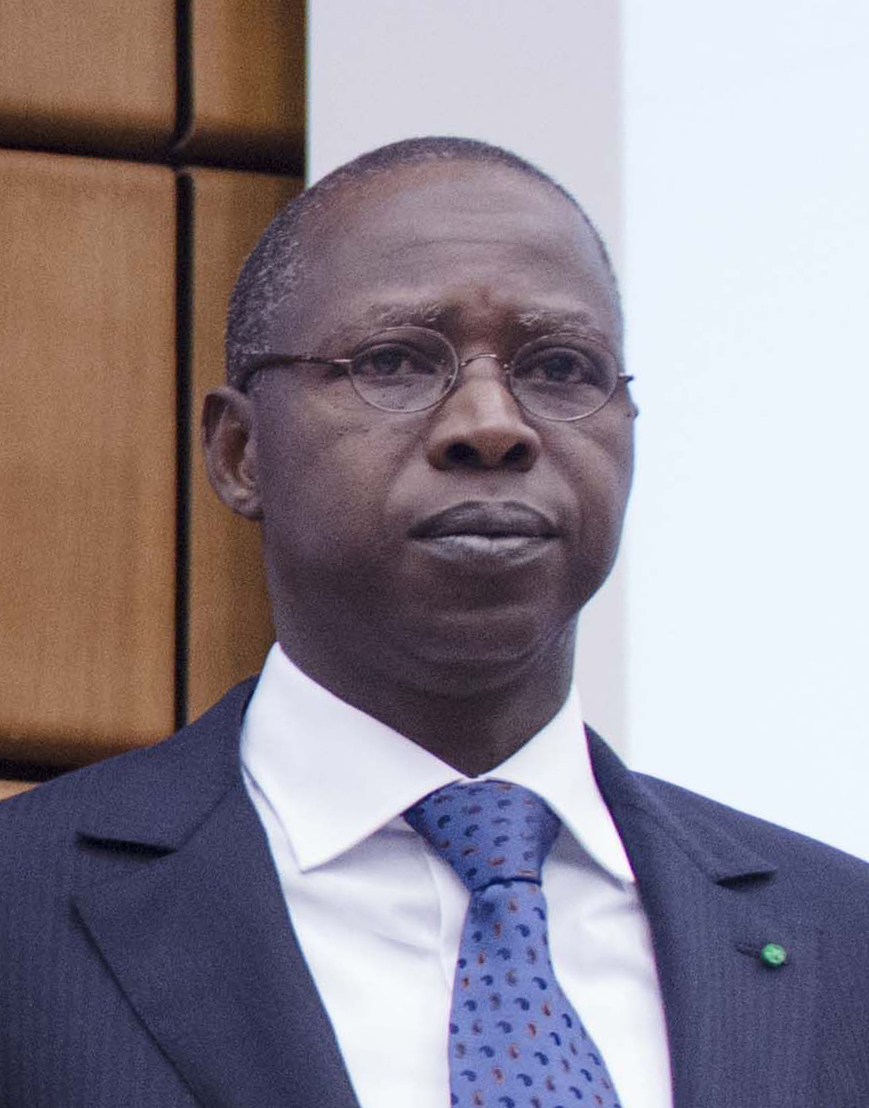

Prime Minister of Senegal
- In office 6 July 2014 – 14 May 2019
- President: Macky Sall
- Preceded by: Aminata Touré
- Succeeded by: Office abolished (2019–2022); Amadou Ba (2022)

Secretary General of the Presidency of Senegal
- In office 6 April 2019 – 28 October 2020
- President: Macky Sall
- Preceded by: Maxime Ndiaye
- Succeeded by: Oumar Samba Ba

Personal details
- Born: Mahammed Boun Abdallah Dionne; 22 September 1959 Gossas, French West Africa (now Senegal)
- Died: 5 April 2024 (aged 64) Paris, France
- Party: Independent
- Education: National Conservatory of Arts and Crafts; Pierre Mendès-France University

Mahammed Boun Abdallah Dionne (22 September 1959 – 5 April 2024) was a Senegalese politician who served as the Prime Minister of Senegal from 2014 to 2019. He was the third prime minister appointed by President Macky Sall. Dionne served at the Central Bank of West African States, the United Nations Industrial Development Organization (ONUDI), and as the advisor of the president, before his appointment as prime minister. He was a computer engineer by training.

== Early life ==
Dionne was born in Gossas on 22 September 1959. When his mother gave birth to him, she took refuge in a locality where her grandmother lived. His father worked as a police commissioner.

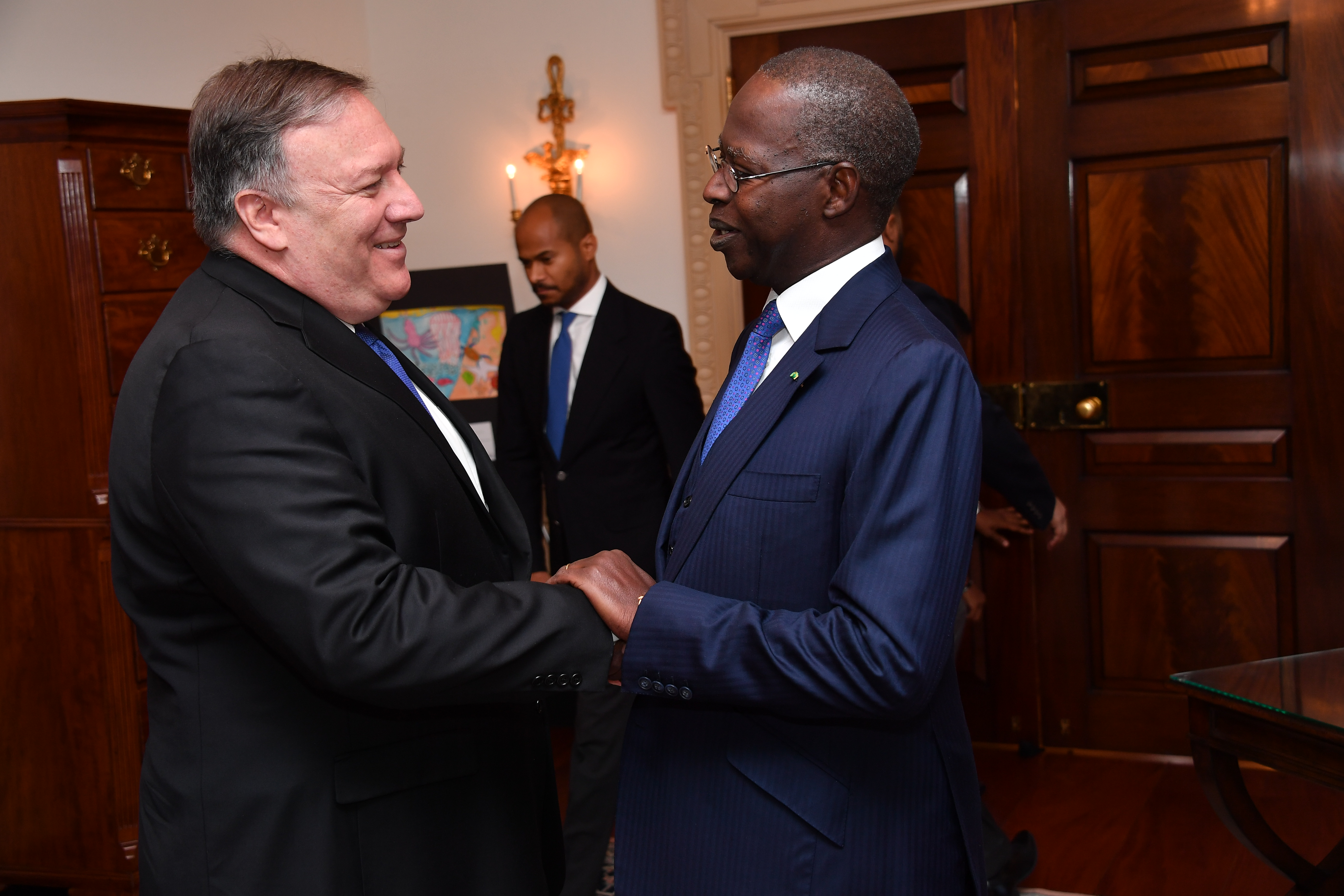
Dionne meets with U.S. Secretary of State Michael R. Pompeo at the U.S. Department of State in Washington, D.C., on 10 December 2018.

== Political career ==
Dionne worked as a computer engineer specializing in applied economics, and worked in a West African bank and as head of the Economic Office at the Senegalese Embassy in France. He was Director of the Cabinet of Prime Minister Macky Sall from 2005 to 2007, and when Sall moved to the post of President of the National Assembly in 2007–2008, Dionne continued working under Sall in the same capacity. In March 2014, he was appointed to coordinate the Plan Sénégal Emergent (PSE), an economic and social development plan to make the country an emerging economy by 2035. He became the Prime Minister in July 2014. During his tenure as prime minister, he continued to be involved in implementing the PSE.

Dionne headed the national candidate list of Benno Bokk Yaakaar, the coalition supporting President Sall, in the July 2017 parliamentary election. Following the victory of Benno Bokk Yaakaar, President Sall reappointed Dionne as prime minister on 6 September 2017. After the abolition of the office of prime minister in May 2019, he became Secretary General of the Presidency of Senegal, from 6 April 2019 to 28 October 2020.

== Death ==
Dionne died on 5 April 2024, in Paris, where he had been sent to for medical treatment after falling ill in the middle of his campaign during the 2024 Senegalese presidential election. He was 64.

Political offices
| Preceded by Aminata Touré | Prime Minister of Senegal; 2014–2019 | Vacant Title next held by Amadou Ba |
