= Prime Minister of Senegal =

Head of government

Prime Minister of the Republic of Senegal Premier ministre de la République du Sénégal
- Flag of Senegal

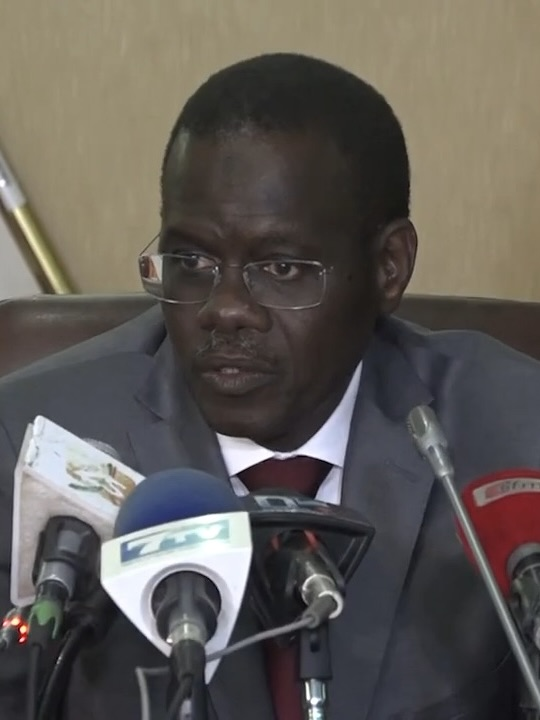
- Incumbent; Ahmadou Al Aminou Lo since 25 May 2026
- Member of: Cabinet of Senegal
- Residence: Primature
- Appointer: President of Senegal
- Term length: No term limit
- Inaugural holder: Mamadou Dia
- Formation: 18 May 1960
- Salary: CFA 4,300,000 monthly
- Website: primature.sn

The prime minister of Senegal (French: premier ministre du Sénégal) is the head of government of Senegal. The prime minister is appointed by the president of Senegal, who is directly elected for a five-year term. The prime minister, in turn, appoints the Cabinet of Senegal, after consultation with the president.

== History of the office ==
In 1963, due to deteriorating relations with Mamadou Dia, who was accused of leading an attempted coup, President Leopold Sedar Senghor removed the post of Prime Minister, after approving the decision through a referendum. This office was reinstated in 1970 following a new referendum and Abdou Diouf then held the post until he replaced Senghor as president in 1981. The office of prime minister was again abolished between 1983 and 1991. On 6 April 2019, after being reappointed by President Macky Sall, Prime Minister Mohammed Dionne announced that President Sall had tasked him with enacting various government reforms, including the elimination of the job of prime minister. Sall's goal was to remove the "intermediary level" of prime minister to allow the president to take a more hands-on approach to governing. In November 2021, Macky Sall announced the return of the post of prime minister suppressed since 2019.

== List of officeholders ==
Political parties

Socialist Party of Senegal (PSS)
Alliance of the Forces of Progress (AFP)
Senegalese Democratic Party (PDS)
Alliance for the Republic (APR)
African Patriots of Senegal for Work, Ethics and Fraternity (PASTEF)

Other factions

Independent

The following is a list of prime ministers of Senegal, since the country gained independence from France in 1960.

No.	Portrait	Name (Birth–Death)	Term of office			Political party	Elected	Cabinet(s)	President(s)	Ref.
No.	Portrait	Name (Birth–Death)	Took office	Left office	Time in office	Political party	Elected	Cabinet(s)	President(s)	Ref.
1		Mamadou Dia (1910–2009)	18 May 1960	18 December 1962	2 years, 214 days	PSS	1959	Dia I	Léopold Sédar Senghor	
1		Mamadou Dia (1910–2009)	18 May 1960	18 December 1962	2 years, 214 days	PSS	—	Dia I	Léopold Sédar Senghor	
Post abolished (18 December 1962 – 26 February 1970)
2		Abdou Diouf (born 1935)	26 February 1970	31 December 1980	10 years, 309 days	PSS	—	Diouf I	Léopold Sédar Senghor	
2		Abdou Diouf (born 1935)	26 February 1970	31 December 1980	10 years, 309 days	PSS	—	Diouf II	Léopold Sédar Senghor	
2		Abdou Diouf (born 1935)	26 February 1970	31 December 1980	10 years, 309 days	PSS	—	Diouf III	Léopold Sédar Senghor	
2		Abdou Diouf (born 1935)	26 February 1970	31 December 1980	10 years, 309 days	PSS	—	Diouf IV	Léopold Sédar Senghor	
2		Abdou Diouf (born 1935)	26 February 1970	31 December 1980	10 years, 309 days	PSS	—	Diouf V	Léopold Sédar Senghor	
2		Abdou Diouf (born 1935)	26 February 1970	31 December 1980	10 years, 309 days	PSS	—	Diouf VI	Léopold Sédar Senghor	
2		Abdou Diouf (born 1935)	26 February 1970	31 December 1980	10 years, 309 days	PSS	—	Diouf VII	Léopold Sédar Senghor	
2		Abdou Diouf (born 1935)	26 February 1970	31 December 1980	10 years, 309 days	PSS	—	Diouf VIII	Léopold Sédar Senghor	
2		Abdou Diouf (born 1935)	26 February 1970	31 December 1980	10 years, 309 days	PSS	—	Diouf IX	Léopold Sédar Senghor	
2		Abdou Diouf (born 1935)	26 February 1970	31 December 1980	10 years, 309 days	PSS	—	Diouf X	Léopold Sédar Senghor	
3		Habib Thiam (1933–2017)	1 January 1981	3 April 1983	2 years, 92 days	PSS	—	Thiam I	Abdou Diouf	
—		Moustapha Niasse (born 1939) acting	3 April 1983	29 April 1983	26 days	PSS	—	Niasse I	Abdou Diouf	
Post abolished (29 April 1983 – 8 April 1991)
(3)		Habib Thiam (1933–2017)	8 April 1991	3 July 1998	7 years, 86 days	PSS	—	Thiam II	Abdou Diouf	
(3)		Habib Thiam (1933–2017)	8 April 1991	3 July 1998	7 years, 86 days	PSS	—	Thiam III	Abdou Diouf	
4		Mamadou Lamine Loum (born 1952)	3 July 1998	5 April 2000	1 year, 277 days	PSS	—	Loum	Abdou Diouf; Abdoulaye Wade	
5		Moustapha Niasse (born 1939)	5 April 2000	3 March 2001	332 days	AFP	—	Niasse II	Abdoulaye Wade	
6		Mame Madior Boye (born 1940)	3 March 2001	4 November 2002	1 year, 246 days	PDS	—	Boye	Abdoulaye Wade	
7		Idrissa Seck (born 1959)	4 November 2002	21 July 2004	1 year, 260 days	PDS	—	Seck I	Abdoulaye Wade	
7		Idrissa Seck (born 1959)	4 November 2002	21 July 2004	1 year, 260 days	PDS	—	Seck II	Abdoulaye Wade	
8		Macky Sall (born 1961)	21 July 2004	19 June 2007	2 years, 333 days	PDS	—	Sall I	Abdoulaye Wade	
8		Macky Sall (born 1961)	21 July 2004	19 June 2007	2 years, 333 days	PDS	—	Seck II	Abdoulaye Wade	
9		Cheikh Hadjibou Soumaré (born 1951)	19 June 2007	30 April 2009	1 year, 315 days	Independent	—	Soumaré	Abdoulaye Wade	
10		Souleymane Ndéné Ndiaye (born 1958)	30 April 2009	5 April 2012	2 years, 341 days	PDS	—	Ndiaye	Abdoulaye Wade; Macky Sall	
11		Abdoul Mbaye (born 1953)	5 April 2012	1 September 2013	1 year, 149 days	Independent	—	Mbaye	Macky Sall	
12		Aminata Touré (born 1962)	1 September 2013	8 July 2014	310 days	APR	—	Touré	Macky Sall	
13		Mahammed Dionne (1959–2024)	8 July 2014	14 May 2019	4 years, 310 days	Independent	—	Dionne I	Macky Sall	
13		Mahammed Dionne (1959–2024)	8 July 2014	14 May 2019	4 years, 310 days	Independent	—	Dionne II	Macky Sall	
13		Mahammed Dionne (1959–2024)	8 July 2014	14 May 2019	4 years, 310 days	Independent	—	Dionne III	Macky Sall	
Post abolished (14 May 2019 – 17 September 2022)
14		Amadou Ba (born 1961)	17 September 2022	6 March 2024	1 year, 171 days	Independent	2022	Ba I	Macky Sall	
14		Amadou Ba (born 1961)	17 September 2022	6 March 2024	1 year, 171 days	Independent	—	Ba II	Macky Sall	
15		Sidiki Kaba (born 1950)	6 March 2024	3 April 2024	28 days	APR	—	Kaba	Macky Sall; Bassirou Diomaye Faye	
16		Ousmane Sonko (born 1974)	3 April 2024	22 May 2026	2 years, 49 days	PASTEF	—	Sonko I	Bassirou Diomaye Faye	
16		Ousmane Sonko (born 1974)	3 April 2024	22 May 2026	2 years, 49 days	PASTEF	2024	Sonko I	Bassirou Diomaye Faye	
16		Ousmane Sonko (born 1974)	3 April 2024	22 May 2026	2 years, 49 days	PASTEF	—	Sonko II	Bassirou Diomaye Faye	
Vacant (22 May 2026 – 25 May 2026)
17		Ahmadou Al Aminou Lo (born 1961)	25 May 2026	Incumbent	136 days	Independent	—	Lo	Bassirou Diomaye Faye	

== See also ==
- Politics of Senegal
- President of Senegal
- List of colonial governors of Senegal
