= Elections in Senegal =

Senegal elects on the national level a head of state – the president – and a legislature. The president is elected for a seven-year term by the people (between 2001 and 2008, it was a five-year term; this was changed back to the pre-2001 seven-year term in 2008, though incumbent president Macky Sall has stated he wants to have it reverted to five-year terms).

The National Assembly (Assemblée Nationale) has 150 members, elected for a five-year term, in multi-seat constituencies. Senegal has a multi-party system.

== Electoral law ==
=== Gender parity ===
In 2010, as a result of feminist campaigning, Law 2010-11 of 28 May 2010 established "absolute parity" in all institutions that are "partially or totally" electoral. Lists of candidates have to alternate candidates of "the two sexes".

In the 2012 parliamentary election, 64 of the 150 seats (43%) were won by women candidates and in the 2022 election, 73 of the 165 seats (44%) were won by women.

== Latest elections ==
=== Presidential elections ===
Candidate	Party	Votes	%
Bassirou Diomaye Faye	PASTEF	2,434,751	54.28
Amadou Ba	Alliance for the Republic	1,605,086	35.79
Aliou Mamadou Dia	Party for Unity and Rally	125,690	2.80
Khalifa Sall	Manko Taxawu Sénégal	69,760	1.56
Idrissa Seck	Rewmi	40,286	0.90
Thierno Alassane Sall	Republic of Values	25,946	0.58
Boubacar Camara	Party of Construction and Solidarity	23,359	0.52
Aly Ngouille Ndiaye	Independent	20,964	0.47
Papa Djibril Fall	The Servants / MPR	18,304	0.41
Serigne Mboup	Independent	16,049	0.36
Déthié Fall	Republican Party for Progress	15,836	0.35
Daouda Ndiaye	Independent	15,895	0.35
Anta Babacar Ngom	Alternative for the Next Generation of Citizens	15,457	0.34
Cheikh Tidiane Dieye	Independent	15,172	0.34
Mamadou Diao	Independent	14,591	0.33
Mamadou Lamine Diallo	National Patriotic Union/Tekki	9,998	0.22
Mahammed Dionne	Independent	8,435	0.19
Malick Gakou	Grand Party	6,343	0.14
Habib Sy	Independent	3,206	0.07
Total		4,485,128	100.00
Valid votes		4,485,128	99.24
Invalid/blank votes		34,125	0.76
Total votes		4,519,253	100.00
Registered voters/turnout		7,371,890	61.30
Source: Conseil constitutionnel

=== Parliamentary elections ===
Polls opened at 8:00 GMT and closed at 18:00 GMT on 31 July 2022. Partial results were expected to be announced on 31 July, with the provisional overall results to be announced on 5 August 2022. Women won 64 of the 165 seats, in line with the requirement of the 2010 gender parity law on Senegalese elections.

Party	Votes	%	Seats		
Party	Votes	%	National	Departmental	Total
United in Hope	1,518,137	46.56	25	57	82
Liberate the People	1,071,139	32.85	17	39	56
Wallu Sénégal	471,517	14.46	8	16	24
The Servants / MPR	56,303	1.73	1	0	1
AAR Sénégal	52,173	1.60	1	0	1
Bokk Gis Gis	44,862	1.38	1	0	1
Naataangue Askan Wi	25,833	0.79	0	0	0
Bunt Bi	20,922	0.64	0	0	0
Total	3,260,886	100.00	53	112	165
Valid votes	3,260,886	99.44			
Invalid/blank votes	18,224	0.56			
Total votes	3,279,110	100.00			
Registered voters/turnout	7,036,466	46.60			
Source: Constitutional Council

== See also ==
- List of political parties in Senegal
