= Babacar Diop (politician) =

Senegalese politician

Mayor of Thiès
- Incumbent
- Assumed office 23 January 2022
- Preceded by: Talla Sylla

Leader of the FDS/Les Guélawar
- Incumbent
- Assumed office 7 April 2018
- Preceded by: Party established

Personal details
- Born: 17 August 1982 (age 43) Thiès, Senegal
- Party: FDS/Les Guélawar
- Other political affiliations: Socialist Party of Senegal (2005–2017)
- Education: Lycee Malick SY

Babacar Diop (born 17 August 1982) is a Senegalese politician who has served as mayor of Thiès since 2022.

== Early life and education ==
Diop was born on 17 August 1982, to Cheikh Mbacké Diop, a teacher, and his wife, Fatou Bane. He was raised in the Sam Pathé neighbourhood of Thiès and later earned a certificate from the École Franco-Arabe Bilal de Thiès in French and Arabic. In 1997, he completed his BFEM at Djibril Thiaw College, where he was given the nickname Laye Diaw. Diop then attended the Lycee Malick SY where Diop stated he was one of the leaders of a strike demanding the establishment of a second high school in the city.

== Political career ==
He joined the Socialist Party of Senegal in 2005. He was the coordinator of the party's affiliated youth movement Youth for Democracy and Socialism (JDS). The JDS was briefly part of the Manko Taxawu Sénégal coalition during the 2017 Senegalese parliamentary election but withdrew on 24 August 2017. In a press statement, Diop stated that the coalition had "neither a project nor solid political structures".

On 7 April 2018, he created a new political party called the Democratic Forces of Senegal party (FDS/Les Guélawar). In the 2019 Senegalese presidential election, Diop supported Idrissa Seck, the former mayor of Thiès. On November 29, 2019, he and other activists were arrested for participating in a demonstration in front of the Palace of the Republic against the rise in electricity prices. Diop stated that he wrote two poems in prison honouring Mamadou Dia, whom he regards as his spiritual and political guide. Prior to the 2022 Senegalese local elections, the FDS/Les Guélawar joined the Liberate the People coalition, which selected Diop as their candidate for mayor of Thiès. He won the election on January 23, 2022, and became the 8th mayor of the city.
