= LGBTQ rights in Senegal =

- Senegal
- Legal status: Illegal since 1966 (Note: Senegalese officials claim that only public homosexual acts are prosecuted and that private homosexuality is legal.)
- Penalty: Up to 10 years imprisonment, and monetary fine; Max. penalty applies if committed with a person under 21
- Gender identity: No
- Military: No
- Discrimination protections: No

Family rights
- Recognition of relationships: Same-sex marriage constitutionally banned since 2026
- Adoption: No

Lesbian, gay, bisexual, transgender, and queer (LGBTQ) people in Senegal experience legal persecution. Senegal specifically outlaws same-sex sexual acts and, in the past, has prosecuted men accused of homosexuality. Members of the LGBTQ community face routine discrimination in Senegalese society. Negative attitudes towards homosexuality are widespread.

== Laws on same-sex sexual activity ==
Same-sex sexual activity is illegal in Senegal. Article 319 in the Senegalese Penal Code states: (Note: The official text of the third paragraph of Article 319 in French (Code Penal Sénégal, p. 52))

[...] sera puni d'un emprisonnement d'un à cinq ans et d'une amende de 100.000 à 1.500.000 francs, quiconque aura commis un acte impudique ou contre nature avec un individu de son sexe. Si l'acte a été commis avec un mineur de 21 ans, le maximum de la peine sera toujours prononcé.

[... whoever will have committed an improper or unnatural act with a person of the same sex will be punished by imprisonment of between one and five years and by a fine of 100,000 to 1,500,000 francs. If the act was committed with a person below the age of 21, the maximum penalty will always be applied.]

On 25 February 2026, Prime Minister of Senegal Ousmane Sonko presented a bill to lengthen prison sentences and increase fines for so-called "unnatural" acts. This bill, which was a campaign promise of the Prime Minister, was adopted on March 12. The new law includes a prison sentence of 5 to 10 years for "unnatural acts," fines of 100,000 to ten million CFA francs, compared to the 1.5 million of the previous law, as well as a ban on the "promotion, financing and support of homosexuality, bisexuality and transsexuality." It also includes a penalty for "abusive relationships conducted in bad faith".

According to the United Nations High Commissioner for Human Rights, Volker Türk, the new law violates human rights. On 30 March 2026, the law was signed by President Bassirou Diomaye Faye and published in the official gazette the following day. According to Le Monde, the press reported daily on the arrests of homosexuals in a context marked by a "wave of homophobia".

== Policies ==
=== Same-sex relationships ===
Same-sex couples have no legal recognition, whether in the form of marriage or civil unions. In June 2026, the National Assembly voted unanimously to amend the Constitution to ban same-sex marriage.

=== Adoption of children ===
According to information published in July 2011 by the United States Department of State, a couple married for a minimum of five years or an unmarried person who is at least 35 years of age is eligible to adopt a Senegalese child if there is at least 15 years between the age of the child and the age of the adopting parent. Senegalese law does not specifically make LGBTQ persons ineligible to adopt.

=== Discrimination protections ===
There are no laws that broadly protect LGBTQ people against discrimination. There are, however, limited legal protections that explicitly prohibit individuals or media organisations from revealing or implying the sexual orientation of any person, or depicting or discussing a person's sexual orientation in a manner that is discriminatory or stigmatising: (Note: Article 431-24 of the Penal Code, amended by Law on Cybercrime (2008), states: Anyone who, except in cases provided for by law, places or stores on a computer medium or memory, without the express consent of the person concerned, personal data that, directly or indirectly, reveals the person's racial or ethnic origin, political, philosophical, or religious opinions, or trade union membership, or that relates to the person's health or sexual orientation, shall be punished by imprisonment of one (1) to seven (7) years and a fine of 500,000 to 10,000,000 francs, or only one of these two penalties. The provisions of the first point of this article apply to non-automated processing of personal data whose implementation is not limited to the exercise of exclusively personal activities. Article 18 of Law 2017-27 on the Press Code states: Journalists and media technicians must respect human dignity and avoid any allusion, through text, images, and sound, to a person's ethnic or national affiliation, religion, gender, or sexual orientation, as well as to any physical or mental illness or disability that may be discriminatory and/or stigmatizing.)

== Political and community attitudes ==
According to the 2013 Pew Global Attitudes Project, 97% (Note: The number of adults (all were at least 18 years of age) surveyed in Senegal was 800, yielding a margin of error of 4.1 percent with a 95 percent confidence level.) of Senegal residents believe that homosexuality is a way of life that society should not accept, a figure unchanged from 2007.

In January 2009, Cary Alan Johnson at the International Gay and Lesbian Human Rights Commission described "pretty consistent human rights violations ... in Senegal". Contrasting this with Dakar's hosting of a major conference on AIDS and sexually transmitted infections, where, he said, "the needs of men who have sex with men were prominently featured", he went on to characterise Senegal as "schizophrenic" in its attitudes: "There's both a movement towards progressive and inclusive culture but at the same time very, very strong movements towards oppression, specifically towards sexuality".

In 2016 Macky Sall, the President of Senegal, stated he will never legalize gay sex. He said: "Never, under my authority, will homosexuality be legalized in the Senegalese lands."

In March 2026, MP Diaraye Bâ declared that "homosexuals will no longer breathe in this country." This statement was immediately supported by Prime Minister Ahmadou Al Aminou Lo, in response to international protests over the introduction of a new law with harsher penalties.

== Living conditions ==
=== Community in Dakar ===
In Senegal's capital, Dakar, in the 1990s there existed a community of biologically male Senegalese who referred to themselves as gordjiguene (also written as gor-digen or goor-jiggen), translated to mean "manwoman". This community openly coexisted with the rest of the city, who knew about it. Two types of gordjiguene existed: the oubis (“open") and the yauss ("fallen women" or "bad women"). The oubis were effeminate and used feminine pronouns. The yauss were men who penetrated during sexual intercourse, were married or had girlfriends, and presented as masculine.

=== Harassment and abuse ===
In mid-2009 Muslim activists created the Front islamique pour la defense des valeurs éthiques ('The Islamic Front for the Defense of Ethical Values'), advocated for homosexuals to face the death penalty. There were multiple reports around the same time of people digging up the bodies of deceased "goor-gigen" (a Senegalese term for "man-woman") in cemeteries. Local and international press reported in May 2009 that the corpse of a man reputed to have been homosexual was twice disinterred from a Muslim cemetery in Thies. The first time, the body was left near the grave. After his family reburied him, the body was disinterred a second time and dumped outside his family's home.

In December 2012, a gay male couple was viciously beaten near Dakar by one of the men's parents after the couple was caught having sex.

==== 2023 ====
On the 28th of October 2023, in Kaolack, a group of individuals exhumed the body of Cheikh Fall, a gay man, and subsequently set it on fire. Local law enforcement verified that, on the 30th of October 2023, four individuals believed to be "among the masterminds" were apprehended. Serigne Cheikh Tidiane Khalifa Niasse, leading a regional chapter of the influential Tidianes religious brotherhood, denounced the incidents in Kaolack. And Samm Jikko Yi, an advocacy group pushing for stricter penalties for gay sex, also expressed disapproval of the "mob justice". However, they attributed blame to the Senegalese state, asserting that its perceived over-protection of the LGBTQ community had triggered a backlash.

== Arrests and prosecutions: selected cases ==
=== 2008 ===
In 2008, Dakar's Icone magazine reported on and published photographs of an alleged gay marriage that had taken place in a private home in Senegal. The editor of the magazine, Mansour Dieng, claimed that he subsequently received death threats. Five men in the photographs were arrested but were later released without charge. It is not clear if the arrests stemmed from Senegal's anti-homosexuality laws or the death threats.

=== 2009 ===
On 19 December 2008, nine men were arrested on charges of homosexuality in a private flat in Dakar, allegedly after police received an anonymous tip. One of the arrestees was Diadji Diouf, the owner of the flat and a well-known Senegalese activist who heads AIDES Senegal, which provides HIV/AIDS prevention and treatment services to men who have sex with men. The men were repeatedly tortured while in police custody, even after they confessed to being gay.

On 6 January 2009, all these men were convicted of "indecent conduct and unnatural acts" (5 years' imprisonment) and for "being members of a criminal group" (3 years' imprisonment). The judge said that AIDES Senegal was a "cover to recruit or organize meetings for homosexuals, under the pretext of providing HIV/AIDS prevention programmes".

The Court of Appeals overturned the convictions in April 2009 and ordered the immediate release of the men. While incarcerated, the nine were held in special quarters because of threats from other inmates. Shortly thereafter, Imam and Member of Parliament Mbaye Niang organized a march to protest both homosexuality in general and the government intervention that allowed for the release of the men.

=== 2018 ===
In September 2018 two men and two women were arrested in the capital, Dakar, for homosexuality. The four were arrested after people in their neighbourhood circulated videos of them allegedly engaged in sexual activity. Local LGBTQ activists considered the arrests to be part of a pre-2019 Senegalese presidential election crackdown: a political ploy to ensure politicians do not seem to be 'pro-homosexual'. The arrests came shortly after the conviction in early September of a local chief, Cheikh Abdel Kalifa Karaboué, for drugging and raping a male co-worker. He was sentenced to four years in prison for rape and sexual acts "against nature".

=== 2026 ===
In February 2026, 22 gay men were arrested within two weeks by Senegalese police for "acts against nature", their arrests sometimes being staged on social media. Among them was the TikToker Saliou Mbaye, known as Zale, arrested on February 20 at the Senegalese-Gambian border as he attempted to leave the country.

In August, Senegal arrested 99 men on charges related to same-sex activity. While 28 were released, 71 men could face up to 20 years in prison after lawmakers doubled the maximum sentence for “unnatural acts.”

== International views and input ==
=== U.S. Department of State ===
The U.S. Department of State's 2011 Human Rights Report found that,

In the recent past[,] gays, lesbians, bisexual, and transgender (LGBT) persons often faced criminal prosecution and widespread discrimination, social intolerance, and acts of violence. The media failed to report acts of hatred or violence against LGBT persons. In November 2010[,] Human Rights Watch released a report entitled "Fear of Life: Violence against Gay Men and Men Perceived as Gay in Senegal". The report discussed cases of violence against gay men and the legal and cultural milieu that fostered such violence. While the cases cited in the report were from 2009 and earlier, non-governmental organization observers speculated that the drop in cases reported during the year was due to several factors. First, violence against gay men and lesbians might have caused many LGBT persons in the country to go underground. Second, increased international attention might have caused the government to curtail prosecutions and other official discrimination. A report by the Panos Institute West Africa released on 20 July found that local media contributed to negative societal attitudes toward LGBT persons. Finally, successful legal challenges to the law used to prosecute gays and lesbians for consensual sexual activity may have helped curtail its use by prosecutors.

The U.S. Department of State's 2012 Human Rights Report found that,

LGBT persons often faced arrest, widespread discrimination, social intolerance, and acts of violence [in 2012]. Senegalese ... [non-governmental organizations] worked actively on LGBT rights issues, but because of laws against homosexuality and social stigma, they maintained an exceedingly low profile. The media rarely reported acts of hatred or violence against LGBT persons. ... [L]ocal human rights groups reported that LGBT persons still faced frequent harassment by police, including arrest based only on second-hand reports and poor treatment in detention due to their sexual orientation. In January two women were arrested following the circulation of a cell phone video that showed them kissing. The incident was widely covered in local print and online media. The women were held in detention and released on bail several days later but were never formally charged with a crime. In October a court in Dakar sentenced Tasmir Jupiter Ndiaye to four years in prison and fined him 200,000 CFA francs ($400) for violating laws prohibiting "acts against nature" in addition to charges of illegal possession of arms and battery, after he purportedly refused to pay another man, Matar Diop, for sexual services. Diop was sentenced to three years in prison.

=== Obama 2013 visit ===
While visiting Senegal in June, United States President Barack Obama called for African countries to give gays equal rights under the law. Senegal President Macky Sall responded by saying that "We are still not ready to decriminalize homosexuality." He also insisted that the country is "very tolerant" and that, "This does not mean we are homophobic." He said that countries make decisions on complex issues in their own time, noting that Senegal has outlawed capital punishment while other countries have not. He also said that, "Gays are not persecuted, but for now they must accept the choices of other Senegalese." Obama had previously been urged by the human rights group Amnesty International to use his trip around Africa to speak out against threats to gays and lesbians, which it claimed had reached dangerous levels in Africa. Before this trip, the Obama administration had been characterized as taking a "cautious" approach to the promotion of gay rights in Africa, to avoid "igniting a backlash that could endanger local activists."

=== Universal Periodic Reviews ===
The United Nations Human Rights Committee (UNHRC) completed Universal Periodic Reviews (UPR) of the human rights situation in Senegal in 2009 and 2013.

==== 2009 UPR ====
In October 2009, a UPR by the UNHRC made the following recommendations to Senegal (the country that initiated the recommendation is listed in parentheses):

- Amend the Penal Code to decriminalizing [sic] homosexual activity (United Kingdom, Belgium, Canada) between consenting adults (United Kingdom) in line with the provisions of ICCPR, particularly articles 2 and 26 (Canada);
- remove the article of the Penal Code criminalizing sexual conduct, which is not in compliance with the Universal Declaration of Human Rights (the Netherlands);
- review national legislation which results in the discrimination, prosecution and punishment of people solely for their sexual orientation or gender identity (Slovenia);
- put an end to the legal prohibition of same-sex sexual acts or practices between consenting adults, release individuals arrested on the basis of this provision (Czech Republic);
- free all persons imprisoned on the grounds of their sexual orientation (Belgium);
- launch a national debate which may lead to the decriminalization of homosexuality (Ireland);
- adopt measures to promote tolerance towards homosexuality, which would also facilitate more effective educational programmes for HIV/AIDS prevention (Czech Republic)

The UNHRC summarized Senegal's responses as follows:

In response to the statements relating to prosecutions of persons because of their sexual orientation, the head of the delegation said that homosexuality is a purely private matter, with a long history in Senegal, and is not in itself a cause for prosecution. The prosecutions referred to occurred only when the homosexual relations took place in public and were of an obtrusive nature, therefore placing them in conflict with morality and religion. Concerning decriminalization, it is necessary to take account of the culture, and avoid exacerbating the rejection of homosexuals and endangering their lives.

With regard to homosexuality, the delegation recalled that it had already given the necessary details and stated that decriminalizing homosexuality in Senegal was a complex issue that would require time and careful consideration because of the specific social factors involved.

Madické Niang, the foreign minister of Senegal, said on behalf of the Senegalese delegation on 6 February 2009:

Senegal people are not prosecuted for their sexual orientation. Sexual orientation in Senegal is a purely private matter. It is a private matter, nothing more. For many years now, we have seen homosexuality in our country and that has never led to situations where homosexuals are harassed, persecuted, or prosecuted. What has happened is that there have been situations where shocking behavior which ran counter to our religious beliefs and morality which [unintelligible] punishes unnatural sexual relations. I would ask you to understand the social realities of our country. This is an issue which is very complex. It is a very complicated issue in Senegal.

Let me say once again in Senegal homosexuals lead freely ... we even had a federal republic to authorize a homosexual to have their name changed to a woman's name in order to emphasize their feminine side. No one was shocked when the president authorized the man to adopt the woman's name. But when homosexuality becomes blatantly public, it leads to embarrassing situations. You have to understand that we are a country with a particularly tolerant form of Islam. And that is why we must avoid, we must avoid the development of fundamentalism. We must ensure social cohesion. We must also take measures to protect the lives of homosexuals. That is why I ask you to bear in mind our society, our sociological realities. This is a perfectly complicated issue for us where there are some problems but we are aware of them.

... I would like to go back to a very important issue. We are all struggling for the independence of our judges, for the independence of our justice system. If the courts hand down a decision, you cannot say the government is responsible for that court decision. The ... independent justice system which hands down a decision. And that is what the courts did in the case of the trials of these homosexuals. And I must say ... for 25 years I was a lawyer at the bar. I know the Senegalese justice system from the inside. ... Over those years there have been three cases where homosexuals were brought before the courts.

The first case was an organized homosexual marriage with a lot of fuss, a lot of publicity. The police arrested them and the court case led to an acquittal. The second case of homosexuals related to a foreign national who was already rather elderly who married a young Senegalese boy. And I would like to warn you ... that if an elderly man marries a young boy, the young boy does it so that he can emigrate and go in live in France or some other country abroad, that is the interest of the young person in getting married. This led to a conviction and an appeal was made against the conviction and ... the foreigner was able to leave the country after they were acquitted on appeal. And the third case ... is the case of homosexuals who joined together again with a great deal of fuss, carried out activities which led to disturbances in the neighborhood. The neighbors complained and the police acted. This has already been tried in the first instance, and an appeal has been made against that judgment, and the justice system is now dealing with this case independently on appeal.

==== 2013 UPR ====
In October 2013, the UNHRC's UPR made the following recommendations to Senegal (the country that initiated the recommendation is listed in parentheses):)

- Amend legislation that results in discriminatory practices, prosecution, and punishment of persons for their sexual orientation or gender identity and adopt education and awareness campaigns to promote tolerance in society (Uruguay)
- Consider adopting necessary measures to achieve nondiscrimination, protection, and integration of the LGBTQ population (Argentina)
- Effectively implement the principle of non-discrimination, including on grounds of sexual orientation (Austria)
- Amend the Penal Code to decriminalise same sex sexual relations (Belgium, Germany, Ireland, the Netherlands, and Mexico)
- Adopt measures to guarantee that LGBTQ individuals do not face persecution of any kind (Brazil)
- Repeal the laws that criminalize sexual orientation and gender identity and take concrete measures to protect sexual minorities (Greece)
- Promote respect for human rights of all discriminated groups because of sexual orientation (Paraguay)
- Ensure equal treatment and non-discrimination against lesbian, gay, bisexual, and transgender persons (Thailand)
- Establish a de facto moratorium on Article 319, Penal Code, and ensure that it is not the basis for arbitrary police arrests (Germany)
- Combat the persecution of persons on the basis of their sexual orientation or gender identity (Ireland)
- Start a national dialogue on the acceptance of homosexuality (Netherlands)
- Amend the Penal Code to respect, protect, and enforce the right to non-discrimination regardless of sexual orientation (Switzerland)
- Criminalize violence committed against individuals based on their sexual orientation (Mexico)

Senegal refused to accept these recommendations, explaining that merely being homosexual is not a crime even though same sex sexual acts are.

Sidiki Kaba, the minister of justice of Senegal, said on behalf of the Senegalese delegation on 21 October 2013:

There is no criminalization of homosexuality in Senegal. Article 319 talks about acts contrary to nature. The fact of being homosexual in Senegal is not a crime, and there has been no prosecution or trial of persons who are homosexual under the Criminal Code.

=== International law and treaties ===
In March 2010, the United Nations Working Group on Arbitrary Detention found that Senegal's National Police had detained persons who were alleged to have committed "unnatural sexual acts". The group recommended that Senegal, "Pay particular attention to detentions on the grounds of offending decency or public morality, with a view to avoiding any possible discrimination against persons of a different sexual orientation".

== Summary table ==
Same-sex sexual activity legal	No (Penalty: Up to 10 years imprisonment with a fine)
Equal age of consent	No
Anti-discrimination laws in hate speech and violence	No
Anti-discrimination laws in employment	No
Anti-discrimination laws in the provision of goods and services	No
Same-sex marriage	No (Constitutional ban since 2026)
Recognition of same-sex couples	No (Constitutional ban since 2026)
Step-child adoption by same-sex couples	No
Joint adoption by same-sex couples	No
Conversion therapy made illegal	No
Gays and lesbians allowed to serve openly in the military	No
Right to change legal gender	No
Access to IVF for lesbians	No
Commercial surrogacy for gay male couples	No
MSMs allowed to donate blood	No

== See also ==
- Human rights in Africa
- LGBTQ rights in Africa
- Timeline of LGBTQ history in Senegal
- Rama Yade – Franco-Senegalese conservative LGBTQ rights activist
