= 2023–2024 Senegalese protests =

Anti-government protest

2023 Senegalese protests
- Date: 1 June 2023 – 2 April 2024
- Location: Senegal
- Caused by: Convinction of opposition leader Ousmane Sonko for corrupting young people, potentially disqualifying him from competing in the 2024 Senegalese presidential election
- Methods: Protests, demonstrations, civil unrest, violence
- Result: 2024 Senegalese presidential election held on 24 March 2024

Parties
Opposition: PASTEF (Until 31 July 2023)	Government of Senegal: Riot police; Senegal Army

Lead figures
Ousmane Sonko	Macky Sall; Antoine Diome

Casualties
- Deaths: 23+
- Arrested: About 500

The 2023–2024 Senegalese protests broke out in Senegal on 1 June 2023 following opposition leader Ousmane Sonko's conviction for corrupting young people, which may disqualify him from standing in the 2024 Senegalese presidential election. At least 23 persons died during the protests and about 500 were arrested.

== Background ==
Ousmane Sonko, an opposition leader in Senegal, rose to prominence when he came in third place during the 2019 Senegalese presidential election. He is popular among the nation's youth and is considered the main opponent of Macky Sall, the incumbent president. Sonko was tried in absentia on charges of corrupting young people, rape and making death threats. He was convicted of corrupting young people, but cleared of rape and making death threats. He was given a two-year prison term, although there was no warrant out for his arrest at the time of the demonstrations. Sonko and his supporters have said that he is innocent and that Sall is trying to frame him in order to thwart Sonko's bid for the presidency in 2024. The government has denied that claim. It has said that Sonko could ask for a retrial once he is imprisoned.

In 2021, further protests broke out and the country was described as "on the verge of an apocalypse".

There were also concerns that Sall would try to bypass Senegal's limit of two presidential terms and run again in the 2024 Senegalese presidential election. Sonko urged Sall to state publicly that he would not run in 2024. Until 3 July 2023, Sall had neither confirmed nor denied that he would try to run in the 2024 election. On 3 July, Sall said that he would not run in 2024.

== Protests ==
After Sonko's conviction, protests started in several cities on 1 June 2023. On 2 June, Sonko's PASTEF-Patriots Party urged the populace to resist until President Sall resigned. The protests in Dakar's Ouakam and Ngor districts became violent, which overwhelmed the local police, and looting occurred. As a response to the violence, the Senegalese Army was deployed. The government and the opposition blame each other for the violence. There have been arbitrary arrests due to the demonstrations. According to Interior Minister Antoine Diome, about 500 people had been arrested by 4 June. Nine people had died by 2 June and there was extensive destruction at Cheikh Anta Diop University, which was the site of prolonged clashes where protesters set buses on fire and police fired tear gas. By 3 June, 15 people had died, including two security officers. That surpassed the death toll during the 2021 Senegalese protests, which were the first protests related to Sonko's trial. There was less violence on 4 June, but there were clashes during the day that continued into the evening. Protesters in residential neighborhoods threw rocks at police, barricaded roads and burned tires, while police fired tear gas at the protesters. On 5 June, Senegal's public broadcaster RTS said that at least 16 people had died. Two members of the security forces were among the dead. On 8 June 2023, Amnesty International announced that it had counted at least 23 deaths in the unrest. Several people were killed by gunshot wounds.

Beginning on 2 June, the government of Senegal has restricted access to social media websites such as Facebook, WhatsApp, and Twitter.

In February 2024, President Sall announced that the presidential election scheduled for 25 February would be postponed until December, citing alleged irregularities in the candidate list. This led to clashes between protestors and police. The delay was later declared unlawful by the Constitutional Court. Following the ruling, the government announced that the election would be held on 24 March. Sall simultaneously dissolved the government and replaced Prime Minister Amadou Ba, the ruling coalition’s presidential candidate, with Interior Minister Sidiki Kaba to allow Ba to focus on his campaign.

== Reactions ==
United Nations Secretary-General António Guterres condemned the violence and "urged all those involved to ... exercise restraint". Moussa Faki Mahamat, the Chairperson of the African Union Commission, strongly condemned the violence and urged leaders to avoid acts that "tarnish the face of Senegalese democracy, of which Africa has always been proud." The Economic Community of West African States said that all parties should "defend the country's laudable reputation as a bastion of peace and stability." The European Union and France expressed concern over the violence. The United States State Department said, "Senegal's strong record of democratic governance, rule of law, and peaceful coexistence is something for which the Senegalese people can be rightfully proud. We urge all parties to voice their views in a peaceful manner."

On 8 June 2023, the Senegalese Football Federation suspended all association football games in Senegal.

== Aftermath ==
In March 2024, the National Assembly passed an amnesty law covering offences linked to protests between 2021 and 2024, halting prosecutions for the deaths of at least 65 people. Rights groups condemned it as denying victims’ families justice.

Under that law, detained political figures Ousmane Sonko and Bassirou Diomaye Faye were released. The government of Macky Sall justified the amnesty in the name of national reconciliation and calming political tensions ahead of the 2024 election. Despite the amnesty, civil society, victims’ associations, and international NGOs maintained pressure for accountability and redress. Amnesty International argued the law constituted an “obstacle that must be removed” for Senegal to fulfill its obligations to ensure justice, truth, and reparations. In January 2025, the government extended financial assistance to families of those killed during protests and to detainees, though this was offered outside a judicial or accountability framework.

On 3 April 2025, parliament revised the law to exclude serious crimes such as murder, torture, and enforced disappearance.

On 24 April 2025, Senegal’s Constitutional Council struck down key parts of the amendment, ruling that the proposed exclusion of certain crimes was unconstitutional, and affirming that crimes like murder and torture cannot be subject to amnesty in any case. The court’s ruling also clarified that individuals may file complaints for serious crimes despite earlier amnesty legislation.
