= Senegalese protests =

Senegalese protests may refer to:

- 2007–2008 Senegalese protests
- 2021 Senegalese protests
- 2023 Senegalese protests
