= Senegal hidden debt scandal =

Scandal regarding hidden national debt

The Senegal hidden debt scandal is a political scandal in Senegal ongoing since 2024 over hidden national debt.

== History ==
In the 2024 Senegalese presidential election, Bassirou Diomaye Faye of the left-wing PASTEF was elected President of Sengal on an ambitious platform of reforms, after the party's leader Ousmane Sonko was controversially disqualified. Sonko was subsequently appointed Prime Minister of the new government. As part of their platform, the PASTEF government carried out an audit of government finances under the previous administration of Macky Sall. The results of the audit were announced in September, finding that the government's budget deficit was potentially at least twice as high as the previous government had reported, with potentially billions of dollars worth of public debt having been accrued without being reported.

In March 2025, an IMF delegation headed by Edward Gemayel visited Senegal to investigate. The delegation's findings corroborated the government's audits, with Gemayel telling the press that "there was a very deliberate decision to underreport the debt during the preceding years."

In November 2025, Sonko announced that the government would not seek to restructure its debt, saying that it would prefer to tackle the hidden debt via other means, including raising taxes.

In September 2026, IMF reaches a staff-level agreement with Senegal on a new US$2.2 billion, 36-month loan program supporting economic reforms after an earlier arrangement was suspended over previously unreported government debt.

== See also ==
- Tuna bonds
