= List of presidents of the National Assembly of Senegal =

List of presidents of the National Assembly of Senegal (French: Présidents de l'Assemblée nationale du Sénégal).

Below is a list of office-holders:

No.	Portrait	Name	Term of office		Party
1		Lamine Guèye	1960	10 June 1968	Socialist Party of Senegal
2		Amadou Cissé Dia	1968	1983	Socialist Party of Senegal
3		Habib Thiam	1983	1984	Socialist Party of Senegal
4		Daouda Sow	12 April 1984	9 December 1988	Socialist Party of Senegal
5		Abdoul Aziz Ndaw	1988	1993	Socialist Party of Senegal
6		Cheikh Abdoul Khadre Cissokho	1993	2001	Socialist Party of Senegal
7		Youssou Diagne	2001	12 June 2002	Senegalese Democratic Party
8		Pape Diop	June 2002	June 2007	Senegalese Democratic Party
9		Macky Sall	20 June 2007	9 November 2008	Senegalese Democratic Party
10		Mamadou Seck	16 November 2008	30 July 2012	Senegalese Democratic Party
11		Moustapha Niasse	30 July 2012	12 September 2022	Alliance of the Forces of Progress
12		Amadou Mame Diop	12 September 2022	12 September 2024	Alliance for the Republic
13		Malick Ndiaye	2 December 2024	24 May 2026	PASTEF
14		Ousmane Sonko	26 May 2026	Incumbent	PASTEF

== See also ==
- National Assembly (Senegal)
