= Malick Ndiaye =

Senegalese politician (born 1982)

President of the National Assembly
- In office 2 December 2024 – 25 May 2026
- Preceded by: Amadou Mame Diop
- Succeeded by: Ousmane Sonko

Minister of Infrastructure and Land and Air Transport
- In office 5 April 2024 – 3 December 2024
- President: Bassirou Diomaye Faye
- Minister: Ousmane Sonko
- Preceded by: Mansour Faye
- Succeeded by: Yankhoba Diémé

Personal details
- Born: 24 July 1982 (age 43) Dahra, Senegal
- Party: PASTEF

Malick Ndiaye, also El Malick Ndiaye or N'diaye, (born 24 July 1982) is a Senegalese politician. A member of PASTEF since 2015, he served as Minister of Infrastructure and Land and Air Transport from April to December 2024, before being elected President of the National Assembly on 2 December 2024.

== Political career ==
Malick Ndiaye joined the PASTEF party in 2015.

On 5 April 2024, he was appointed Minister of Infrastructure and Land and Air Transport in the government of Ousmane Sonko, formed following the 2024 presidential election. He was the lead candidate for PASTEF in the Linguère department during the 2024 snap legislative elections. After his party's sweeping victory, he was elected President of the National Assembly on 2 December 2024, during the inauguration of the 15th legislature, receiving 134 votes in favor, 22 against, and 7 abstentions.
