= Daouda Sow =

Daouda Sow is a name. People with that name include:

- Daouda Sow (1933–2009), Senegalese politician and legislator
- Daouda Sow (born 1983), French boxer
