= Daouda Ngom =

Senegalese politician

Minister of Higher Education, Research, and Innovation
- Incumbent
- Assumed office 6 September 2025
- Prime Minister: Ousmane Sonko

Personal details
- Education: Cheikh Anta Diop University
- Occupation: Politician; Professor
- Profession: Politician

Daouda Ngom is a Senegalese academic and politician. He is the current Minister of Higher Education, Research, and Innovation of Senegal since September 2025. He also served as the Senegal's Minister of Environment and Ecological Transition from April 2024 to September 2025 under the first government formed by Ousmane Sonko.
