= List of ambassadors of Senegal to China =

Coordinates: 39.941676°N 116.446409°E

Ambassador of Senegal to China
- Incumbent; Papa Khalilou Fall since June 28, 2006
- Inaugural holder: Aly Dioum
- Formation: July 1973

The Senegalese Ambassador in Beijing is the official representative of the Government of in Dakar to the Government of the People's Republic of China.

== List of representatives ==
diplomatic agreement/designated/Diplomatic accreditation	ambassador	Observations	President of Senegal	List of premiers of China	Term end
1960		The governments in Taipei and Dakar established diplomatic relations. Senegal first established diplomatic ties with Taiwan in 1960, but these were severed in 1964.	Léopold Sédar Senghor	Chen Cheng	1964
1964		The governments in Beijing and Dakar established diplomatic relations.	Léopold Sédar Senghor	Zhou Enlai	
November 5, 1966		The governments in Taipei and Dakar established diplomatic relations.	Léopold Sédar Senghor	Yen Chia-kan	
December 7, 1971		The governments in Beijing and Dakar established diplomatic relations.	Léopold Sédar Senghor	Zhou Enlai	
July 1973	Aly Dioum		Léopold Sédar Senghor	Zhou Enlai	July 1978
July 1978	Antoine Pascal Sane	ambassadeur du Sénégal en Chine	Léopold Sédar Senghor	Hua Guofeng	February 1981
1984	Mamadou Seyni Mbengue		Abdou Diouf	Zhao Ziyang	
March 20, 1985	Ahmed Tijane Kane		Abdou Diouf	Zhao Ziyang	1987
September 8, 1988	Mady Ndao		Abdou Diouf	Li Peng	1994
January 1996		The governments in Taipei and Dakar established diplomatic relations.	Abdou Diouf	Lien Chan	
1999	Ahmed Tijane Kane		Abdou Diouf	Vincent Siew	2001
October 29, 2002	Youssou Diagne		Abdoulaye Wade	Yu Shyi-kun	
January 2006		The governments in Beijing and Dakar established diplomatic relations.	Abdoulaye Wade	Wen Jiabao	
June 28, 2006	Papa Khalilou Fall	On 28 June, Papa Khalilou Fall, the new Senegal ambassador to China, presented his letter of credence	Abdoulaye Wade	Wen Jiabao	
