= Saye Cissé =

Senegalese politician (born 1989)

National Assembly (Senegal) 2 December 2024
- Incumbent
- Assumed office 2 December 2024
- President: Bassirou Diomaye Faye
- Prime Minister: Ousmane Sonko

Personal details
- Party: PASTEF
- Profession: Teacher

Saye Cissé born in Bakel on 4 June 1989 is a Senegalese female politician and teacher. She is a member of the PASTEF party and in the department of Linguère.

== Biography ==
=== Politics ===
She started her political career in 2015, back when she was campaigning in the department of Tivaouane. She then returned to Linguère where she put herself as the local leader. In 2018, she took over the head of the departmental MOJIP (Jigeeni PASTEF Movement) of Linguère.

In 2022, she was a candidate on the national Yewi Askanwi list in the legislative elections. In 2024, she was appointed departmental coordinator for the Diomay coalition, being elected deputy.

She is member of the following committees:

- Regional Planning, Urban Planning, Housing, Infrastructure and Transport
- Sustainable Development and Ecological Transition
- Defence and Security

=== Education ===
Since 2002, she has been a professor of History and Geography at Lycée Alboury Ndiaye in Linguère and has taught in many other schools like Serigne Amadou Cissé high school in Pire and Malicounda II high school in Mbour. She holds aCAECAM (Certificate of Fitness for Education in Middle Schools).
