= Abdoul Aziz Ndaw =

Senegalese politician and diplomat

President of the National Assembly of Senegal
- In office 1988–1993
- Preceded by: Daouda Sow
- Succeeded by: Cheikh Abdoul Khadre Cissokho

Personal details
- Party: Socialist

Abdoul Aziz Ndaw (31 May 1922 – 12 February 2011) was a Senegalese politician. He served as President of the National Assembly of Senegal from 1988 to 1993.
