= Timeline of LGBTQ history in Senegal =

This is a timeline of notable events in the history of the lesbian, gay, bisexual, transgender and queer (LGBTQ) community in Senegal.

== Timeline ==
- Anthropological reports indicate that, prior to the French colonization of Senegal, certain LGBTQ men identified by the term góor-jigéen were accepted and had defined social roles. During the first half of the 20th century, Dakar was considered the "gay capital" of West Africa.

=== 1966 ===
- The Senegalese Penal Code is approved, criminalizing homosexuality for the first time. Article 319 defined a penalty of one to five years in prison for persons who committed "improper or unnatural acts" and its text was copied from the analogous French law of 1942.

=== 2001 ===
- Interior Minister Mamadou Niang warns that he would not allow a planned LGBTQ demonstration in Dakar to take place.

=== 2003 ===
- Activist Djamil Bangoura founded the LGBTQ organization Association Prudence. It was officially recognized in 2005, focusing its efforts on HIV prevention, thus becoming the first LGBTQ organization to receive official recognition in the country's history.

=== 2008 ===
- February: Ten people are arrested after Icône magazine publishes photographs showing the detainees at a symbolic same-sex marriage ceremony that allegedly took place in 2006. The event sparked widespread moral panic against homosexuality.
- December: Nine men working on HIV prevention campaigns are arrested for committing "unnatural acts" and for "forming a criminal association." They are sentenced to eight years in prison, the harshest sentence for homosexuality known at the time, although it is overturned in April 2009 by an appeals court. However, their release sparks a wave of hatred from the press and religious groups, who call for the stoning of any homosexual person.

=== 2009 ===
- May 2: A mob in Dakar exhumed the body of a man, allegedly gay, who had appeared in the previous year's Icône article, and threw it at the doorstep of his family's house, declaring they would not allow him to be buried in a cemetery.

=== 2010 ===
- September: The non-governmental organization Amnesty International publishes a report entitled "Senegal: Land of Impunity" which reveals that local police regularly tortured people arrested on charges of homosexuality.

=== 2012 ===
- March 5: The LGBTQ association AIDES-Sénégal obtains legal status and in the following years becomes one of the largest in the country.
- October: Senegalese journalist Tamsir Jupiter Ndiaye is sentenced to four years in prison for having a sexual intercourse with another man. Ndiaye receives a presidential pardon the following year, but is arrested again for the same offense in 2015 and sentenced to 6 months in prison.

=== 2013 ===
- June 27: During a press conference between US President Barack Obama and Senegalese President Macky Sall, Obama publicly called on states to respect the rights of LGBTQ people. President Sall stated that Senegal did not discriminate LGBTQ people, but that they were not ready to change the law that criminalized homosexuality.
- October: The Universal Periodic Review recommends that Senegal decriminalize homosexuality, but the government refuses.
- November: Five women are arrested during a birthday party in Dakar for allegedly being lesbians.

=== 2014 ===
- May 11: An LGBTQ-themed art exhibition opens as part of the Dakar Bienniale. However, the exhibition attracted controversy after being vandalized and accused of "promoting homosexuality," forcing it to close for three days.

=== 2015 ===
- July 21: Seven men, allegedly homosexual, are arrested in Dakar and sentenced to six months in prison each.
- December: Police in Kaolack arrest 11 people allegedly homosexual who were participating in a symbolic same-sex marriage.

=== 2016 ===
- January: A public controversy erupted after singer Waly Seck was photographed carrying a handbag considered "feminine," leading to accusations of "promoting homosexuality." The incident sparked a youth protest against LGBTQ people and prompted statements from President Macky Sall, who criticized a newspaper for publishing a satirical cartoon about the controversy.
- March: A mob of students from the University of Dakar set fire to university buildings and committed other acts of vandalism, leaving eight people injured, after university authorities prevented the mob from murdering a student accused of being gay.

=== 2018 ===
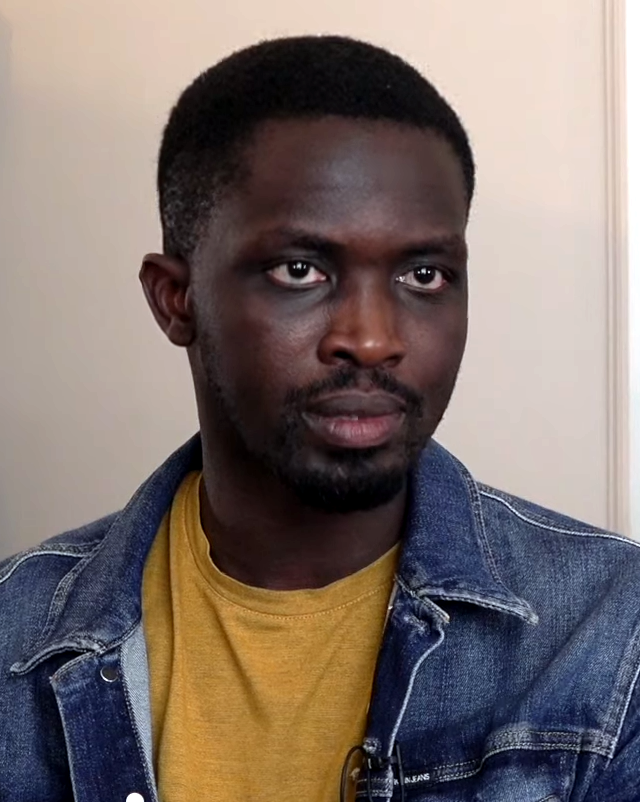
Mohamed Mbougar Sarr, author of the novel De purs hommes (2018).

- April: Senegalese writer Mohamed Mbougar Sarr publishes his novel De purs hommes (lit. 'Pure men'), inspired by real events and addressing the issue of homophobia in Senegal and the rejection of góor-jigéen people, a Wolof term used to designate certain LGBTQ people.

=== 2020 ===
- September: Ten men, allegedly homosexual, are arrested by a religious militia in Touba, then beaten and publicly displayed in a town square.

=== 2021 ===
- May 23: A march organized by Islamic religious groups takes place in Dakar to demand stricter anti-homosexual laws.
- June: Homophobic attacks against LGBTQ people are reported in various cities across the country.
- November: Writer Mohamed Mbougar Sarr receives hate attacks on social media after winning the Prix Goncourt in France, which led internet users to discover his novel De purs hommes (2018) and to claim that Mbougar was promoting homosexuality.

=== 2022 ===
- February 20: A new march is held to demand the tightening of anti-LGBTQ laws.
- May 14: Senegalese footballer Idrissa Gueye, a player for the French team PSG, refuses to play in a match dedicated to the fight against homophobia. The decision draws criticism in France but is applauded in Senegal, even receiving support from President Macky Sall.

=== 2023 ===
- October 28: A mob of about 200 people exhumed the body of a man believed to be gay and set it on fire in a public square in Kaolack, claiming they could not allow gay people to be buried in cemeteries.

=== 2025 ===
- July: Senegalese authorities ban the screening of the LGBTQ documentary MIWA (Nous Sommes Là), which was being organized in Dakar by the Dutch embassy and the Office of the United Nations High Commissioner for Human Rights.

=== 2026 ===
- February 7: Police arrest twelve men for allegedly committing homosexual acts, including television presenter Pape Cheikh Diallo and singer Djiby Dramé. The incident became the most publicized case of homophobic repression in the country in years.
- March 27: Senegalese President Bassirou Diomaye Faye enacts a new anti-homosexuality law that increases the penalty for LGBTQ individuals from five to ten years in prison and establishes a sentence of up to seven years for "promoting an unnatural act." The law was passed by parliament on March 11 of the same year and was first used to secure a conviction ten days after its enactment.

== See also ==
- LGBTQ rights in Senegal
