= Marième Ndiaye =

Senegalese politician (born 1992)

Marième Soda Ndiaye
- Born: January 25, 1992 (age 34)
- Citizenship: Senegalese
- Occupation: Politician
- Years active: 2017-present

Marième Soda Ndiaye (born on January 25,1992) is a Senegalese politician and a member of the 13th Senegalese parliament elected on the support of coalition of Dare the Future. Elected at the age of 27 in 2017, she was the youngest member of the 13th assembly. Before her election, she was the president of Network of French-speaking Digital Entrepreneurs (Renf).

== Career ==
Ndiaye was elected to the 13th Senegalese parliament in 2017 with the support of the Dare the Future coalition, replacing Aïssata Tall Sall, the coalition's leader, following her appointment as minister special envoy of the head of state. She was the youngest MP in the 13th assembly, aged 27. In April 2022, she joined a newly formed Alternative for a Rupture Assembly (AAR) coalition. On 30 December 2022, she resigned from the AAR and Dare the Future coalitions.
