= Party for Unity and Rally =

Political party in Senegal

Party for Unity and Rally Parti de l'Unité et du Rassemblement
- Abbreviation: PUR
- Leader: Serigne Moustapha Sy
- Founded: 3 February 1998
- Headquarters: Dakar, Senegal
- Ideology: Islamism; Islamic democracy Mixed economy Social conservatism
- Political position: Right-wing
- Religion: Sunni Islam
- National affiliation: Sàmm Sa Kàddu (since 2024); Liberate the People (2021–2024)
- Colours: Green and white

Website
- parti-pur.com

The Party for Unity and Rally (French: Parti de l'Unité et du Rassemblement; PUR) is an Islamist political party in Senegal. The party was founded in 1998 and is led by Cheikh Mouhamadou Moustapha Sy. The party won three seats at the 2017 parliamentary election. In September 2021 it joined Ousmane Sonko's Liberate the People alliance. During the following year the coalition contested first the 2022 local elections, winning in several major cities including Dakar, and later the 2022 national election, gaining 56 seats and becoming the second biggest coalition in the National Assembly. Its colours are green and white; its symbol is two doves facing each other.

== Election results ==
=== Presidential elections ===
Election	Candidate	First Round		Second Round		Result
Election	Candidate	Votes	%	Votes	%	Result
2019	Issa Sall	178,613	4.03%	—N/a		Lost ✗
2024	Aliou Mamadou Dia	125,690	2.80%	—N/a		Lost ✗

=== National Assembly elections ===
Year	Leader	Votes	%	Seats	+/–	Rank	Status
2017	Issa Sall	155,407	4.69%	3 / 165	New	▲4th	Opposition
2022 (Note: Run as part of the Liberate the People coalition.)	Serigne Moustapha Sy	1,071,139	32.85%	56 / 165	▲53	▲2nd	Opposition
2024 (Note: Run as part of the Sàmm Sa Kàddu coalition.)	Serigne Moustapha Sy	222,060	6.13%	3 / 165	▼53	▼4th	Opposition
