= 2022 Senegalese local elections =

Senegalese local elections

The Senegalese local elections of 2022 took place on 23 January 2022 in order to renew the members of the municipal councils as well as the mayors of Senegal. Departmental elections were held on the same day.

They were originally scheduled for 2019, but were postponed.

== Results ==
Results in the 20 most populous cities
N°	City	Mayor	Status	Coalition
1	Pikine	Abdoulaye Timbo	Re-elected	Benno Bokk Yakaar
2	Dakar	Barthélémy Dias	New mayor	Yewwi Askan Wi
3	Touba	Abdoul Ahad Ka	Re-elected	Benno Bokk Yakaar
4	Guediawaye	Ahmed Aidara	New mayor	Yewwi Askan Wi
5	Thiès	Babacar Diop	New mayor	Yewwi Askan Wi
6	Kaolack	Serigne Mboup	New mayor	And Nawlé
7	M'Bour	Cheikh Issa Sall	New mayor	Benno Bokk Yakaar
8	Rufisque	Oumar Cisse	New mayor	Yewwi Askan Wi
9	Saint-Louis	Mansour Faye	Re-elected	Benno Bokk Yakaar
10	Ziguinchor	Ousmane Sonko	New mayor	Yewwi Askan Wi
11	Diourbel	Malick Fall	Re-elected	Wallu Sénégal
12	Tambacounda	Papa Banda Dieye	New mayor	Le Choix de Tambacounda
13	Louga	Moustapha Diop	Re-elected	Benno Bokk Yakaar
14	Kolda	Mame Boye Diao	New mayor	Nay Leer - Benno Bokk Yakaar
15	Mbacke	Gallo Ba	New mayor	Benno Bokk Yakaar
16	Tivaouane	Demba Diop dit Diop Sy	New mayor	CPJE
17	Richard Toll	Amadou Mane Diop	Re-elected	Benno Bokk Yakaar
18	Bargny	Djibril Fall	Re-elected	Wallu Sénégal
19	Joal Fadhiout	Sophie Gladima	New mayor	Benno Bokk Yakaar
20	Kaffrine	Abdoulaye Seydou Sow	New mayor	Benno Bokk Yakaar
