= Lycee Malick SY =

High school in Senegal

Coordinates: 14°46′59″N 16°56′22″W

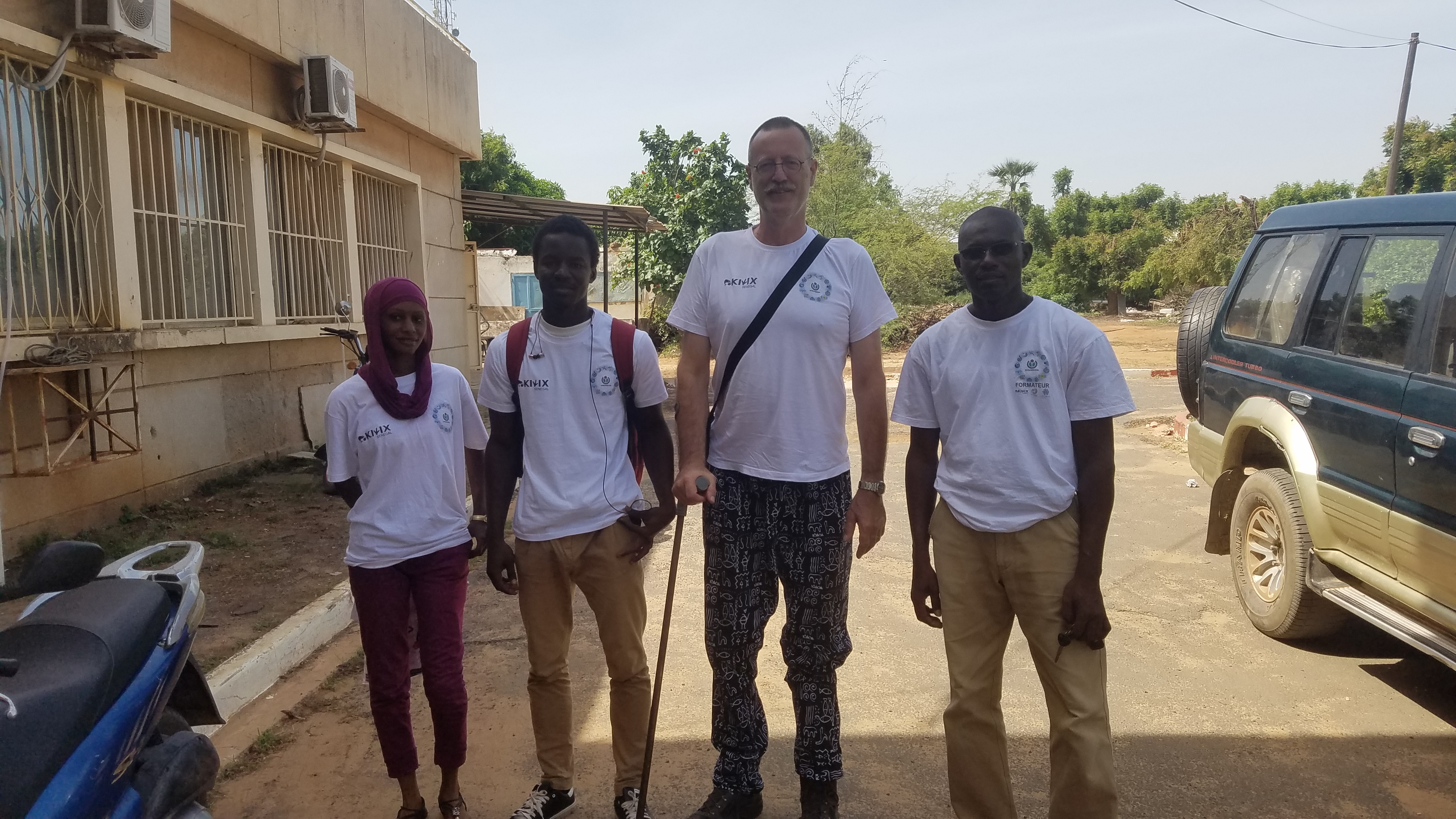
Pictures taken during one of the Kiwix program (offline Wikipedia) presentations given by the ambassadors in training. The presentation at the Lycée Malick Sy (Malick Sy high school) was given on October 23 2019 first front of 30 teachers, then 5 teachers were given a short training session.

El Hadji Malick Sy High School is one of the first high schools created in Senegal. It has 3414 students (according to Rapport Général de Rentrée 2012-2013) who spend three years at the end of which they take the Baccalaureate Exam. The school is located in Thiès, (a region, 72 kilometers far from Dakar, the capital city of Senegal) in a neighborhood called ‘Cité Malick Sy', and next to the Thiès Gendarmerie headquarters.

== History ==
El Hadji Malick SY High School was created in 1965. Its first headmaster is Mr. Jean GNING. At the beginning there were only two buildings for the classrooms (blocks A and B), the administrative building and the library. Blocks C, D and the dormitory were later built. The dormitory is now called Block E and is used to hold classrooms. The dormitories show that Malick Sy used to be a boarding school with both Junior High and High School students. It was the main school of the region and one of the most famous and best schools in Senegal. Many generations of bright students have been educated there. Some of the current teachers of the school have even been Malick Sy students and are now the colleagues of their former teachers! Due to that kind of process, the school has become a real family for many people. Alumni come from everywhere to either support or just visit their former school. Going back there is like a pilgrimage for many generations.

== The Godfather ==
El Hadji Malick Sy was a respected and venerated religious leader born in Gaya, Saint-Louis (northern Senegal) in 1847 from a Fulani family. Maodo Malick –his nickname- traveled to Mauritania for religious training, and then returned to Saint-Louis in 1884. He went on pilgrimage to Mecca. When he came back from Mecca, he went to teach in Louga and Pire before establishing a ‘Zawiya' (religious center) in Tivaouane in 1902. El Hadji Malick Sy has considerably contributed to the spread of the Tidjaniya brotherhood. He was a very responsible and devout Muslim, and he worked for his country and his religion up to his passing in 1922.

== The Baobab Tree ==
Situated right at the entrance of the school, the Baobab is the symbol of El Hadji Malick SY High School. It is older than the school itself and can be seen from a long distance away. Along with the picture of the Godfather, the baobab is represented on all the official documents of the school and the uniforms of students.

== The Administration ==
The administration plays a huge and difficult role in the school. It is composed of the Headmaster, his Deputy, Teachers, Superintendents, a Bursar, a Social Assistant and a Nurse. Each of them has a specific work to do for the school and towards students.

a- The Headmaster & The Deputy Headmaster

The current Headmaster is Mr. Ahmed Iyane DIOP. His Deputy is Mr. Cheikh Tidjane KEITA. They both used to teach respectively Physical Education and Philosophy in the school. The Headmaster rules the administration. He is responsible for everything that happens in the school and is backed up by the Deputy Headmaster. The latter controls teachers, students and makes sure discipline and order prevail in the school. He assists and replaces the Headmaster when needed. They are the highest authorities of the school.

b- Superintendents & Teachers

The superintendents keep an eye on students' attendance. In case the latter need to be absent they have to go to see them in order to have valid justifications that could allow them to keep attending classes when back. The deputy Headmaster also works with them about students' reports. Beyond giving knowledge, there are teachers who do their best to make students be in good working conditions. They tutor clubs, organize students in educational groups and alert them on things related to their day-to-day life. They cheer them up when they want to give up because studying is sometimes hard, and they help them to behave well the whole year long.

== Subjects ==
At Malick SY High School students learn many interesting subjects which help them have a wide range of choices after passing their Baccalaureate exam. There is a total of 14 subjects taught. Scientific branches have mathematics, physics and chemistry and biology as majors. They use two labs. One of them was totally renewed and renovated by the Hope Project for Senegal last year. It's now called Papa Mballo Diallo Lab. The literary branches learn French, English, history & geography, philosophy and foreign languages- Spanish, Portuguese, German and Arabic. This year, we're lucky enough to have an English library thanks to the help of the HOPE Project for Senegal, again! It's called Malick Sy English Corner and is dedicated to a former English Club member who died in 2012. His name is Papa Mamadou Sow. All branches have Physical Education- with 3 football playgrounds, 2 basketball fields, 2 handball fields, a Senegalese Wrestling arena and a gymnasium. Due to the lack of space and facilities, many other schools from different neighborhoods come to Malick SY to do P.E.

== Students ==
Students of El Hadji Malick SY High School represent their school in various capacities. The institution has trained members of the Senegalese intelligentsia, including individuals who have achieved national and international prominence. Students also represent the high school in competitions such as the Senegalese General Contest and the English Lovers Awards.

== The School Government ==
The School Government is an organization supervised by the administration and led by students. It's been created to be the voice of students in administrative, social and educational matters. It's made up of a presidency and different commissions such as Sports, Human Rights, Finance, Culture, etc. It's also the link between the administration and the different clubs of the school. Those clubs (English, Literature, Arabic, German, Gymnastic, etc.) play a very active and associative role in the school. They are very creative and innovative in improving the levels and welfare of students. They are led by students and represent El Hadji Malick SY High School everywhere in Senegal.
