= 2022 Senegalese departmental elections =

Senegalese departmental elections

The Senegalese departmental elections of 2022 took place on 23 January 2022 in order to renew the members of the councils of the 45 departments of Senegal. Local elections were held on the same day.

They were originally scheduled for 2019, but were postponed.
