= 2021 Senegalese protests =

- Date: 3 March 2021 – 8 March 2021
- Location: Senegal
- Caused by: Arrest of Ousmane Sonko over rape allegations; Government mishandling of the COVID-19 pandemic
- Goals: Resignation of President Macky Sall; Release of opposition leader
- Methods: Demonstrations, Riots, Civil resistance
- Status: Ended
- Result: Protests suppressed by force

Parties
Protesters: Protesters and dissidents of the government; Supporters of Ousmane Sonko; Opposition parties	Armed Forces of Senegal: Riot police

Lead figures
(Senegal) Ousmane Sonko	(Senegal) Macky Sall

Deaths and injuries
- Deaths: 13
- Injuries: 10+

The 2021 Senegalese protests were a series of mass protests and rioting against the arrest of opposition leader Ousmane Sonko over rape allegations which left 13 dead in Senegal during early March. Protests occurred starting throughout Senegal on 3 March, when hundreds gathered to protest the opposition leader's arrest. Thousands took to the streets over the next 3 days and internet was restricted to curb the protests.

== Background ==
Since 2012, Macky Sall has been president of Senegal. In December 2020, Sall suggested running for a third term in 2024 just six months after signing a law which abolished the post of Prime Minister of Senegal.

The protests began after the opposition leader was arrested for allegations of rape of schoolgirls. He has denied any allegations and has claimed that President Macky Sall is trying to arrest him. The opposition leader called for protests in support of the opposition and for the creation of an anti-government movement. The protests came under the slogan "Trop c'est trop", meaning "Enough is Enough".

Initial protests and public strikes began with anti-lockdown demonstrations in 5-13 January in Pikine, Yoff and Dakar, leaving clashes with police, who fire tear gas. The protests in the country turned violent on 8-10 February, when rioters clashed with police after they marched towards parliament after allegations of rape in Dakar.

== Protests ==
Noisy protests broke out in Dakar and spread nation-wide as protests calling for opposition leader's release intensified on Wednesday, 3 March. After two days of protests and rioting against his arrest, thousands gathered at the Presidential office and clashed with riot police and security forces, who fired tear gas canisters and rubber bullets to disperse growing anti-government protests. According to Human Rights Watch live ammunition was used against protesters.

Protests continued despite violence at the University of Dakar on Friday, 5 March, in which 2-4 protesters were killed during the mass protest movement as protesters rolled stones at police striking tanks and firing tear gas at protesters, who in return set up roadblocks and barricades in Dakar. Demonstrations intensified the next day, with hundreds participating in rallies outside the prison Ousmane Sonko is in.

During the protest, the use of Facebook, Twitter, WhatsApp and Telegram on cellular networks was disrupted.

In June 2023, the response to the protests turned increasingly violent, with Amnesty International counting 23 fatalities, most of which were caused by bullets fired by police or armed police collaborators.

== Aftermath ==
In the aftermath of the unrest, the government announced an inquiry. While the official government death toll remains at five, opposition members claimed thirteen died in the unrest.

On March 8, lawyers announced Sonko would be released on bail with the condition that he cannot travel without the prior permission of a judge and must refrain from commenting to the public and media on the rape case.

== See also ==
- 2007-2008 Senegalese protests
- 2021 Paraguayan protests
- 2023 Senegalese protests
