= École Française Docteur René Guillet =

French international school in Thiès, Senegal

Coordinates: 14.7961°N 16.9285°W

- Thiès; Senegal

Information
- School type: International School
- Age: 3 to 18
- Enrollment: 134 (2014-2015)
- Language: French

École Française Docteur René Guillet is a French international school in Thiès, Senegal. It serves levels petite section (preschool) through terminale, the final year of lycée (senior high school). It had 134 students as of the 2014–2015 school year. It uses the distance education programme from the National Centre for Distance Education (CNED) for collège (junior high school) and lycée.
