= Party for Truth and Development =

Political party in Senegal

Party for Truth and Development Parti de la Vérité pour le Développement (PVD)
- Chairman: Cheikh Ahmadou Kara Mbacké
- Founded: May 6, 2004

The Party for Truth and Development (French: Parti de la Vérité pour le Développement, PVD) is a political party in Senegal. The chairman of the party is Cheikh Ahmadou Kara Mbacké.

== History ==
The party was registered on 6 May 2004. Also known as the Party of God's Truth (French: Partie de la Verité de Dieu), the PVD is drawn from young unemployed men in Dakar's suburbs, as well as a faction of the Baye Fall Mouride sect. Kara Mbacké has become very controversial in Senegal. A grandson of the revered founder of the Mourides, he and his organisations have alternated between conflict and conciliation with the government and mainstream Mourides. He has paraded followers in black uniforms, declared himself "President" and alternated the titles of "Cheikh" and "General". In 2005, he backed down from challenging the government in presidential elections under pressure from his family (who still lead the Mouride movement). In November 2006, a month after announcing he would direct his followers to support opposition leader Idrissa Seck, his followers came into conflict with local police, and his compound was raided.

The party contested national elections for the first time in 2012, winning two seats in the National Assembly. In the 2017 legislative elections, the party fell to one seat.
