= Amadou Mame Diop =

Senegalese politician

President of the National Assembly
- In office 12 September 2022 – 2 December 2024
- Preceded by: Moustapha Niasse
- Succeeded by: Malick Ndiaye

Personal details
- Born: 18 July 1965 (age 61)
- Party: Alliance for the Republic
- Education: Cheikh Anta Diop University

Amadou Mame Diop (born 18 July 1965) is a Senegalese politician who served as the President and Speaker of the National Assembly of Senegal from 12 September 2022 to 2 December 2024. He is also mayor of the municipality of Richard-Toll (northern Senegal) and the managing director of Société Aménagement de la Petite Côte.

== Education ==
Diop holds a doctorate in pharmacy from Cheikh Anta Diop University in Dakar and a DESS in pharmacy distribution and management.

== Professional background ==
Diop is a community pharmacist and pharmacy owner in the city of Richard-Toll. He was the general manager of the company for the development and promotion of the coasts and tourist areas of Senegal between 2021 and 2022.

== Political background ==
Diop made his political debut in 2008 with the creation of the Alliance for the Republic by Macky Sall. In July 2012, he was elected deputy on the Dagana departmental list of the Benno Bokk Yakaar coalition, of which he is a member of the parliamentary group. During his tenure, he was a member of the WAEMU Interparliamentary Committee.

Since July 2012, Diop has been mayor of the municipality of Richard-Toll.

He was re-elected deputy in the legislative elections of 2022 and was elected President of the National Assembly on 12 September 2022, thus becoming the second personality of the State. His election to the presidency of the Assembly came as a surprise: the main contenders for the presidency, including Aminata Touré, head of the APR list in the legislative elections, are not retained by the coalition.
