= 2021 Paraguayan protests =

Protest

2021 Paraguayan protests ("#EstoyParaElMarzoParaguayo2021")
- Part of Protests over responses to the COVID-19 pandemic
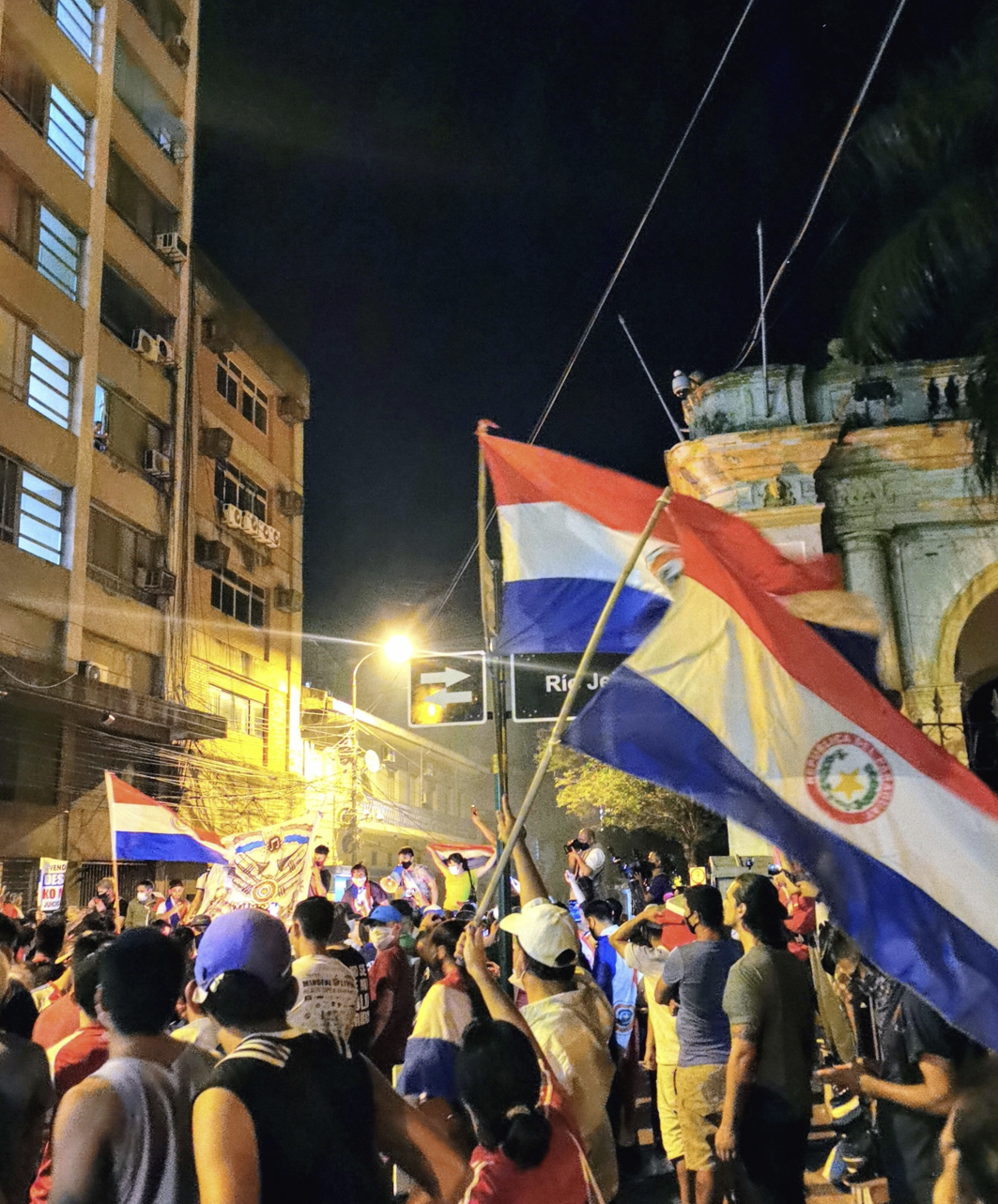
- Date: March 5, 2021 – March 26, 2021
- Location: Paraguay
- Caused by: Health policies of Mario Abdo Benitez; Handling of COVID-19 pandemic in the country
- Goals: Resignation of President Mario Abdo Benitez; Better handling of COVID-19
- Methods: Demonstrations
- Result: Protests suppressed by force; Resignation of ministers and health/interior minister

Deaths and injuries
- Death: 1
- Injuries: 20

The 2021 Paraguayan protests were a series of mass protests and violent demonstrations against the government's response to the COVID-19 pandemic in Paraguay during March 2021, calling for the resignation of Mario Abdo Benítez and his entire cabinet. The demonstrations left hundreds injured and many critically wounded after citizen protests and looting across the country. It resulted in the resignation of health minister Julio Mazzoleni.

== Background ==
Paraguay has a history of protests, with the 2017 Paraguayan crisis, the 2012 protests over the impeachment of Fernando Lugo, the 1999 Marzo paraguayo unrest and the 1986 protests. The political crisis is the worst since the 2017 protests. Gunshots were heard during the protests as protesters formed roadblocks and ignited barricades in the country. The government hasn't faced this kind of protests at all, refusing to resign and cracking down on protests harshly.

== Protests ==
The protests began on 5 March after protesters staged Cacerolazo in Asunción, then turning out to protest the turmoil and calling for the political government to step down. Fires and smoke arose across Asunción as city-wide protests turned into widespread violence and rioting.

Protesters chanted slogans against the government and marched with pots despite rubber bullets, tear gas, live ammunition and water cannons fired at protesters by the attacking Riot police, being the most violent protests since the 2017 Paraguayan crisis.

Hundreds threw stones and set fires across the country as well, but in smaller magnitude. Anger over the response led to calls for the government to resign amid violent riots and clashes with the security forces, loyal to Mario Abdo Benitez.

As protests and popular demonstrations escalated the next day, police presence became heightened and small scuffles with protesters resulted in the rallies being quelled with hundreds injured. Protesters repeatedly marched in organised rallies peacefully in red-colourful shirts the next day, and participating in Cacerolazo across the capital and country.

== See also ==
- 2017 Paraguayan crisis
- 2021 Senegalese protests
