= Youssou Diagne =

Senegalese politician (1938–2022)

Youssou Diagne (29 August 1938 – 18 November 2022) was a Senegalese politician who was the seventh President of the National Assembly, from 2001 to 2002.

== Biography ==
Born in Mbour, he studied at the Catholic school in Popenguine and then in Diourbel before becoming a teacher in Gossas. He continued to train in management and finance and secured a position with the Air Afrique airline.

In 1992, Diagne joined the Senegalese Democratic Party, which was part of the Sopi Coalition which won the 2001 parliamentary elections, Diagne becoming the seventh president of the National Assembly. But, after losing in the local elections in Ngaparou the following year, he was forced to resign his presidency on 12 June 2002 to be succeeded by Pape Diop.

Diagne was then appointed ambassador to Taiwan. On his return he became Chairman of the Board of Directors of APIX, the national agency for the promotion of investment and major civil works.

Diagne died on 18 November 2022, at the age of 84.
