= Ahmadou Al Aminou Lo =

Prime Minister of Senegal since 2026

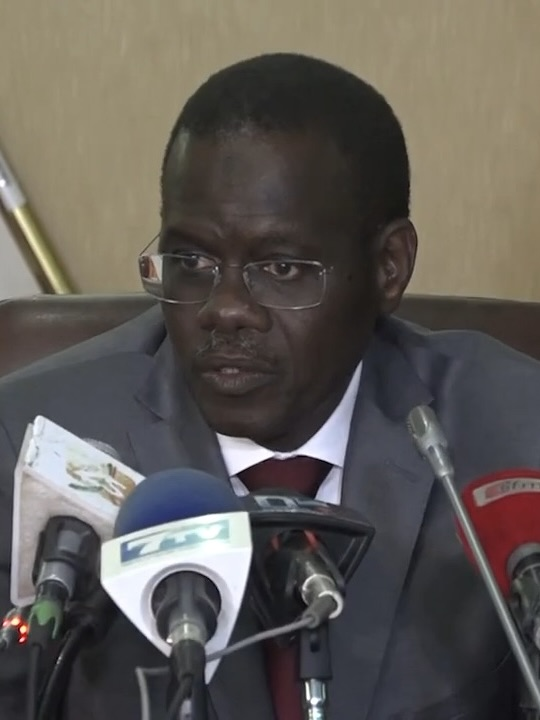
- Lo in 2020

Prime Minister of Senegal
- Incumbent
- Assumed office 25 May 2026
- President: Bassirou Diomaye Faye
- Preceded by: Ousmane Sonko

Personal details
- Born: 28 March 1966 (age 60) Louga, Senegal
- Party: Independent
- Occupation: Politician; Economist

Ahmadou Al Aminou Lo (born 28 March 1966) is a Senegalese economist who is the current Prime Minister of Senegal since 25 May 2026. He worked many years at the Central Bank of West African States (BCEAO), including as Secretary-General. Lo was appointed to the Senegalese government in April 2024 and was named Prime Minister by President Bassirou Diomaye Faye in May 2026 after the removal of Ousmane Sonko from office.

== Biography ==
Lo attended the Prytanée militaire de Saint-Louis (Saint-Louis Military Academy) in Saint-Louis, Senegal, where he earned a baccalauréat scientifique in 1985 and graduated at the top of his class. He later received a master's degree in economics from Cheikh Anta Diop University and received a diploma in banking techniques from the Centre Ouest-Africain de Formation et d'Études Bancaires (West African Center for Banking Training and Studies). He also obtained an executive master's degree in Islamic finance from INCEIF University in Malaysia.

Lo worked for many years at the Central Bank of West African States (BCEAO), starting in 1987. He held various roles, including head of the treasury, head of market operations, director of banking activities and economic financing, and director general of organization and information systems. He was named National Director for Senegal in December 2016, then became advisor to the governor in 2021, **concurrently with his role as National Director** and Secretary-General of the BCEAO in February 2024. Lo has been known for his defense of the CFA franc against calls for replacement, "consistently champion[ing] the stability of this currency, asserting that it fulfills all the essential functions of money and maintains a robust external equilibrium".

After President Bassirou Diomaye Faye took office in April 2024, Lo became a member of his administration, receiving the position of Minister-Secretary General. In April 2025, Lo was named Senior Minister and was assigned to lead the national transformation agenda, "Sénégal 2050". On 25 May 2026, he was appointed the new Prime Minister of Senegal, succeeding Ousmane Sonko. Sonko had been dismissed several days earlier after his relationship with Faye soured, amidst debt issues in the country.
