= Daouda Sow (politician) =

Senegalese politician (1933–2009)

Daouda Sow (1933 – December 6, 2009) was a Senegalese politician and legislator. He served as the President of the National Assembly from 1984 to 1988. He was a member of the Socialist Party of Senegal (PS) and served as the party's Secretary General.

== Life and career ==
Sow first joined the Senegalese Popular Bloc (SPB) in 1956.

He was elected as a member of the Senegalese Parliament from 1963 to 1970. He became Senegal's Minister of Health under Prime Minister Abdou Diouf in 1970, a position he held until 1972. He next served as Minister of Communications and Relations with Parliament, as well as a spokesperson for the government, from 1973 to 1980.

In 1981, Sow became the Minister of Defense within the first administration of Prime Minister Habib Thiam. One year later, in 1982, Sow also became the Defense Minister within the first cabinet of the Senegambia Confederation.

Sow was elected the President of the National Assembly of Senegal on April 12, 1984, succeeding Habib Thiam. He was re-elected in April 1988. He was forced to resign as President of the Assembly on December 9, 1988, and was succeeded by Abdoul Aziz Ndaw.

Sow remained a member of the PS until his death. He also worked as the PS coordinator for Linguère Department.

Daouda Sow died in Dakar of a long illness on December 6, 2009, at the age of 76. A funeral was held in Dakar and was attended by many prominent Senegalese politicians, including Abdoulaye Bathily, Moustapha Niasse, Djibo Kâ, Habib Sy and Mamadou Seck. Sow was buried in the village of Kamb, Linguère Department, Senegal.
