= 2007–2008 Senegalese protests =

Protests and riots in Senegal

The 2007–2008 Senegalese protests were ongoing opposition protests and civil demonstrations, riots and strikes in Senegal over many issues. One of the main issues were deteriorating economic conditions and food price hikes due to the 2007–2008 world food price crisis. Hundreds attended rallies from January, March and September, before the biggest wave of protests. Demonstrators were met with bullets and tear gas. Water cannon was also shot at demonstrators demanding democratic reforms and justice from the government, yet the resignation of president Abdoulaye Wade. Thousands threw stones on demonstrators in November 2007, after a week-long uprising and bloody crackdown nationwide. Clashes between protesters and security forces, who launched strike action. After protests in December, protests calmed and ceased for 2–3 months until March–April 2008 when tanks was deployed after opposition protests and food riots in Dakar. Four people were killed in the uprising and ensuing clashes. Violent protests rocked the country until 28 April 2008, when two demonstrators were killed in clashes.

== See also ==
- 2011–2012 Senegalese protests
- 2021 Senegalese protests
