= Wallu Sénégal =

Save Senegal Wallu Sénégal
- Abbreviation: WS
- Leader: Abdoulaye Wade
- Founded: 8 October 2021
- Dissolved: 2024 (de facto)
- Preceded by: Manko Wattu Sénégal
- Succeeded by: Takku Wallu Sénégal
- Ideology: Liberalism
- Political position: Centre
- Member parties: Senegalese Democratic Party; Jotna Coalition; Democratic Renaissance Congress
- Colours: Light blue, Yellow

Website
- Facebook page

The Wallu Sénégal Grand Coalition (lit. 'Save Senegal', WS) was a Senegalese opposition political coalition led by Former President Abdoulaye Wade, and his Senegalese Democratic Party. The party has entered into an alliance with the opposition Yewwi Askan Wi coalition to form a majority in the 2022 parliamentary election. As a result of the election the coalition obtained 24 seats becoming the third largest group in the National Assembly.

== Composition ==
The coalition was composed of the following parties:

Party	Abbr.	Leader	Ideology	Membership
Senegalese Democratic Party; Parti démocratique sénégalais	PDS	Abdoulaye Wade	Liberalism	2021–2024
JOTNA Coalition - Patriots for the Alternative; Coalition JOTNA - Patriotes pour l’Alternative	JOTNA	Gaoussou Koma		2021–2022
Democratic Renaissance Congress; Congrès de la Renaissance Démocratique	CRD			2021–2024

== Electoral history ==
=== National Assembly elections ===
Election	Party leader	Votes	%	Seats	+/–	Position	Status
2022	Abdoulaye Wade	471,517	14.46%	24 / 165	New	▲3rd	Opposition
