= Cheikh Abdoul Khadre Cissokho =

Cheikh Abdoul Khadre Cissokho (born 1936) is a Senegalese agricultural engineer and politician. He is the former Minister and President of the Senegalese National Assembly from 1993 to 2001.
