= 2017 Senegalese parliamentary election =

- 30 July 2017
- All 165 seats in the National Assembly; 83 seats needed for a majority
- Turnout: 53.66%
Party	Leader	Vote %	Seats
BBY	Mohammed Dionne	49.47	125
MWS	Abdoulaye Wade	16.68	19
MTS	Khalifa Sall	11.73	7
PUR	Issa Sall	4.69	3
Kaddu Askan Wi	Abdoulaye Baldé	1.97	2
Ndawi Askan Wi		1.13	1
MYS		1.00	1
CPJE		0.89	1
Oser l'avenir		0.74	1
And Saxal Liggeey		0.70	1
PVD	Cheikh Ahmadou Kara Mbacké	0.69	1
PA3V		0.59	1
IPD		0.58	1
Bunt Bi		0.55	1
This lists parties that won seats. See the complete results below.
Prime Minister before	Prime Minister after election
Mohammed Dionne; Independent	Mohammed Dionne; Independent

Parliamentary elections were held in Senegal on 30 July 2017 to elect the 165 members of the National Assembly after being postponed from the originally scheduled date of 2 July. President Macky Sall's United in Hope coalition won a landslide victory and maintained its overall majority.

== Background ==
The original election date was chosen on 1 December 2016 after a meeting between the President of Senegal Macky Sall and the Opposition in the National Assembly.

The coalition of parties supporting President Sall, Benno Bokk Yaakaar, sought to retain the parliamentary majority it obtained in the 2012 parliamentary election. It included Sall's party, the Alliance for the Republic, as well as the Socialist Party and the Alliance of the Forces of Progress. The coalition's national candidate list was headed by Prime Minister Mohammed Dionne.

Plans for a united opposition coalition that would incorporate the Senegalese Democratic Party of Abdoulaye Wade as well as the supporters of imprisoned Dakar Mayor Khalifa Sall were ultimately scuttled in late May 2017 because the two sides could not agree on who should head the coalition's candidate list. Consequently the two sides decided to stand separately, with Wade and Khalifa Sall each heading their respective lists. The opposition's failure to unite was viewed as a boon for President Sall, making it appear more likely that he would keep his parliamentary majority; if his supporters lost, he would be forced into cohabitation for the remaining two years of his term, greatly curtailing his powers.

== Electoral system ==
The 165 members of the National Assembly are elected by two methods; 90 are elected by either first-past-the-post or party bloc vote in single- or multi-member constituencies based on the departments, with an additional 15 elected by overseas voters. The other 60 seats are elected from a nationwide constituency by proportional representation, with seats allocated initially using the simple quotient, with remaining seats allocated using the largest remainder method.

== Campaign ==
The official campaign period began on 8 July. Wade, who had been living in France, returned to Dakar on 10 July to begin campaigning for his coalition, Manko Wattu Sénégal. A record number of parties, 47, contested the elections.

== Results ==
Voter turnout was reported to be 54%. Prime Minister Dionne, speaking on 31 July, said that the pro-Sall Benno Bokk Yaakaar coalition had prevailed in 42 out of the 45 departments of Senegal (all but Kédougou, Saraya and "probably" Mbacké). The opposition coalition led by Khalifa Sall, however, said that it had won in Dakar, the capital. Results for Dakar released on 3 August showed Benno Bokk Yaakaar slightly ahead of Khalifa Sall's coalition, Manko Taxawu Sénégal.

Provisional results released on 4 August showed Benno Bokk Yaakaar winning 125 out of 165 seats, a strong majority. The two main opposition coalitions trailed distantly; Manko Wattu Sénégal (led by Wade) obtained 19 seats and Manko Taxawu Sénégal (led by Khalifa Sall) obtained seven seats. The presidential coalition was slightly short of a majority in the vote count, receiving 49.5% of the votes.

Party	Votes	%	Seats		
Party	Votes	%	National	Departmental	Total
United in Hope	1,637,761	49.47	30	95	125
Manko Wattu Sénégal	552,095	16.68	10	9	19
Manko Taxawu Sénégal	388,188	11.73	7	0	7
Party for Unity and Rally	155,407	4.69	3	0	3
Kaddu Askan Wi	65,235	1.97	1	1	2
Ndawi Askan Wi	37,535	1.13	1	0	1
Manko Yeesal Sénégal	33,130	1.00	1	0	1
Patriotic Convergence for Justice and Equity	29,596	0.89	1	0	1
Oser l'avenir	24,342	0.74	1	0	1
National Alliance for Democracy – And Saxal Liggeey	23,142	0.70	1	0	1
Party for Truth and Development	22,769	0.69	1	0	1
Alternative Pole Third Voice	19,675	0.59	1	0	1
Initiative for a Policy of Development	19,211	0.58	1	0	1
Bunt Bi	18,268	0.55	1	0	1
Union for Federalism and Democracy	17,636	0.53	0	0	0
Senegal Can Kanam Coalition	16,142	0.49	0	0	0
Manko Wattu Senegal coalition	14,681	0.44	0	0	0
Movement for Republican Renewal	14,255	0.43	0	0	0
Joyyanti Coalition	14,231	0.43	0	0	0
Défar Senegal	14,179	0.43	0	0	0
And Défar Sénégal/Group of Support and Renewal of Public Action	13,145	0.40	0	0	0
And Suxali Senegal Coalition	12,541	0.38	0	0	0
Rally for Dignity and Prosperity	11,415	0.34	0	0	0
Democratic Federation of Ecologists of Senegal	10,957	0.33	0	0	0
Leeral Coalition	9,689	0.29	0	0	0
Party of Peace	8,850	0.27	0	0	0
Convergence of the Initiatives for Senegal	8,776	0.27	0	0	0
Neneen Citizen Convention	8,727	0.26	0	0	0
Mbollo Wade	8,093	0.24	0	0	0
Sunu Party for Solidarity and the Development of Senegal	7,758	0.23	0	0	0
Alternative Visions for Senegal	7,590	0.23	0	0	0
Fal Askan Wi Coalition	7,474	0.23	0	0	0
Framework of Reflection for Integral Development	7,295	0.22	0	0	0
Soppali Coalition	7,268	0.22	0	0	0
The Third Policy Coalition/Euttou Askan Wi	7,033	0.21	0	0	0
National Front/Baatu Askan Wi	6,605	0.20	0	0	0
Party for Citizen Action	6,551	0.20	0	0	0
Senegal-Vein Environment	6,398	0.19	0	0	0
Senegalese Democratic Rally	6,099	0.18	0	0	0
Alliance for Reform and Development	5,664	0.17	0	0	0
Citizens for Ethics and Transparency/Jerin Sama Reew	4,980	0.15	0	0	0
Dental Senegal/Patriotic Action	4,300	0.13	0	0	0
Movement for Renewal, Freedom and Development	4,193	0.13	0	0	0
Patriotic Liberal Convergence	3,301	0.10	0	0	0
Republican Patriotic Front	3,156	0.10	0	0	0
Bi Nu Bëgg Assembly Coalition	2,951	0.09	0	0	0
Rally for Ethics and Emerging Values	2,148	0.06	0	0	0
Total	3,310,435	100.00	60	105	165
Valid votes	3,310,435	99.19			
Invalid/blank votes	27,059	0.81			
Total votes	3,337,494	100.00			
Registered voters/turnout	6,219,446	53.66			
Source: CENA

== Aftermath ==
Following the victory of Benno Bokk Yaakaar, President Sall reappointed Dionne as Prime Minister on 6 September 2017. Abdoulaye Wade, elected to the National Assembly as the top candidate on his coalition's candidate list, announced his resignation as a Deputy on 10 September, before the National Assembly even began meeting. He explained that his purpose in running was merely to support his coalition in the election.
