= Alternative for a Rupture Assembly =

Senegalese political coalition

Alternative for a Rupture Assembly (French: Alternative pour une assemblée de rupture, AAR) is a Senegalese political coalition formed in 2022 by the Republic of Values Party headed by Thierno Alassane Sall, the Awale party led by Abdourahman Diouf and AGIR movement chaired by Thierno Bocoum.

== Background ==
Thierno Alassane Sall, a former minister under the unrelated Macky Sall, is the coalition's chair. The coalition manifesto proposes several reforms including land governance, economic patriotism, food security, and parliamentary efficiency. The coalition's motto is for dialogue and arbitration of conflicts. The first election the coalition participated in was the July 31, 2022 parliamentary election in which Sall won its single seat.
