= Liberate the People =

Liberate the People Yewwi Askan Wi
- Abbreviation: YAW
- Leader: Barthélémy Dias; Ousmane Sonko; Khalifa Sall
- Founder: Ousmane Sonko
- Founded: 3 September 2021
- Dissolved: 2024
- Political position: Big tent
- Member parties: PASTEF; Party for Unity and Rally; Taxawu Senegaal; Republican Party for Progress; AND Saxal Liggeey
- Colours: Purple, Green

Website
- yewwi-askanwi.com

Liberate the People (French: Libérer le peuple; Wolof: Yewwi Askan Wi, YAW) was a Senegalese political coalition led by Ousmane Sonko. The coalition was opposed to former President Macky Sall and allied against him with the Wallu Sénégal alliance led by the Democratic Party of Senegal.

The party participated in the 2022 local elections, winning in several major cities, including Dakar. After the 2022 national election the coalition became the second biggest in the National Assembly and the main opposition force against Macky Sall obtaining 56 seats.

== Composition ==
The coalition was composed of the following parties:

Party	Abbr.	Leader	Ideology	Membership
African Patriots of Senegal for Work, Ethics and Fraternity; Patriotes africains du Sénégal pour le travail, l'éthique et la fraternité	PASTEF	Ousmane Sonko	Pan-Africanism	2021–2023
Party for Unity and Rally; Parti de l'Unité et du Rassemblement	PUR	Serigne Mouhamadou Moustapha Sy	Islamic democracy	2021–present
Manko Taxawu Sénégal	MTS	Khalifa Sall		2021–present
Republican Party for Progress; Parti républicain pour le Progrès	PRP	Déthié Fall		2021–present
National Alliance for Democracy - Saxal Liggeey; Alliance Nationale pour la Démocratie - Saxal Liggeey	AND	Aida Mbodji		2021–present

== Electoral history ==
=== National Assembly elections ===
Election	Party leader	Votes	%	Seats	+/–	Position	Status
2022	Ousmane Sonko	1,071,139	32.85%	56 / 165	New	▲2nd	Opposition
