= PASTEF =

African Patriots of Senegal for Work, Ethics and Fraternity Patriotes africains du Sénégal pour le travail, l'éthique et la fraternité
- Abbreviation: PASTEF; Patriots
- Leader: Ousmane Sonko
- Secretary-General: Ayib Daffé
- Founder: Ousmane Sonko
- Founded: January 2014
- Headquarters: 37 voie de Dégagement N, Dakar
- Ideology: Left-wing nationalism Pan-Africanism; Democratic socialism Social conservatism
- Political position: Left-wing
- National affiliation: Liberate the People (2021–2024)
- Colours: Red; Green
- Slogan: Le don de soi pour la Patrie ('Self-sacrifice for the Fatherland')
- National Assembly: 130 / 165 (79%)

Website
- pastef.org

The African Patriots of Senegal for Work, Ethics and Fraternity (French: Patriotes africains du Sénégal pour le travail, l'éthique et la fraternité; PASTEF), or just Patriots of Senegal (French: Patriotes du Sénégal), is a Senegalese political party founded in 2014 by Ousmane Sonko.

The party was banned by the Ministry of Interior and Public Security in 2023 after being accused of "frequently calling on its supporters to insurrectional movements, which has led to serious consequences, including loss of life, many wounded, as well as acts of looting of public and private property." The party announced it would appeal the decision both to the Court of Cassation and to the Court of Justice of ECOWAS.

In the 2024 Senegalese presidential election, the general secretary of PASTEF Bassirou Diomaye Faye was elected President of Senegal. On 27 March 2024, three days after Faye won the election, the decree dissolving the party was repealed.

== History ==
In a desire for political renewal, several young civil servants from the Senegalese public administration and from other backgrounds, united in a committee to create PASTEF in January 2014.

The party was defined above all as being a dynamic. Composed mainly of beginners in politics, nevertheless the personalities who make up the committee are qualified in trade union acts and public functions. Like taxation through its president.

In 2017, PASTEF joined the People's Alternative coalition for the legislative elections of that same year. This coalition is made up of several parties including: PASTEF, RND, MRDS, and others. During the final results, with 1.13% of the votes Ousmane Sonko - at the head of this coalition is elected deputy of the department of Dakar.

Two years after the first participation in the elections, the party embarked on the presidential campaign, in which the President of the Republic of Senegal Macky Sall is a candidate for his own succession. In a country where people under 20 represent 55% of the population, the young age of Ousmane Sonko compared to the other candidates and his virulent declarations resonate among young people. Thus achieving a very good result with 15.67% of the votes and a third place for his first participation. Outgoing President Macky Sall was re-elected in the first round with 58.26%.

In September 2021, Ousmane Sonko formalized the creation of a new opposition alliance, Liberate the People, that included other political formations such as the Party for Unity and Rally and Manko Taxawu Sénégal. During the following year the coalition contested first the 2022 local elections, winning in several major cities including Dakar, and later the 2022 national election, gaining 56 seats and becoming the second biggest coalition in the National Assembly.

On 31 May 2023, Sonko was sentenced to two years in prison for "corrupting youth"; the sentence prevented him from standing as the PASTEF candidate in the 2024 presidential election. Sonko's arrest and sentencing triggered protests in June throughout Senegal.

On 28 July 2023, Sonko was arrested on charges of encouraging an insurrection, undermining state security, creating political unrest, and criminal association. On 31 July, the interior minister of Senegal announced the dissolution of PASTEF for rallying its supporters during violent protests in June 2023 and March 2021. Following the announcements, protests were reported in Dakar and Ziguinchor; two people were reported to have died during protests in Ziguinchor.

On 27 March 2024, three days after the party's general secretary, Bassirou Diomaye Faye, won the presidential election, the decree dissolving the party was repealed by another decree signed by outgoing President Macky Sall.

In the 2024 Senegalese parliamentary election, PASTEF won a majority in the National Assembly. On 1 June 2026, Ousmane Sonko announced that PASTEF would not participate in the new government following disagreements with President Bassirou Diomaye Faye.

== Electoral results ==
=== Presidential elections ===
Election	Party candidate	Votes	%	Votes	%	Result
Election	Party candidate	First Round		Second Round		Result
2019	Ousmane Sonko	687,523	15.67%	—N/a		Lost ✗
2024	Bassirou Diomaye Faye	2,434,751	54.28%	—N/a		Won ✓

=== National Assembly elections ===
Year	Leader	Votes	%	Seats	+/–	Rank	Status
2017	Ousmane Sonko	Part of People's Alternative (Ndawi Askan Wi) coalition.					Opposition
2022	Ousmane Sonko	Part of Liberate the People coalition.					Opposition
2024	Ousmane Sonko	1,991,770	54.97%	130 / 165	▲107	▲1st	Government
