= Thiès =

Thiès Chess
- City
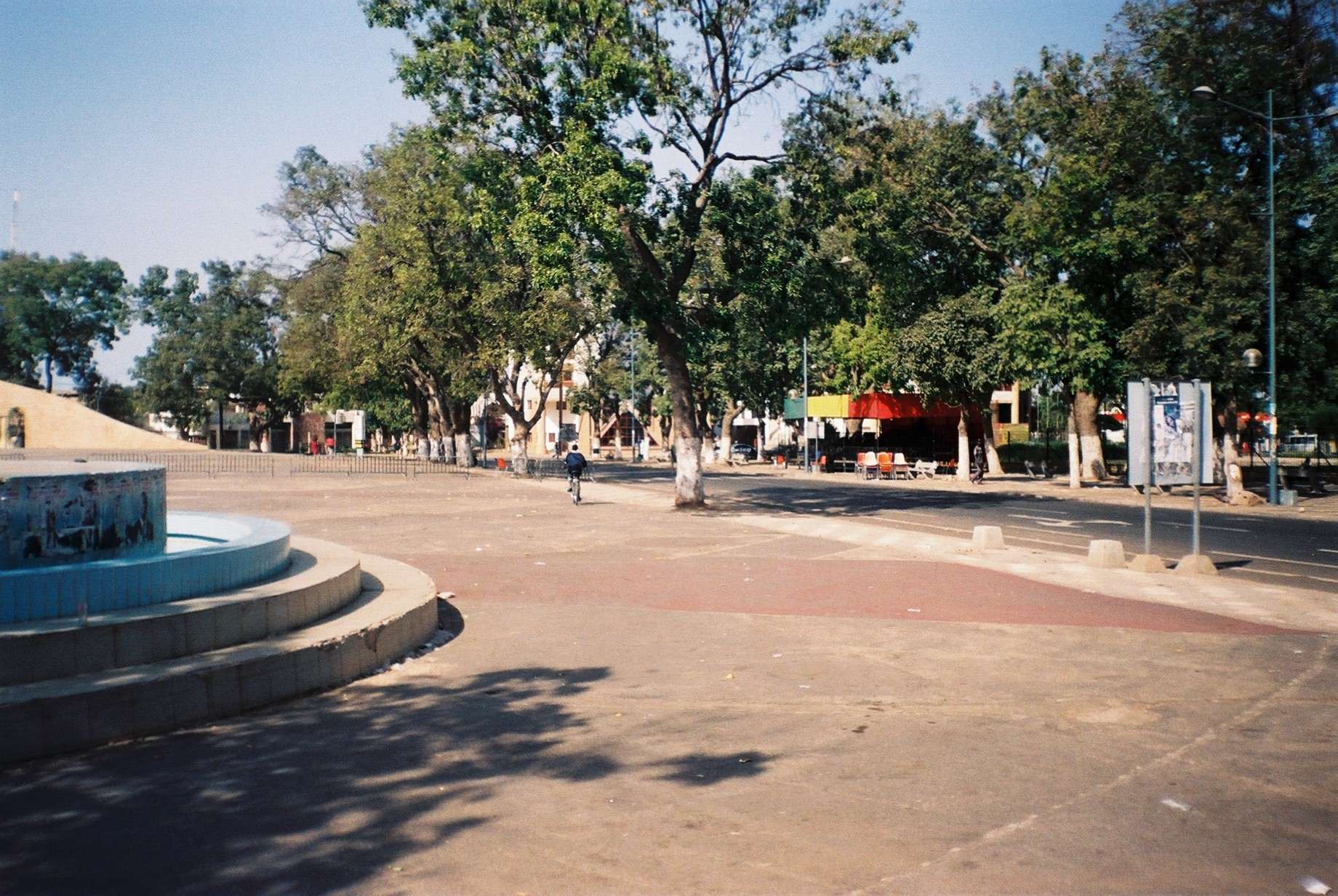
- Thiès; city centre

- Seal

- Location within Senegal Location within Africa
- Coordinates: 14°47′N 16°55′W
- Country: Senegal
- Region: Thiès Region

Government
  - Mayor: Babacar Diop

Population (2023 census)
  - Total: 391,253
- Time zone: UTC+0 (GMT)

Thiès ([tjɛs]; Noon: Chess; Arabic: ثيس, romanized: Ṯyass) is the third largest city in Senegal with a population of 391,253 in 2023. It lies 72 km (45 mi) east of Dakar on the N2 road and at the junction of railway lines to Dakar, Bamako and St-Louis. It is the capital of Thiès Region and is a major industrial city.

== History ==
Before colonization, the Thiès Plateau was a wooded frontier between the kingdoms of Cayor and Baol inhabited by the Serer-Noon, an ethnic sub-group of the Serer people. The Serer-Noon still inhabit the Thiès-Nones neighborhood of the south-west city today. They speak the Noon language, one of the Cangin languages.

The village of Dianxene, belonging to the kingdom of Cayor, was founded on the strategically important plateau in the 17th century. In 1860, it had only 75 inhabitants. The French founded a military post there in 1864, becoming an important force in the city's development ever since. The Spiritans founded a mission there in the late 19th century to help protect the local population from raids out of Mauretania seeking to capture slaves. In 1885, the Dakar–Saint-Louis railway, the first rail line in French West Africa, opened with a stop in Thiès.

The French colonial administration created the commune of Thiès in 1904. As an important railway junction, the city was an important site for labour activities, particularly in 1938 when a railway strike was violently repressed by France, and during the general strikes of 1945-1946 and 1947-1948. Léopold Sédar Senghor, later the first president of independent Senegal, was elected mayor of Thiès in November 1956.

== Transport ==
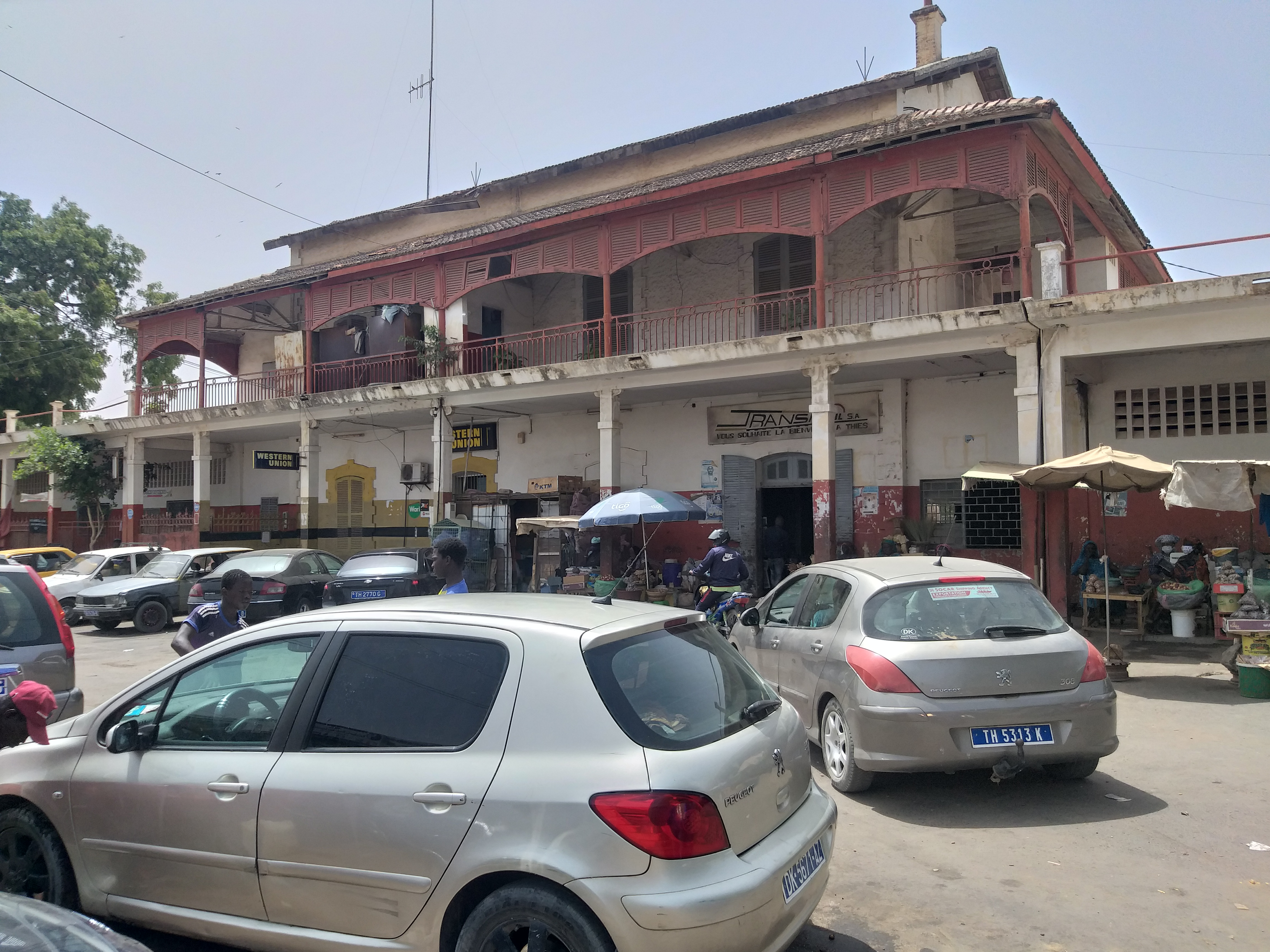
Rail station

At first a simple rail stop, or "escale", on the Dakar-Saint Louis line (completed in 1885) Thiès became a rail junction with the Dakar-Niger line (built 1906–1923). The national network of paved roads created after World War II likewise converged on Thiès (the N3 road joins the N2 road in the town), which thus commands nearly all access to the Cap-Vert Peninsula (Dakar and Rufisque).

The railways brought commercial development and migrant laborers, including Bambara from eastern regions of Senegal and from Mali. The rail workers of Thiès played a key role in the emergence of Senegal's labor movement. Their strikes in 1937 and again from 1947 to 1948 also marked the development of the independence movement across French West Africa.

== Economy ==
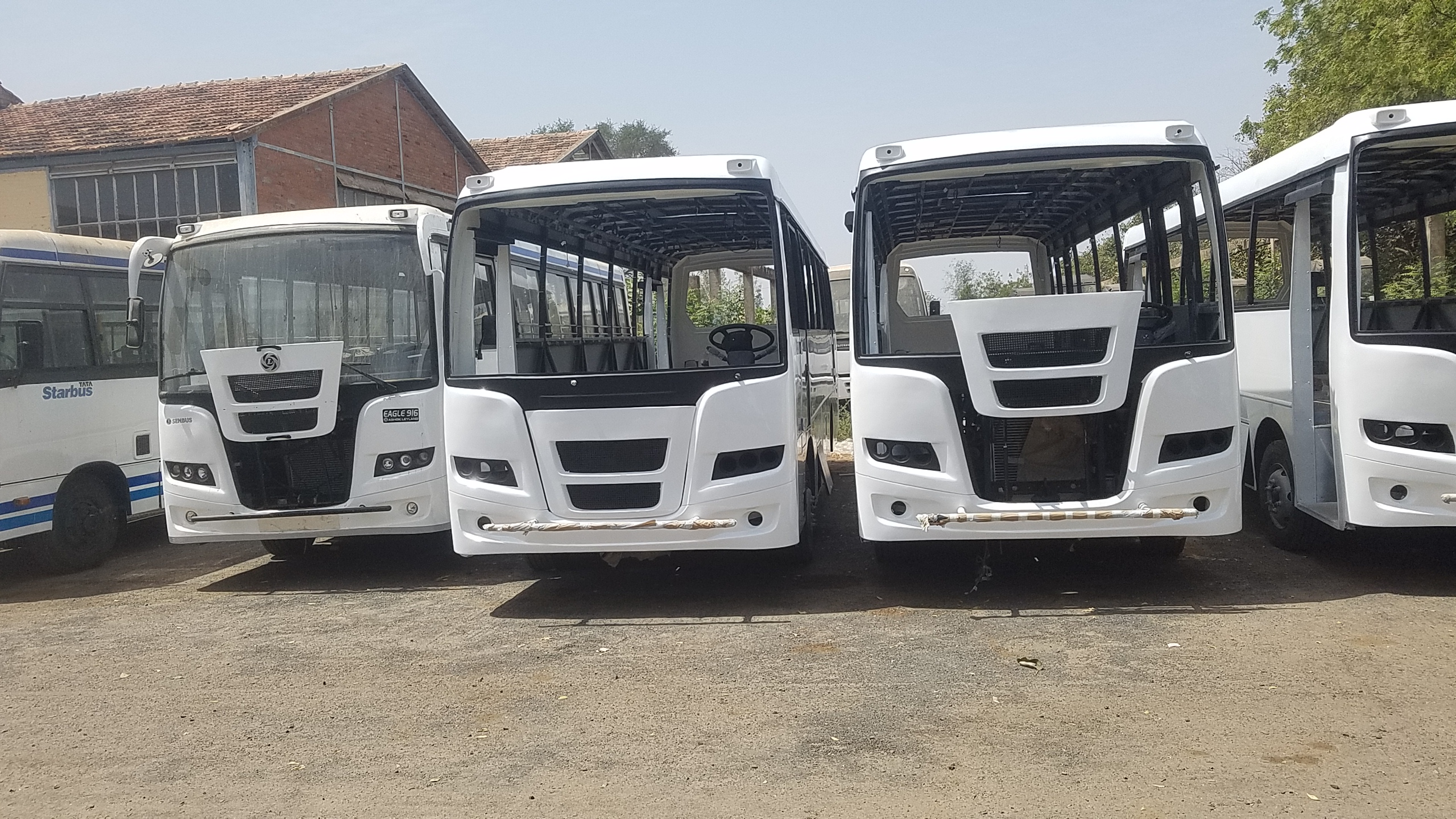
Senbus factory

Thiès is best known for its tapestry-making industry, an exclusive factory having been set up in 1966, producing work designed by Senegal's top artists. The famous Birds of Paradise tapestry was manufactured in Thiès. The city also contains a polytechnic school, the University of Thiès. In the 1960s, French truck manufacturer Berliet had a small assembly plant here.

Thiès is the transportation hub of a productive agricultural hinterland, producing rice, peanuts, manioc, millet, and fruit. The city is also a leading livestock-trading and meat-packing center. It has rail yards and repair shops, and aluminum phosphate deposits are worked at nearby Palo Dial and Taïba. The phosphate mined here is valuable as a fertiliser and is one of Senegal's largest exports.

Today, Thiès is developing increasingly as an extension of the congested Cap-Vert Peninsula. It is attracting industrial investments (electrical and mechanical engineering) and there are plans to link it to Dakar by highway and commuter train.

Other attractions in Thiès include a museum, an artisanal and crafts village and a few remains of old fortifications.

== Education ==
École Française Docteur René Guillet, a French international school, is located in Thiès. Malick Sy high school is the largest school in the city and one of the biggest of Senegal. Many Senegalese politicians were trained in this school which also produced many laureates of the Senegalese General Contest.

== International relations ==
=== Twin towns – sister cities ===
Thiès is twinned with:

- Caen, France
- Sousse, Tunisia
- Solingen, Germany

== Climate ==
Climate data for Thiès (1971–2000)
Month	Jan	Feb	Mar	Apr	May	Jun	Jul	Aug	Sep	Oct	Nov	Dec	Year
Mean daily maximum °C (°F)	31.5 (88.7)	31.7 (89.1)	33.2 (91.8)	32.6 (90.7)	32.5 (90.5)	33.1 (91.6)	31.6 (88.9)	30.5 (86.9)	31.1 (88.0)	32.5 (90.5)	33.5 (92.3)	31.1 (88.0)	32.1 (89.8)
Mean daily minimum °C (°F)	15.0 (59.0)	16.0 (60.8)	16.7 (62.1)	17.6 (63.7)	19.2 (66.6)	21.8 (71.2)	23.0 (73.4)	22.7 (72.9)	22.5 (72.5)	21.8 (71.2)	18.6 (65.5)	15.5 (59.9)	19.2 (66.6)
Average precipitation mm (inches)	1.0 (0.04)	0.0 (0.0)	0.0 (0.0)	0.0 (0.0)	0.0 (0.0)	22.0 (0.87)	90.0 (3.54)	193.0 (7.60)	148.0 (5.83)	31.0 (1.22)	3.0 (0.12)	1.0 (0.04)	489 (19.26)
Average relative humidity (%)	42	45	43	49	59	65	73	81	82	76	62	49	61
Source: FAO

== Notable residents ==
- Babacar Diop (born 1982), politician
- Maurice Ndour (born 1992), basketball player for Hapoel Jerusalem of the Israeli Basketball Premier League

== See also ==
- Railway stations in Senegal
