= 2019 Senegalese presidential election =

- 24 February 2019
- Turnout: 66.27%
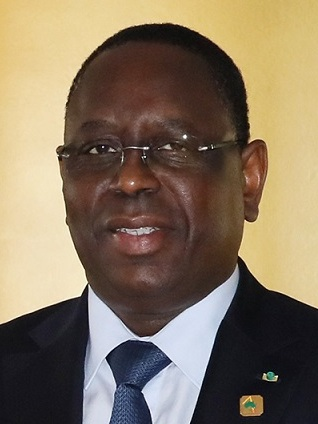

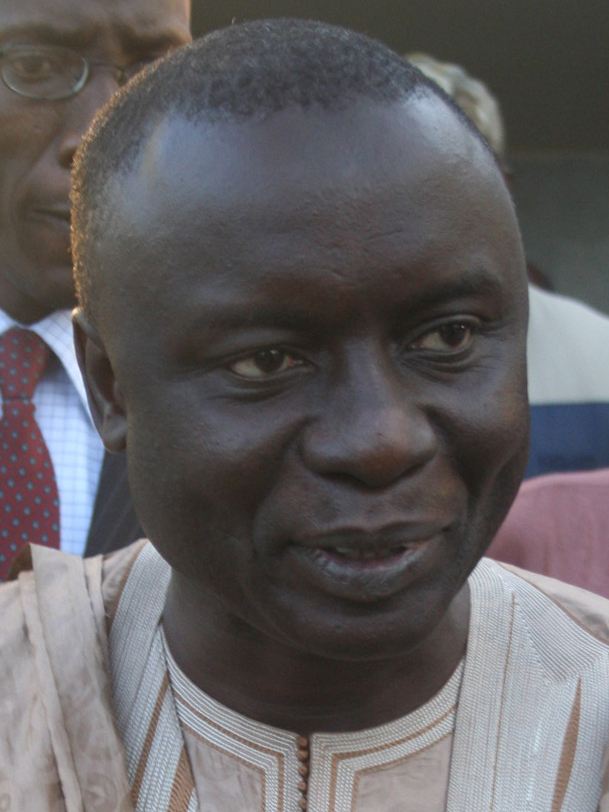

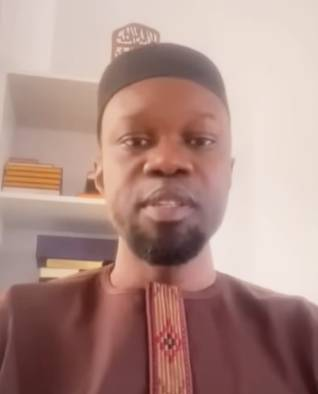
Candidate	Macky Sall	Idrissa Seck	Ousmane Sonko
Party	APR	Rewmi	PASTEF
Popular vote	2,555,426	899,556	687,523
Percentage	58.26%	20.51%	15.67%
- Results by department
President before election
Macky Sall
APR
Elected President
Macky Sall
APR

Presidential elections were held in Senegal on 24 February 2019. Incumbent president Macky Sall of the Alliance for the Republic was re-elected for a second term with 58% of the vote in the first round.

== Electoral system ==
The President of Senegal is elected using the two-round system; a candidate must receive over 50% of the vote to be elected in the first round. If no candidate had crossed the threshold, a second round would have been held between the top two candidates.

Prior to the elections, the electoral law was amended to introduce requirements for candidates to secure signatures from at least 0.8% of the registered electorate, and for at least 2,000 signatures from seven of the 14 regions. Voters were only allowed to give a signature to one candidate.

== Candidates ==
Although 87 candidates registered intent to collect signatures, only around 20 applied to the Constitutional Council to participate in the election, with the requirement for signatures and the introduction of a 30 million franc bond thought to have put many potential candidates off. Five candidates were approved to run in the elections; Madické Niang, Issa Sall, Macky Sall, Idrissa Seck and Ousmane Sonko.

In January 2019, two opposition leaders Khalifa Sall and Karim Wade were barred from participating due to previous convictions for misuse of public funds.

== Results ==
On 25 February 2019, Prime Minister Mahammed Dionne said that Sall had been re-elected with "a minimum of 57%" of the vote, enough to avoid a runoff election. He also said Sall had won in 13 of the country's 14 regions. On 5 March 2019, the Constitutional Council confirmed the election results.

Candidate	Party	Votes	%
Macky Sall	Alliance for the Republic	2,555,426	58.26
Idrissa Seck	Rewmi	899,556	20.51
Ousmane Sonko	PASTEF	687,523	15.67
Issa Sall	Party for Unity and Rally	178,613	4.07
Madické Niang	Independent	65,021	1.48
Total		4,386,139	100.00
Valid votes		4,386,139	99.04
Invalid/blank votes		42,541	0.96
Total votes		4,428,680	100.00
Registered voters/turnout		6,683,043	66.27
Source: Constitutional Council
