= Bassirou Diomaye Faye =

President of Senegal since 2024

His Excellency Bassirou Diomaye Faye
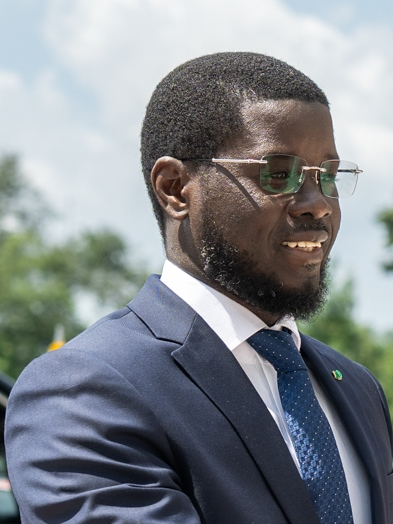
- Faye in 2025

5th President of Senegal
- Incumbent
- Assumed office 2 April 2024
- Prime Minister: Ousmane Sonko; Ahmadou Al Aminou Lo
- Preceded by: Macky Sall

General Secretary of PASTEF
- In office 15 October 2022 – 3 April 2024
- Leader: Ousmane Sonko
- Preceded by: Position established
- Succeeded by: Ayib Daffé

Personal details
- Born: Bassirou Diomaye Diakhar Faye; 25 March 1980 (age 46) Ndiaganiao, Senegal
- Party: Independent (2026–present)
- Other political affiliations: PASTEF (2024–2026)
- Spouse(s): Marie Khone Faye (m. 2009) Absa Faye (m. 2023)
- Children: 5
- Education: National School of Administration, Dakar; Cheikh Anta Diop University
- Occupation: Politician; tax official

Bassirou Diomaye Diakhar Faye (Note: Wolof: Basiiru Jomaay Jaxaar Fay) (born 25 March 1980), also known mononymously as Diomaye, is a Senegalese politician and former tax official who is serving as the fifth and current president of Senegal since 2024. He was previously the general secretary of PASTEF, and won the 2024 Senegalese presidential election in place of disqualified candidate Ousmane Sonko, whom he later appointed as prime minister.

== Early life ==
Faye was born on 25 March 1980 in Ndiaganiao, in the western department of M'bour, Senegal. He is a member of the Serer ethnic group from the noble Faye family. His middle name, "Diomaye", means "honourable" in Serer. Having had a traditional village upbringing, he has always claimed his rural origins, and "imbued himself with educational and social values typical of his land, Ndiaganiao, in Serer country".

His father, Samba Faye, a long-time member of the Socialist Party of Senegal, is quoted with saying that his son grew up with left-wing ideals. His grandfather fought for France during World War I as a Senegalese Tirailleur, and later was jailed following a dispute with French colonial authorities over his efforts to establish a district high school in Ndianganao which Faye later attended.

== Education and early career ==
He went to primary school in his village and then undertook middle and high school in M'Bour. In 2000, Faye earned his baccalaureate. He successfully attained a master's degree in law in Dakar's Cheikh Anta Diop University and subsequently cleared both competitive exams, enrolling at the National School of Administration of Senegal (ENA) and the magistracy in 2004. After graduation, Faye opted to become a tax official in the Tax and Estates department, where he befriended Ousmane Sonko, a fellow alumni from the same school. In 2014, Faye and Sonko's relationship grew closer in the Taxes and Estates Union, created by Sonko, the leader of the newly founded political party PASTEF. During his time at the head of the union, Faye campaigned to facilitate homeownership for tax and property agents.

== Political career ==
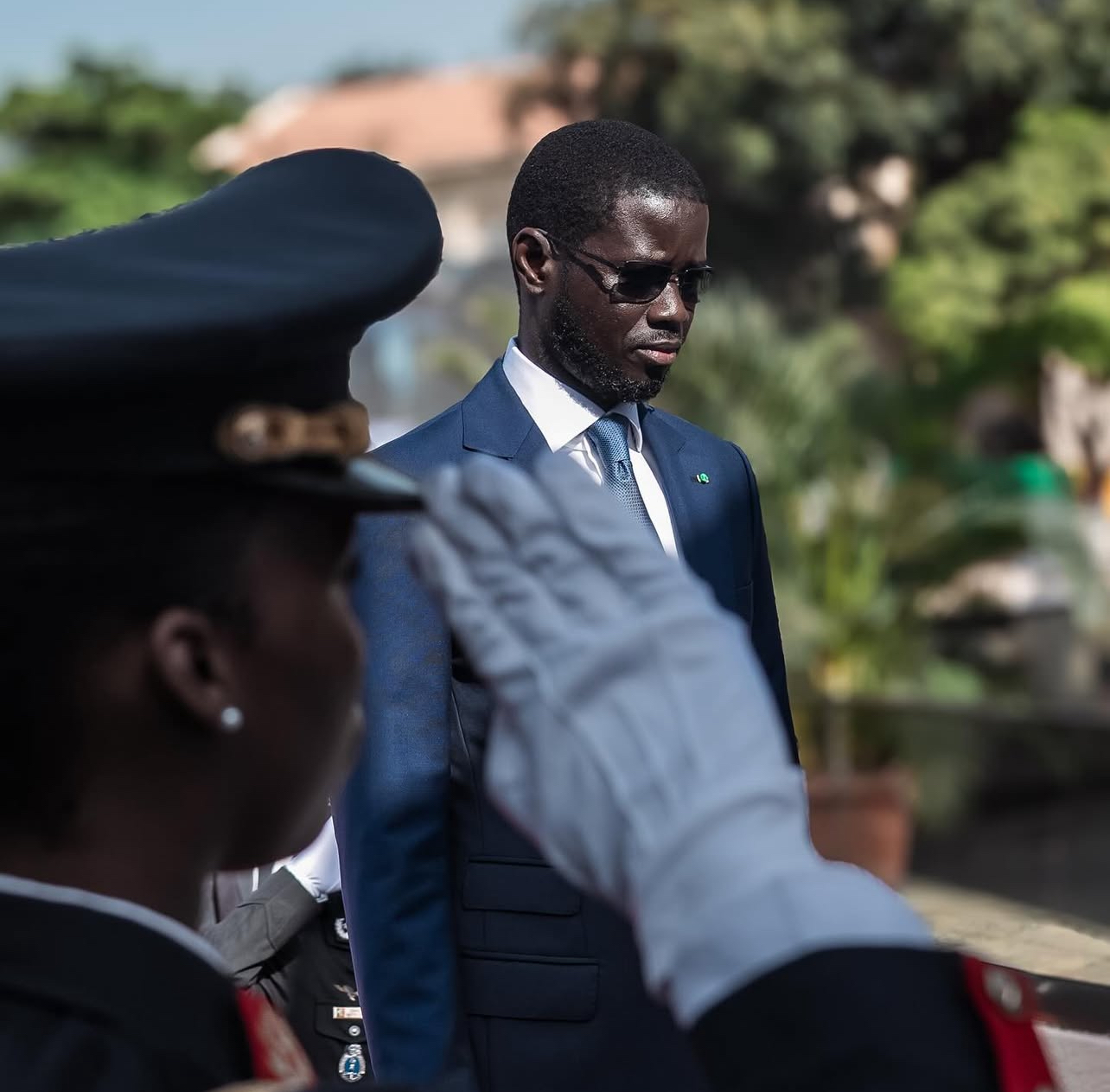
Faye in 2024

Initially a guest when PASTEF was founded, Faye swiftly ascended to become one of the most prominent figures within the party. He would go on to become one of the ideologues and designers of Sonko's program for his candidacy in the 2019 Senegalese presidential election. Sonko gained almost 16% of the vote and came third. In February 2021, Faye became the general secretary of PASTEF after Sonko was arrested, being accused of repeated rape by a massage parlor employee. As part of its strategy to win power, Faye attempted to unite the opposition for the 2022 elections, winning 56 seats under the alliance Liberate the People. At the same time, Faye ran unsuccessfully to become mayor of Ndianganao.

=== Imprisonment and release ===
On 14 April 2023, Faye was apprehended as he exited his tax and property office on Rue de Thiong in Dakar. Subsequently, he was placed under police custody for charges including "spreading false news, contempt of court, and defamation of a constituted body" following a social media post he made. In this post, he denounced the perceived injustice within the judicial system, foreseeing a verdict that could potentially disqualify Sonko in a legal dispute between PASTEF and the Minister of Tourism, Mame Mbaye Niang. As the situation progressed, additional charges of "incitement to insurrection" and "undermining state security" were brought against him, resulting in an indefinite period of detention.

After an attempt by incumbent president Macky Sall in February 2024 to postpone the elections, citing unresolved disputes over who could run, widespread protests erupted and the Constitutional Council of Senegal overturned the postponement. In response to the protests and overturning, Sall said that he would leave office as scheduled on 2 April, setting the election date on 24 March. He also expressed his willingness to release Sonko, Faye and all their supporters as an act of good faith. At the end of February, the government tabled an amnesty bill to calm the social and political unrest. Several hundred political prisoners were released by the government, and on 14 March, days before the election, Sonko and Faye were both released from prison.

=== Presidential campaign ===
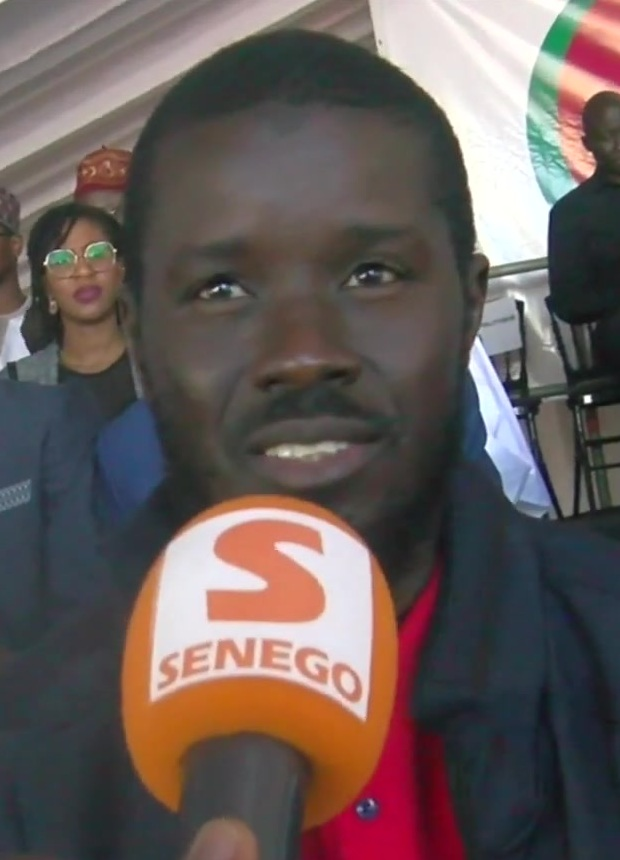
Faye in 2023

After uncertainty over the possibility of Sonko being a candidate in the presidential election, PASTEF endorsed Faye in November 2023 as its candidate for the 2024 presidential election, despite him being detained. However, PASTEF had been banned several months earlier, meaning he was running as an independent. On 20 January 2024, the Senegalese Constitutional Council published the final list of candidates for the presidential election and Sonko did not appear there after several legal battles. Faye's candidacy was validated because he was never convicted although remaining detained. Sonko quickly announced his support to Faye for the election.

On 15 March 2024, a day after Faye's release from jail, he gathered hundreds of supporters at his first public appearance as a presidential contender. Former president Abdoulaye Wade and his Senegalese Democratic Party (PDS) endorsed Faye on the same day, in a boost to his chances of winning election. The move came after PDS candidate Karim Wade was disqualified from contesting the race because he was a dual citizen at the time he submitted his candidacy. Cheikh Tidiane Dieye, another candidate in the presidential election, withdrew in favor of Faye.

During the presidential campaign, he promised to create jobs, campaigned strongly against corruption, and vowed to reexamine energy contracts. He ran under the slogan "Diomaye mooy Sonko", which means "Diomaye is Sonko" in Wolof, and expressed hope that Sonko's charisma and popular appeal among Senegal's youth would boost his campaign. Faye's program was similar with Sonko's for 2019. During the campaign, Faye released a declaration of his assets and called on other candidates to follow suit.

Faye was elected president after an election campaign that was marred by an attempt by the government to postpone the election, which was ultimately held on 24 March. Faye received over 54% of the vote, making him the first opposition candidate to have won an election in the first round since Senegal's independence in 1960.

== Presidency (2024–present) ==
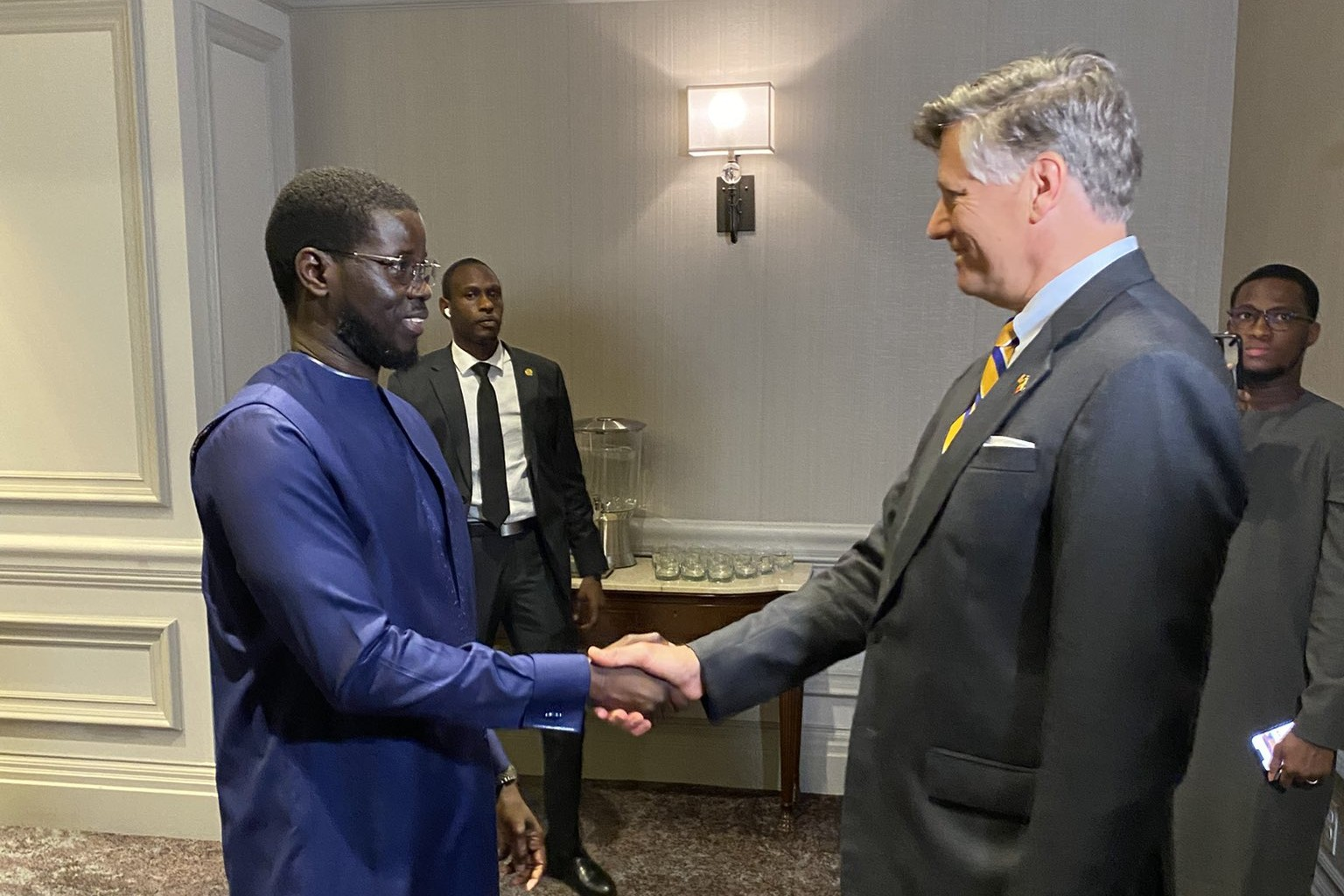
Faye with U.S. Deputy Secretary of State Christopher Landau in July 2025.

Faye was formally inaugurated as president on 2 April. In his inaugural address, he pledged to fight corruption and reform the economy. His first official act was to appoint Sonko as Prime Minister of Senegal, who formally presented his government on 5 April.

The Faye administration has seen some recovery from democratic backsliding that took place under Macky Sall. In 2025, Thomas Carothers and McKenzie Carrier at the Carnegie Endowment for International Peace wrote that "a fundamental shift under Faye's presidency has been the departure from the illiberal stance of his predecessor relating to basic [political] freedoms". However, Faye's administration has been marked by pressure on the news media, including censorship.

On 3 April, Faye ordered an audit of the mining, oil, and gas sector, but insisted that investors were "welcome in Senegal."

On 25 April, Faye made his first foreign visit as president to Mauritania, where he met with President Mohamed Ould Ghazouani in Nouakchott. On 25 May he met with Guinea's military leader Mamady Doumbouya during his visit to the latter country. On 30 May, he met with Assimi Goita, the leader of the ruling junta of Mali during a visit to Bamako. Faye had previously expressed his intention to bring back Mali, as well as the military-ruled states of Burkina Faso and Niger to ECOWAS.

On 12 September, Faye dissolved the National Assembly and ordered snap elections for the chamber on 17 November. He had previously been in conflict with the legislature and accused the latter of blocking his proposed reforms and budget. PASTEF won the elections by a landslide.

Faye was invited to the White House for a meeting between President Donald Trump and various African leaders in July 2025. During the meeting, Faye praised Trump for his ability at solving crises and his golf skills, and reassured American investors of Senegal's political stability.

In May 2026, Faye publicly fell out with Ousmane Sonko and dismissed him as prime minister, following a debt crisis and stalled negotiations with the International Monetary Fund. Economist Ahmadou Al Aminou Lo was subsequently appointed prime minister.

== Political positions ==
Faye says he believes in system change and left-wing pan-Africanism to reclaim Senegal's sovereignty, which some analysts believe is an allusion to intentions to distance the country away from Western powers, especially from the former French colonial empire. He also vowed to fight "French economic stranglehold" over Senegal if elected.

=== Constitutional reforms ===
Faye has promised to reduce presidential powers and reintroduce the vice presidency.

=== Anti-corruption ===
Faye has claimed to prioritise fighting political corruption if he is elected president, saying: "No country can develop when corruption and embezzlement of public funds are endemic."

=== Currency ===
Faye intends to stop the circulation of the CFA franc in Senegal, remove it as its official currency, and create a new national currency. His program states: "We will carry out a monetary reform that will allow our country to have its own currency." In a press conference, he added: "There's no sovereignty if there is no monetary sovereignty." After concern from foreign investors, in March 2023 he said that "Senegal will seek to implement a reform of the CFA franc at a regional level first and if that fails, will consider creating a national currency."

=== Energy ===
Faye believes in the renegotiation of contracts between the government and corporations in sectors ranging from energy to mining and fishing. He has also pledged to equally distribute profits out of a gas field that is expected to start production in 2024.

=== ECOWAS ===
Faye wants to keep Mali, Niger, and Burkina Faso in ECOWAS, all while recognizing the Alliance of Sahel States, in response to the security context in the said countries.

=== Military ===
Faye aims to enhance the reputation and integrity of the defense and security forces through a concerted effort to combat corruption and inefficiency. This initiative seeks to ensure the optimal use of resources by implementing programs aimed at boosting the morale, motivation, and oversight of officers. Additionally, there's a commitment to raise the salaries of lower-ranking personnel. His program pledges to uphold the core identity of the Armed Forces of Senegal by advocating for a return to military principles, preventing their involvement in political affairs. Furthermore, the plan includes bolstering the air capabilities of the army through the procurement of strategic transport aircraft, such as the C-130, to fulfill external commitments effectively.

=== Judiciary ===
Faye believes in the separation of powers, so that there should be no ties between the executive and the judiciary. His plan involves transitioning from the Senegalese Constitutional Council to a constitutional court, positioning it as the apex of the judicial structure. Additionally, in a bid to enhance accountability and fortify oversight mechanisms, he proposes abolishing political funds and substituting them with special funds allocated by the National Assembly for critical operations, such as arms procurement and clandestine missions. Furthermore, legislation will be introduced to safeguard whistleblowers, aligning with the principles outlined in the law on transparency in finance management in the public sector.

=== Language ===
Faye has pledged to have indigenous languages of Senegal used as the primary language of instruction in schools. Since becoming president, he has had his official speeches delivered in Wolof and French.

=== Decolonisation efforts ===
Faye is in favor of renaming certain roadways bearing names from the French colonial era in honor of "national heroes".

=== Casamance conflict ===
Under Faye's presidency, a new peace agreement was reached in Bissau on 25 February 2025 with the Movement of Democratic Forces of Casamance (MFDC) to end the Casamance conflict following talks hosted and mediated by Guinea-Bissau. Similar to a previous deal by Sall's government in 2022, the agreement was signed between the Senegalese government and the MFDC's Badiatte faction, with the latter again agreeing to disarm. In contrast, the MFDC's Sadio faction did not agree to the deal.

=== LGBTQ+ rights ===
On the 31st of March 2026, Faye followed through on a campaign promise by promulgating a law increasing the penalty for homosexuality from a minimum of 1 year and a maximum of 5 years to a minimum of 5 years and a maximum of 10 years in prison, and increased the fine to 10 million CFA francs. The law also rendered illegal the "promotion" of homosexuality.

== Personal life ==
Faye is polygamous and has two wives: Marie Khone Faye and Absa Faye. Marie Khone is a close relative of her husband, and together they have had four children: three boys and one girl. He has a child (a girl) with Absa. Faye married Marie in 2009 and Absa in 2023. He has named one of his sons after Ousmane Sonko, in honor of their close friendship. He also has a sister.

According to his declaration of assets that he released during his presidential campaign in 2024, Faye possesses a house in Dakar, as well as land outside the capital and in Ndiaganiao.

== Honours ==
=== National Honours ===
- Senegal:
  - Grand Master (and Grand Cross) of the National Order of the Lion
  - Grand Master (and Grand Cross) of the National Order of Merit

=== Foreign Honours ===
- Guinea Bissau:
  - Recipient of the Medal of Amílcar Cabral (27 May 2025)

== See also ==
- List of current heads of state and government
- List of heads of the executive by approval rating

== Notes ==
Political offices
Preceded by Macky Sall	President of Senegal; 2024–present	Incumbent
