= Ousmane Sonko =

President of the National Assembly of Senegal since 2026

His Excellency Ousmane Sonko
- Usmaan Sonko
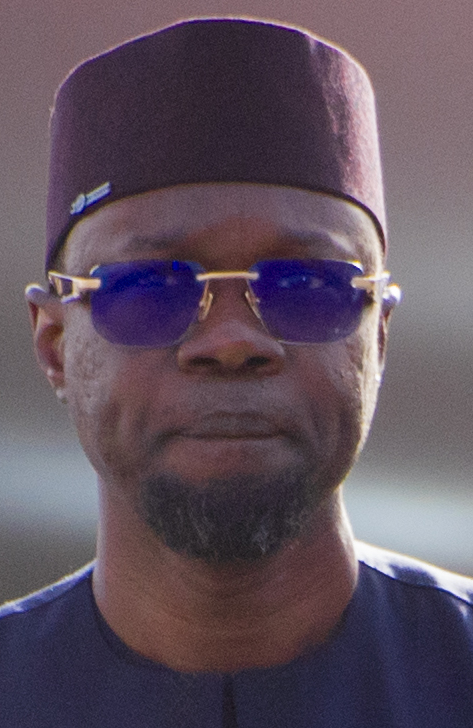
- Sonko in 2026

President of the National Assembly
- Incumbent
- Assumed office 26 May 2026
- Preceded by: Malick Ndiaye

16th Prime Minister of Senegal
- In office 3 April 2024 – 22 May 2026
- President: Bassirou Diomaye Faye
- Preceded by: Sidiki Kaba
- Succeeded by: Ahmadou Al Aminou Lo

Mayor of Ziguinchor
- In office 10 February 2022 – 6 May 2024
- Preceded by: Abdoulaye Baldé
- Succeeded by: Djibril Sonko

Leader of PASTEF
- Incumbent
- Assumed office January 2014
- General Secretary: Bassirou Diomaye Faye; Ayib Daffé
- Preceded by: Party established

Member of the National Assembly of Senegal
- Incumbent
- Assumed office 26 May 2026
- In office 14 September 2017 – 12 September 2022

Personal details
- Born: 15 July 1974 (age 52) Thiès, Senegal
- Party: PASTEF (2014–present)
- Children: 6
- Education: Gaston Berger University
- Occupation: Politician; tax official

Ousmane Sonko (Wolof: Usmaan Sonko; born 15 July 1974) is a Senegalese politician and former tax official who served as the 16th prime minister of Senegal from 2024 to 2026, and as the leader of PASTEF since the party's foundation in January 2014.

Sonko was the PASTEF candidate in the 2019 presidential election, ultimately placing third. A major figure in the Senegalese opposition against former president Macky Sall, his arrest and subsequent investigation by authorities in 2019 following sexual assault accusations triggered mass protests and rioting across Senegal. In June 2023, he was sentenced to two years in prison, and in July 2023, PASTEF was dissolved by the Senegalese government. In 2024, he was appointed prime minister after his protégé, Bassirou Diomaye Faye, won the 2024 presidential election. Faye dismissed Sonko in May 2026.

== Early life ==
Sonko was born in Thiès and spent his childhood in Sébikhotane and Casamance. His father was from Casamance and his mother was from Khombole.

Sonko received his baccalaureate in the year 1993, and graduated with a master's degree in Juridical Science from Gaston Berger University in Saint-Louis in 1999. He subsequently attended the National School of Administration and the Judiciary.

Prior to entering politics, Sonko worked for 15 years as a tax official in Pikine. In 2016, he acted as a whistle blower, exposing the use of offshore tax havens including a $50 million mineral sands processing plants used by a Canadian company to avoid paying $8.9 million in taxes. Sonko's employment as a tax official was terminated as a result of his whistleblowing. In 2018, he published Pétrole et gaz au Sénégal, a non-fiction book chronicling his findings.

== Political career ==
In 2014, Sonko was chosen to be the leader of the African Patriots of Senegal for Work, Ethics and Fraternity (French: Patriotes africains du Sénégal pour le travail, l'éthique et la fraternité, PASTEF). Between 2017 and 2022, he served as a member of the National Assembly.

In 2018, Sonko published Solutions, a book in which he put forward his political manifesto. He was a candidate in the 2019 presidential election, where he called for Senegal to replace the franc with a domestic currency. In the election, Macky Sall was re-elected, with Sonko placing third with 16% of the vote. During the lead up to the election, Sonko reported being targeted with anonymous smears aimed at discrediting his character.

In September 2021, Sonko launched the coalition "Free the People" (Wolof: Yewwi askan wi) with the aim of gaining seats in municipal and departmental councils controlled by parties within Macky's presidential coalition, United in Hope. During the 2022 local elections, Sonko was elected as Mayor of Ziguinchor. His coalition also managed to gain control of local councils from United in Hope, notably in Dakar, in addition to 56 of the 165 parliamentary seats in the National Assembly.

=== 2021 arrest ===
In February 2021, an employee of a massage parlour filed a complaint against Sonko for "repetitive rape and death threats". On 3 March 2021, Sonko was arrested near Cheikh Anta Diop University and charged with disturbing public order; Sonko called the charges false and politically motivated. Sonko's arrest led to protests; clashes between the police and student protestors in Dakar, Bignona and Diaobe led to 14 reported deaths. Protests against Sonko's detainment also occurred internationally, with one outside the United Nations headquarters in New York City, United States, calling for Sonko's release from prison.

Alioune Badara Cissé called on the Senegalese government to stop threatening and intimidating protestors, and also called upon demonstrators to end its violence and looting, warning that Senegal was "on the verge of an apocalypse". The Economic Community of West African States similarly called for restraint and calm, as well as for the government to guarantee citizens the right to protest.

In February 2021, MPs voted by majority to remove Sonko's parliamentary immunity in a vote which was described as "flawed and illegal" by opposition politicians. Sonko was released under investigation; in May 2021, a judge denied to authorise him leaving the country due to his indictment for rape.

=== Criminal convictions ===
On 8 May 2023, following an appeal, Sonko received a six-month suspended prison sentence for defamation and insults against Mame Mbaye Niang.

On 1 June 2023, following two years of investigations, Sonko was cleared of rape charges, but was sentenced to two years imprisonment for "corrupting youth". Sonko had not attended the trial, calling the investigation politically motivated and evidence of malpractice. His conviction made Sonko ineligible to stand as a candidate in the 2024 presidential election, which prompted protests to occur throughout Senegal. Some supporters of Sonko have stated that due to "corrupting youth" being considered a misdemeanour rather than a crime under Senegal law, that Sonko was still able to run; in July 2023, he was named as PASTEF's presidential candidate for the 2024 presidential election.

=== 2023 arrest and protests ===
On 28 July 2023, Sonko was arrested again and accused of "disturbing the public order". On 31 July 2023, PASTEF was dissolved by the Senegalese government, triggering national protests. On 6 August 2023, Sonko was reportedly hospitalised following a week-long hunger strike in protest of his arrest. The Senegalese government banned TikTok from the country in August, until it provides a way for the government to censor users who "threaten the stability of the country" by protesting Sonko's arrest. In October 2023, the Ziguinchor court annulled the removal of Ousmane Sonko from the electoral lists. A decision contested by state lawyers, they announced an appeal to the Supreme Court. On 14 December 2023, the verdict in the new trial on the eligibility of Sonko was rendered and Sonko was declared eligible and reinstated on the electoral lists. On 15 March 2024, Sonko was released from prison.

== Prime Minister (2024–2026) ==
Following the victory of his protégé, Bassirou Diomaye Faye, in the 2024 Senegalese presidential election, Sonko was appointed as Prime Minister of Senegal shortly after Faye's inauguration as president on 2 April 2024. Sonko formally presented his government on 5 April, which he described as a "breakaway" government symbolising "a systemic transformation voted for by the Senegalese people".

During his premiership, Sonko has criticised the French military presence in Senegal, as well as Western efforts to promote values deemed incompatible with Senegalese and African mores, including LGBT rights and monogamy. He has also called for a reform of ECOWAS for allowing divisions within the bloc to develop, which had led to the creation of the Alliance of Sahel States.

In September 2024, Sonko announced that a review of government finances under Macky Sall's presidency had found “widespread corruption” and manipulation of numbers in financial affairs, prompting Sonko to pledge further investigations.

On 25 February 2025, Sonko claimed that he had reached an agreement with the Movement of Democratic Forces of Casamance (MFDC) to end the Casamance conflict following talks hosted and mediated by Guinea-Bissau. Similar to a previous deal in 2022, the agreement was signed between the Senegalese government and the MFDC's Badiatte faction, with latter again agreeing to disarm. In contrast, the MFDC's Sadio faction did not agree to the deal.

In May 2025, Sonko stated that the CFA Franc, whatever its new definition, poses both a symbolic and economic problem.

In July 2025, Sonko denounced the lack of authority in Senegal, by the state itself, alluding to President Faye.

On 22 May 2026, he was dismissed from his position as Prime Minister by presidential decree. The deterioration of relations with President Faye seems to have resulted from diverging views regarding the country's debt, requests from the International Monetary Fund, and mining and oil rights. Sonko has maintained a confronting stance against foreign economic interest, whilst Faye has shown more willingness to second them. His dismissal came hours after Sonko accused "the tyrannical West" of trying to "impose homosexuality on the rest of the world", following the passage of a new anti LGBTQ+ law which toughened sentences for people convicted of same-sex relations. Before the dismissal the relationship between him and President Faye had soured. On 25 May, Sonko was elected as speaker of the National Assembly.

Political offices
Preceded by Sidiki Kaba	Prime Minister of Senegal; 2024–2026	Succeeded by Ahmadou Al Aminou Lo
