= Yoro Dyao =

Senegambian historian and noble

Yoro Boly Dyao, Yoro Boly Jaw, or Yoro Booli Jaw (born in Xumma, Waalo, c. 1847 - April 3, 1919) was a Wolof historian, author, noble, and scion of Senegambia, in northern Senegal. He was the son of Fara Penda, who was a Waalo noble, as well as a direct descendant of Laman Jaw, who was the king of the Jolof in 1285. Yoro was in command of the canton of Foss-Galodjina and was set over Wâlo (Ouâlo) by Louis Faidherbe, where he served as a chief from 1861 to 1914.

== Biography ==
Dyao graduated in 1860 as one of the earliest graduates of Governor Faidherbe's Ecole des Otages, which was founded in 1855. He was one of many West African authors during the colonial era who wrote chronicles on the history (e.g., Wolof history) and culture of the people (e.g., Wolof) of Senegal, to have their works translated by Maurice Delafosse, Octave Houdas, and Henri Gaden. His Histoire des Damels de Cayor was published in Moniteur du Senegal (1864).

Among the people interviewed and works reviewed by Eunice A. Charles, Dyao's account of the Jolof Empire, published in Legendes et Coutumes Senegalaises, cahiers de Yoro Dyao, known in English as Senegalese legends and customs: notebooks of Yoro Dyâo, was regarded as the most detailed. It was also regarded as a valuable and remarkable contribution to Revue d'Ethnographie et de Sociologie. Dyao's notebooks detail indigenous Senegalese philosophy, life, and tradition, as well as the basic elements of Wolof society and institutions, such as the family structure, the caste system, and degrees of nobility. For instance, his work described griots, who, within the social hierarchy of artisans (nyeenyo), there were musicians (sab-lekk), drummers (tamakat), and xalmbaan, who used violin-like instruments to play their music. The works of Dyao also detailed the Ndyadyane Ndyaye legend, the Jolof Empire's founding, and the inauguration of kings in Senegal. His works highlighted the existence of a customary belief that supernatural forces reconstitute the Jolof Empire under the Buurba as well as indicated that the normal growth and development of planted anointed seeds were regarded as key to the prosperity of the Jolof Empire.

Senegalese historian, Boubacar Lam, a disciple of Cheikh Anta Diop, also encountered the compiled and collected work of Yoro Dyao, such as his works on migrations from the Nile Valley to West Africa. Yoro Dyao indicated that there was a widespread oral tradition among the peoples of Senegal and Senegambia: "The general opinion in all of Senegambia being that our country owes its peopling to migrations out of Egypt, from which descend all of its population." In Chronicles of Senegalese Foùta, Dyao gave account of six population migrations from Egypt to Senegambia:

- In the first migration, composed of the Dya'go, Dyao highlighted that they migrated out of Egypt armed with metal (hogo) assegais, sabers, daggers, and knives, bringing along with them armor, as well as their industrious wisdom of metallurgy; they inaugurated the sorghum culture to prevent flooding from the Senegal River; the migration took place under the King of Egypt, identified as "Pate Lamine"; the words, whether used separately or together, are used among the Mandinka, the Peuls, the Khassonké, the Sarakhollé, and to some extent, among the Wolof.
- In the second migration, composed of the Manna (named after their chief leader), which was caused by the vexations of the King of Egypt, Sossé Touré, Dyao notes that they were much more numerous than the Dya'go; they sojourned through the desert, settled near the Senegal River, and peopled Fouta; as they seized political power from the Galos, their leaders bore the title of Fari (Emperor), which is used among the Wolof and Peul. The Bambara, Malinké, Soninké, and Khassonké are also said to have come along with this migration.
- In the third migration, composed of the Tondyon people, Dyao made note of their migration being more important than the Dya'go and Manna migrations, as they had seized the titles and rights to rule from the Fari and bestowed it upon their leaders, the Farang; Farang was a title used for their rulers, as well as the King of Egypt, who caused them to expatriate due to the continuous menial tasks they were being commanded to perform; as part of an extended Farang Empire, some of the migrants settled near the Senegal River, in the Sokhotoro, Kindila, Gangari, and Tambo-Dougoura, and became known as Soninké. The Bambara, Malinké, and Khassonké are also said to have come along with this migration.
- In the fourth and fifth migrations, composed of Tourmiss and Koli-Tenguella, respectively, which was caused due to the excessive demands of the Farang of Egypt, it was noted by Dyao as being comparatively smaller than the Dya'go, Manna, and Tondyon migrations; while partly composed of Soninké, Bambara, Malinké, Khassonké, and other Manding, these migrations were largely composed of Fulani, to which the leader, Tourmiss, belonged, and ultimately, resulted in the spread of the Fulani throughout the six countries of Senegambia.
- In the sixth migration, composed of the Turi-Siny, or Lam-Toro (also the title of its leader), Moussa departed with some of the group he would travel with, from Tripi Sing, near Mecca, and others from the group in Egypt; he arrived as a cavalry in Senegal, overthrew Ymido, defeated the Kalimou quarter, and proclaimed himself king, which led to subsequent migrations and state formations in the region.

== Selected works ==
- Cahiers de Yoro Dyâo
- Légendes et coutumes sénégalaises : cahiers de Yoro Dyâo
- Légendes et coutumes sénégalaises, Revue d'ethnographie et de sociologie
- Légendes et coutumes sénégalaises. Cahiers de Yoro Dyao : publiés et commentés par Henri Gaden
