= Senegal =

Country in West Africa

Republic of Senegal République du Sénégal (French)
- Flag Coat of arms
- Motto: "Un peuple, un but, une foi" (French) "Benn Askan, Benn Jubluwaay, Benn Pas-Pas" (Wolof) (English: "One People, One Goal, One Faith")
- Anthem: Le Lion rouge (English: "The Red Lion")
- Location of Senegal (dark green)
- Capital and largest city: Dakar; 14°40′N 17°25′W
- Official languages: French
- National languages: Wolof (Note: Information from the University of Pennsylvania's Center for African Studies estimates that about 90% of the Senegalese population understands or speaks Wolof as a first or second language.); Serer; Diola; Pulaar; Soninke; Mandinka (Note: Article 1 of the 2001 Constitution of Senegal, which states that the national languages are Diola, Malinké, Pular, Sérère, Soninké and Wolof.)
- Ethnic groups (2019): 39.7% Wolof; 27.5% Fula; 16.0% Serer; 4.9% Mandinka; 4.2% Jola; 2.4% Soninke; 5.4% others
- Religion (2025): 91% Islam; 5% Christianity; 3.5% Traditional faiths; 0.5% Others
- Demonym: Senegalese
- Government: Unitary semi-presidential republic
  - President: Bassirou Diomaye Faye
  - Prime Minister: Ahmadou Al Aminou Lo
  - President of the National Assembly: Ousmane Sonko
- Legislature: National Assembly

Independence
  - Republic established: 25 November 1958
  - Independence from France (Note: With French Sudan, as the Mali Federation.): 20 June 1960
  - Withdrawal from the Mali Federation: 20 August 1960
  - Dissolution of the Senegambia Confederation: 30 September 1989

Area
  - Total: 196,722 km^{2} (75,955 sq mi) (86th)
  - Water (%): 2.1

Population
  - 2024 estimate: ▲18,847,519 (68th)
  - Density: 96/km^{2} (248.6/sq mi)
- GDP (PPP): 2025 estimate
  - Total: ▲$105.428 billion (100th)
  - Per capita: ▲$5,498 (150th)
- GDP (nominal): 2025 estimate
  - Total: ▲$34.728 billion (103rd)
  - Per capita: ▲$1,811 (154th)
- Gini (2021): ▼36.2 medium inequality
- HDI (2023): ▲0.530 low (169th)
- Currency: West African CFA franc (XOF)
- Time zone: UTC±00:00 (GMT)
- Calling code: +221
- ISO 3166 code: SN
- Internet TLD: .sn

Senegal, (Note: /ˌsɛnəˈɡɔːl, -ˈɡɑːl/; French: Sénégal [seneɡal]) officially the Republic of Senegal, (Note: French: République du Sénégal [ʁepyblik dy seneɡal]) is the westernmost country of mainland West Africa, situated along the Atlantic Ocean coast. It borders Mauritania to the north, Mali to the east, Guinea to the southeast and Guinea-Bissau to the southwest. Senegal nearly surrounds the Gambia, a country occupying a narrow strip of land along the banks of the Gambia River, which separates Senegal's southern region of Casamance from the rest of the country. It also shares a maritime border with Cape Verde. The capital and largest city of Senegal is Dakar.

Senegal is the westernmost country in the mainland of the Old World and Afro-Eurasia. It owes its name to the Senegal River, which borders it to the north and east. The climate is typically Sahelian, with a rainy season. Senegal covers a land area of almost 197,000 square kilometres (76,000 sq mi) and has a population of around 18 million. The state is a semi-presidential republic; since its foundation in 1960, it has been recognized as one of the most stable countries on the African continent. On the 2024 V-Dem Democracy Indices, Senegal is ranked 68th in electoral democracy worldwide and 10th in electoral democracy in Africa.

The state was formed as part of the independence of French West Africa from French colonial rule. Because of this history, French is the official language, but it is understood by only a small minority of the population. Over 30 languages are spoken; Wolof is the most widely spoken, with 80% of the population speaking it as a first or second language, acting as the lingua franca alongside French. Arabic and Pulaar are popular among certain communities. Like other African nations, the country includes a wide mix of ethnic and linguistic communities, with the largest being the Wolof, Fula, and Serer people. Senegalese people are predominantly Muslim.

As a developing nation, Senegal is classified as a heavily indebted poor country, with a relatively low ranking on the Human Development Index (169th out of 193). Most of the population lives on the coast and works in agriculture or other food industries; other major industries include mining, tourism, and services. The historic lack of natural resources has directed efforts towards increasing literacy and educational attainment. Senegal is a member state of the African Union, the United Nations, the Economic Community of West African States (ECOWAS), Organisation internationale de la Francophonie, the Organisation of Islamic Cooperation, and the Community of Sahel–Saharan States.

== Etymology ==
The country is named after the Senegal River. The name of the river may derive from a Portuguese transliteration of the name of the Zenaga, also known as the Sanhaja. Alternatively, it could be a combination of the supreme deity in Serer religion (Rog Sene) and o gal, meaning ‘body of water’ in the Serer language. French author and priest David Boilat proposes that the name comes from the Wolof phrase "sunuu gaal", which means "our canoe".

== History ==
=== Early and pre-colonial eras ===
Archaeological findings indicate that Senegal was inhabited in prehistoric times and has been continuously occupied by various ethnic groups. Some kingdoms were created between the 6th and 14th centuries AD, such as Takrur in the 6th century, Namandiru, and the Jolof Empire in the 13th and 14th centuries. Eastern Senegal was once part of the Ghana Empire.

Islam was introduced by the Toucouleur and Soninke through their contact with the Almoravid dynasty of the Maghreb, who helped spread it with their Toucouleur allies. This movement faced resistance from ethnicities of traditional religions, the Serers in particular.

In the 13th and 14th centuries, the area came under the influence of empires to the east; the Jolof Empire was founded during this time. In the Senegambia region between the 14th and 20th century, close to one-third of the population was enslaved, typically as a result of being taken captive in warfare.

In the 14th century, the Jolof Empire grew more powerful, having united Cayor and the kingdoms of Baol, Siné, Saloum, Waalo, Futa Tooro and Bambouk, covering a large portion of West Africa. The empire was a voluntary confederacy of various states rather than a state built on military conquest. The empire was founded by Ndiadiane Ndiaye, a part Serer and part Toucouleur, who was able to form a coalition with many ethnicities, but collapsed around 1549 following the defeat and death of Lele Fouli Fak at the hands of Amari Ngone Sobel Fall.

=== Colonial era ===
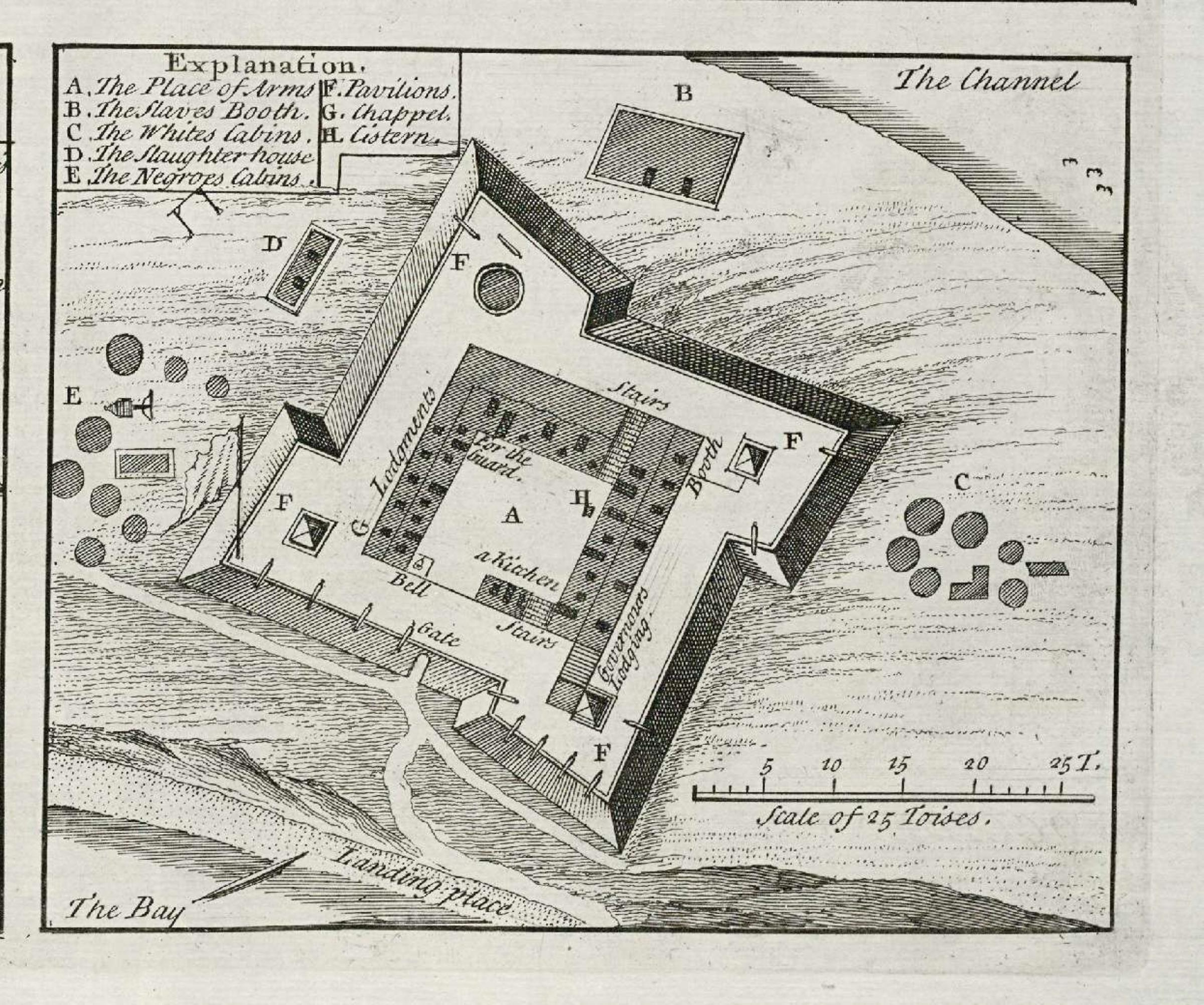
The Portuguese Empire was the first European power to colonize Senegal, beginning with the arrival of Dinis Dias in 1444 at Gorée Island and ending in 1888, when the Portuguese gave Ziguinchor to the French.

In the mid-15th century, the Portuguese landed on the West African coast, followed by traders representing other countries, including the French. Various European powers—Portugal, the Netherlands, and Great Britain—competed for trade in the area from the 15th century onward.

In 1677, France gained control of what had become a minor hub in the Atlantic slave trade: the island of Gorée, near modern Dakar, was used as a base to purchase slaves from the warring chiefdoms on the mainland.

European missionaries introduced Christianity to Senegal and the Casamance in the 19th century. In the 1850s the French began to expand onto the Senegalese mainland, after they abolished slavery and began promoting an abolitionist doctrine, adding native kingdoms like the Waalo, Cayor, Baol, and Jolof. French colonists under Governor Louis Faidherbe progressively invaded and took over all the kingdoms, except the Serer Kingdoms of Sine and Saloum.

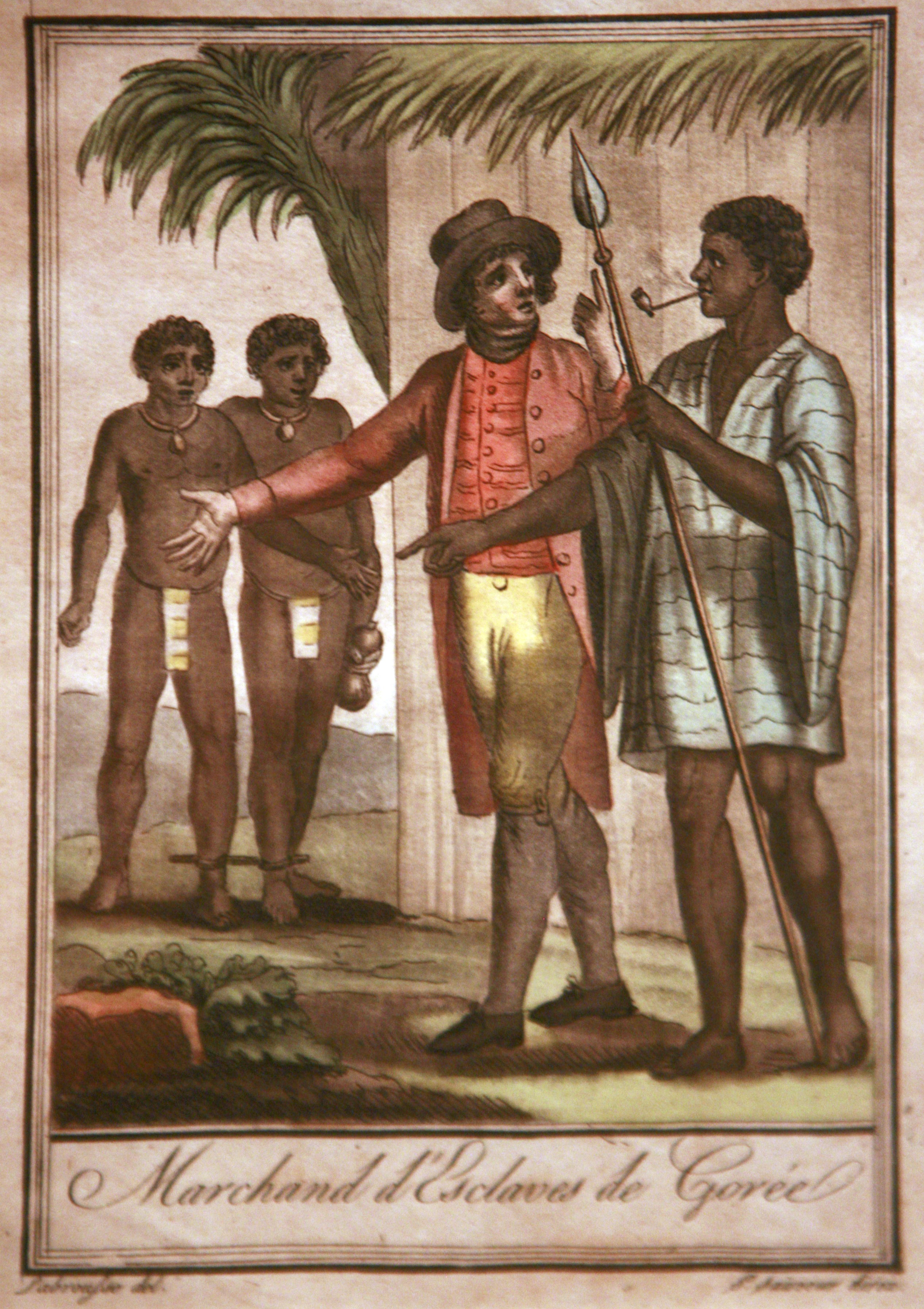
French and local slave traders in Gorée, 18th century

Yoro Dyao was in command of the canton of Foss-Galodjina and was set over Wâlo (Ouâlo) by Faidherbe, where he served as a chief from 1861 to 1914. Senegalese resistance to the French expansion was led in part by Lat-Dior, damel of Cayor, and Maad a Sinig Kumba Ndoffene Famak Joof (the Maad a Sinig, King of Sine), resulting in the Battle of Logandème―the battle in which the Serer King of Sine went to war against the French colonial empire, where the French decided to take revenge against Sine following their humiliating defeat at the Battle of Djilor. The Battle of Logandème was the first battle on Senegambian soil in which the French employed cannonballs.

The Battle of Dakar (23–25 September 1940) was an unsuccessful Allied attempt to capture the strategic port and overthrow the pro-German Vichy French colonial administration. On 25 November 1958, Senegal became an autonomous republic within the French Union.

=== Independence ===
The short-lived Mali Federation

In January 1959, Senegal and the French Sudan merged to form the Mali Federation, which became fully independent on 20 June 1960. The federation broke up on 20 August when Senegal and French Sudan (renamed the Republic of Mali) each proclaimed independence.

Léopold Sédar Senghor was elected Senegal's first president in August 1960. Pro-African Senghor advocated a brand of African socialism.

=== 1980 to present ===
In 1980, Senghor decided to retire from politics. In 1981, he transferred power to his hand-picked successor, Abdou Diouf. Former Prime Minister Mamadou Dia, who was Senghor's rival, ran for election in 1983 against Diouf but lost. Diouf was president between 1981 and 2000. He encouraged broader political participation, reduced government involvement in the economy, and widened Senegal's diplomatic engagements, particularly with other developing nations. Domestic politics on occasion spilled over into street violence, border tensions, and a violent separatist movement in the southern region of the Casamance. Nevertheless, Senegal's commitment to democracy and human rights strengthened. Diouf served four terms as president.

In the 1980s, Boubacar Lam discovered Senegalese oral history that was initially compiled by the Tuculor noble Yoro Dyâo not long after World War I, which documents migrations into West Africa from the Nile valley; ethnic groups from the Senegal River to the Niger Delta retained traditions of having an eastern origin.

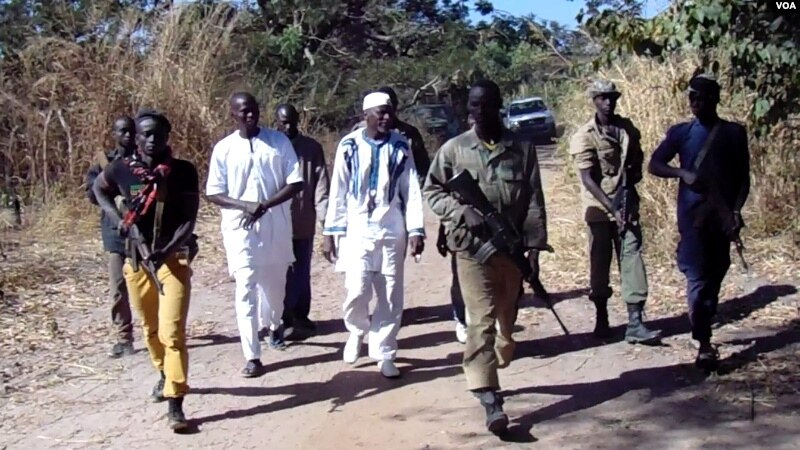
MFDC fighters in the Casamance region of Senegal, c. 2017

Senegal joined with The Gambia to form the nominal Senegambia Confederation on 1 February 1982. However, the union was dissolved in 1989. Despite peace talks, a southern separatist group (Movement of Democratic Forces of Casamance or MFDC) in the Casamance region has clashed sporadically with government forces since 1982 in the Casamance conflict.

In the 1999 presidential election, opposition leader Abdoulaye Wade defeated Diouf, an election deemed free and fair by international observers. Senegal experienced its second peaceful transition of power, and its first from one political party to another. In 2004, Wade announced that he would sign a peace treaty with the separatist group in the Casamance region. The Casamance conflict, however, has not yet been fully concluded as of 2025 despite several cease fires and treaties between the government and individual factions within the MFDC.

In the 2012 presidential election, Macky Sall was elected president. Sall held talks with MFDC rebels in Rome in December 2012. Sall was re-elected in 2019 elections. The presidential term was subsequently reduced from seven years to five years.

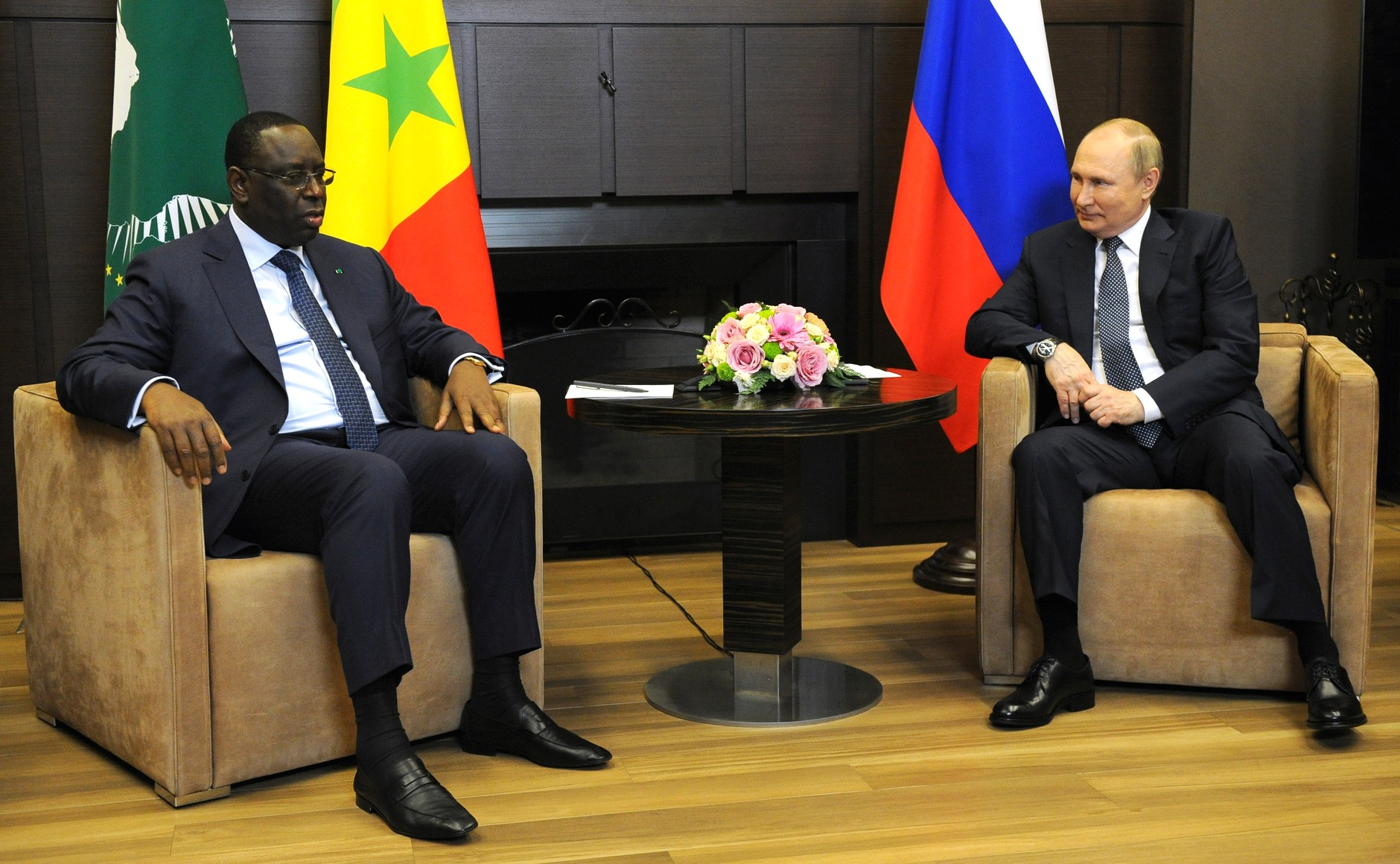
Senegalese President Macky Sall with Russian President Vladimir Putin in Sochi, Russia, 3 June 2022

Since 3 March 2021, Senegal has been rocked by a series of mass protests in response to the arrest of Ousmane Sonko for alleged rape and mishandling of the COVID-19 pandemic. In June 2023, the response to the protests turned increasingly violent, with Amnesty International counting 23 fatalities, most of which were caused by bullets fired by police or armed police collaborators.

Bassirou Diomaye Faye won the 2024 presidential election over the ruling coalition's candidate, becoming the youngest president in Senegal's history. In November, Faye announced that France would withdraw its troops from Senegal and close its bases by the end of 2025. On 1 July 2025, France handed over the Rufisque joint station to Senegal. Active since 1960, this facility was responsible for communications on the southern Atlantic coast and served as a listening post in efforts to combat maritime trafficking. On 17 July, the two military sites were returned to the Senegalese government: the airport base and Camp Geille, a 5-hectare site located in Ouakam. Four villas located in Plateau, near the port, were also transferred.

== Government and politics ==
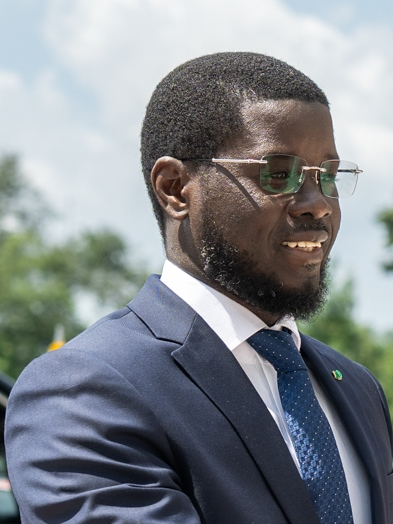
Bassirou Diomaye Faye, president of Senegal)

Senegal is a republic with a presidency; the president is elected every five years. The current president is Bassirou Diomaye Faye. Senegal has more than 80 political parties. The unicameral parliament consists of the National Assembly, which has 150 seats (In 2012 lawmakers voted to abolish the Senate to save an estimated $15 million.) Senegal also has an independent judiciary. The highest courts that deal with business issues are the Constitutional Council and the Court of Justice, both of which have members appointed by the president.

=== Political culture ===
Senegal has a quasi-democratic political culture, one of the more successful post-colonial democratic transitions in Africa. Local administrators are appointed and held accountable by the president. Marabouts, religious leaders of the various Muslim brotherhoods of Senegal, have exerted strong political influence, especially during Wade's presidency. In 2009, Freedom House downgraded Senegal's status from "Free" to "Partially Free" because of increased centralisation of power in the executive branch. By 2014, it had recovered its Free status.

In 2022, Senegal was ranked 9th on the Ibrahim Index of African Governance, which reflects the success with which governments deliver essential political goods to their citizens. The 2012 presidential election was controversial because the opposition argued Wade was not eligible to run again. Several youth opposition movements, including M23 and Y'en a Marre, emerged in June 2011. In the end, Sall of the Alliance for the Republic won, and Wade conceded the election. This peaceful and democratic transition was hailed by many foreign observers, including the EU, as a show of "maturity". The ruling party won a landslide victory in the 2017 parliamentary election, taking 125 seats in the 165-seat National Assembly. In 2019 president Sall easily won re-election in the first round. In 2024 Faye was sworn in.

=== Leadership in world governance initiatives ===
Senegal has been one of the signatories to the agreement to convene a convention to draft a world constitution. As a result, in 1968World Constituent Assembly convened to draft and adopt the Constitution for the Federation of Earth. Léopold Sédar Senghor, then president of Senegal, signed the agreement to convene a World Constituent Assembly.

=== Administrative divisions ===
Regions of Senegal

Senegal is subdivided into 14 regions, each administered by a Conseil Régional (Regional Council) elected by population weight at the Arrondissement level. The country is further subdivided into 45 Départements, 113 Arrondissements (neither of which has an administrative function), and Collectivités Locales, which elect administrative officers.

Regional capitals have the same name as their respective regions:

- Dakar
- Diourbel
- Fatick
- Kaffrine
- Kaolack
- Kédougou
- Kolda
- Louga
- Matam
- Saint-Louis
- Sédhiou
- Tambacounda
- Thiès
- Ziguinchor

=== Foreign relations ===
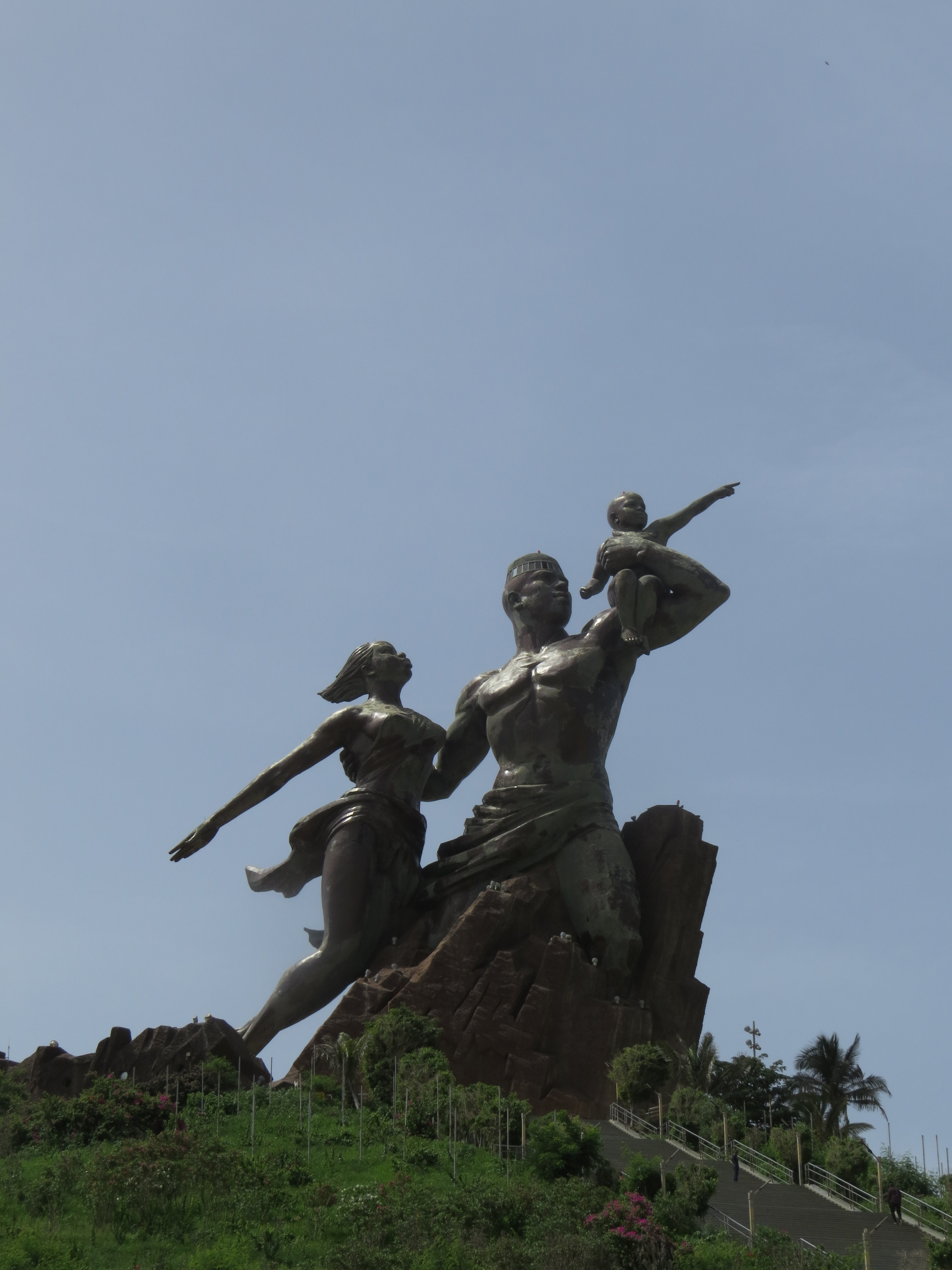
The African Renaissance Monument was a $27 million project by Abdoulaye Wade that triggered popular protests.

Senegal has a high profile in many international organizations and was a member of the UN Security Council in 1988–1989 and 2015–2016. It was elected to the UN Commission on Human Rights in 1997. Friendly toward the West, especially the United States, Senegal has vigorously advocated for greater assistance from developed countries. Senegal is well integrated with the central bodies of the international community, including the Economic Community of West African States (ECOWAS), the African Union (AU), and the Community of Sahel–Saharan States.

Historically, Senegal has been close to France, its former colonizer, but this has caused significant tension with the people and was one of the reasons President Sall lost support. Senegalese often complained that Sall consistently awarded French companies priority contracts to extract natural resources rather than giving them to whoever offered the best deal. They also believed France was pushing Sall to run for an unconstitutional third term. After debating whether to run a third time for months, Sall did not.

In 2011, Senegal severed diplomatic ties with Iran, saying it supplied rebels with weapons which killed Senegalese troops in the Casamance conflict. Senegal enjoys cordial relations primarily with its neighbors. Despite evident progress on other issues with Mauritania (border security, resource management, economic integration, etc.), an estimated 35,000 Mauritanian refugees (of the 40,000 who were expelled from their home country in 1989) remain in Senegal. Morocco–Senegal relations have been courteous, and Faye invited the king of Morocco on his inauguration ceremony in 2024. Senegal is the 84th most peaceful country in the world, according to the 2024 Global Peace Index.

=== Military ===
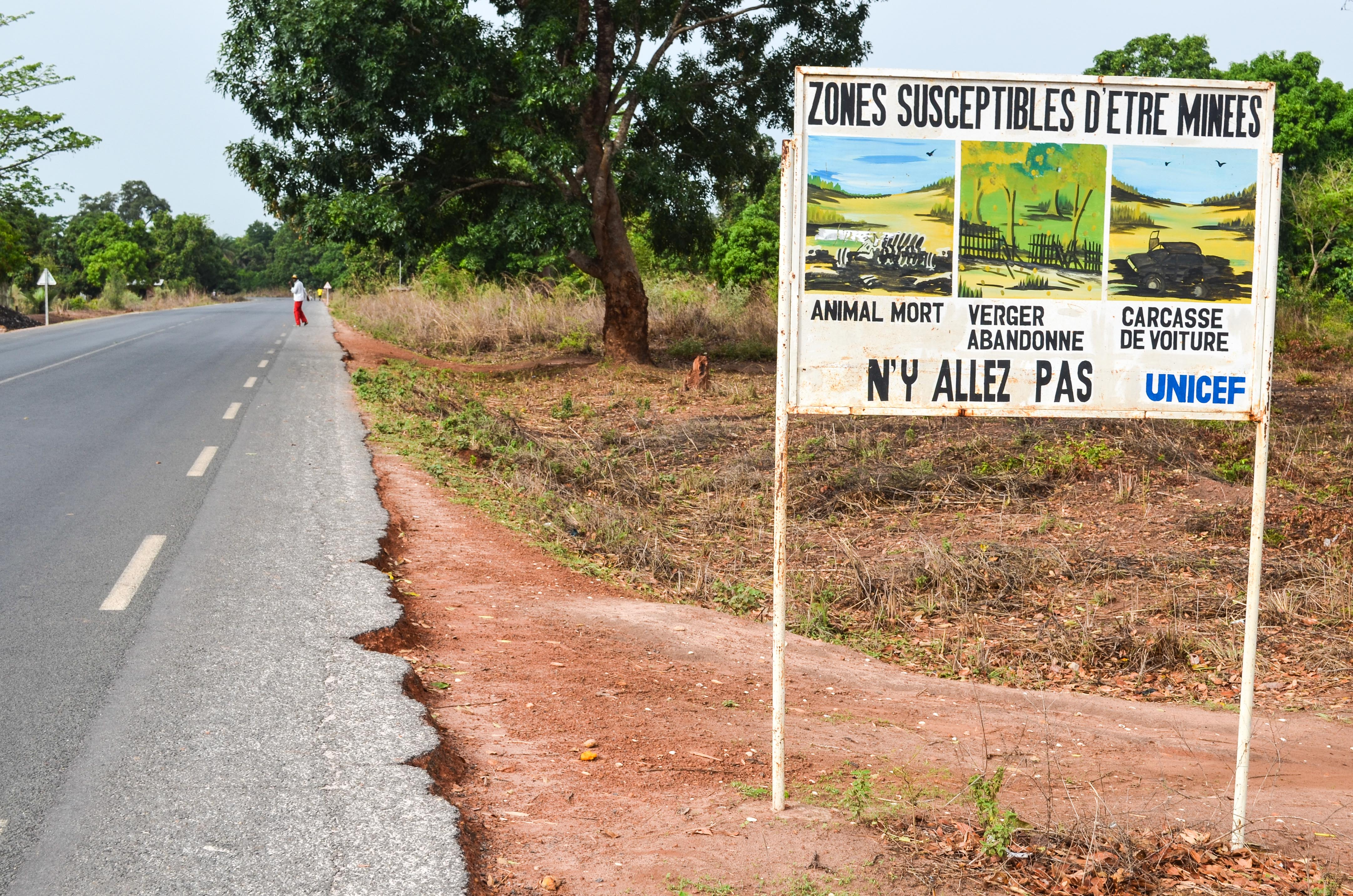
Land mines were widely used in the Casamance conflict between separatist rebels and the central government.

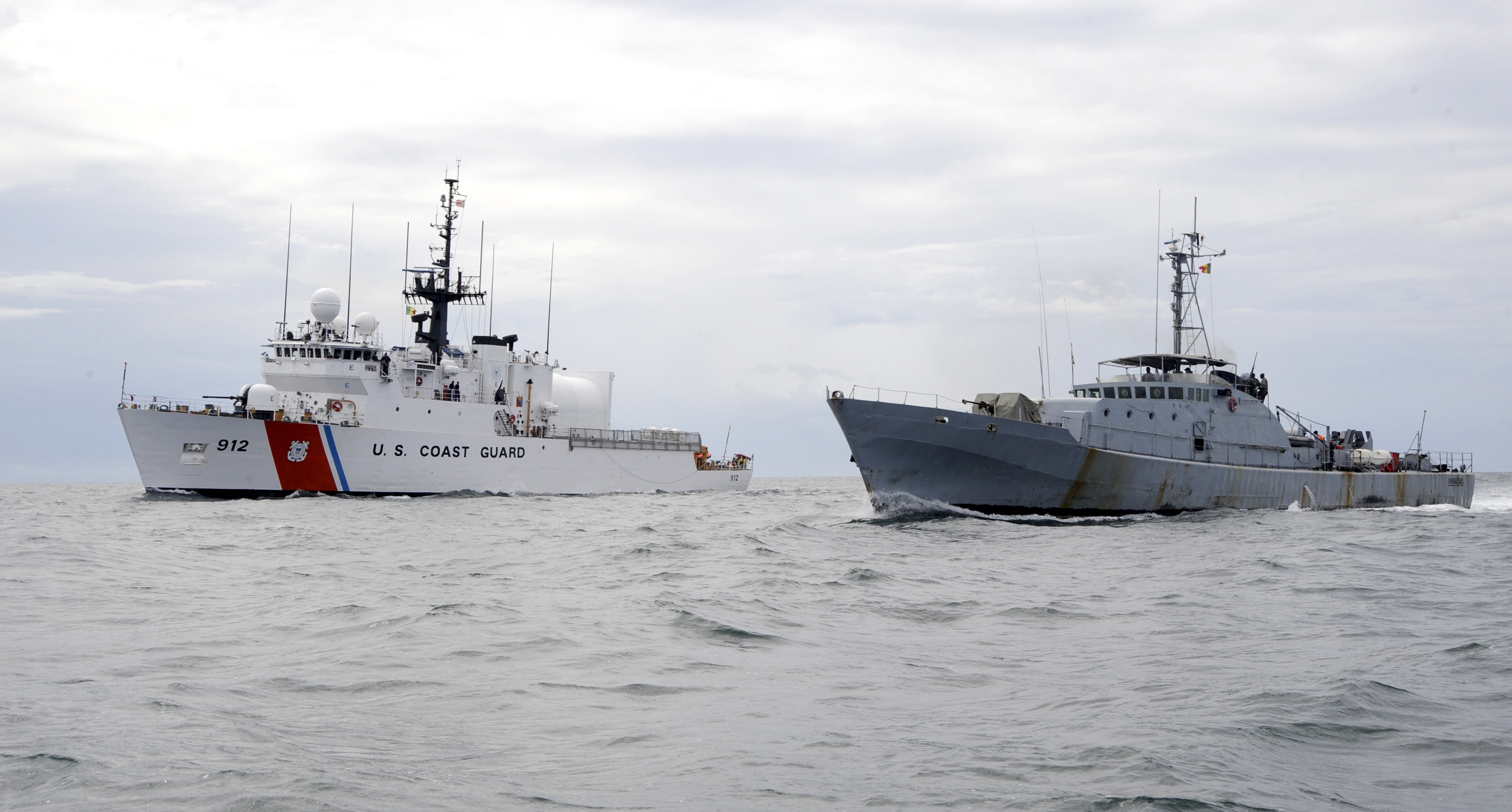
Senegalese patrol vessel Poponquine training with a United States Coast Guard vessel off the coast of Senegal

The Armed Forces of Senegal consist of about 17,000 personnel in the army, air force, navy, and gendarmerie. The military receives most of its training, equipment, and support from France and the United States, and to a lesser extent, Germany.

Military non-interference in political affairs has contributed to Senegal's stability since independence. Senegal has participated in many international and regional peacekeeping missions. Most recently, in 2000, Senegal sent a battalion to the Democratic Republic of Congo to participate in MONUC, the United Nations peacekeeping mission, and agreed to deploy a US-trained battalion to Sierra Leone for UNAMSIL, another UN peacekeeping mission. In 2015, Senegal participated in the Saudi Arabian-led military intervention in Yemen against the Houthis.

=== Law ===
Senegal is a secular state, as defined in its constitution. To fight corruption, the government has established the National Anti-Corruption Office (OFNAC) and the Commission for the Restitution and Recovery of Illegally Acquired Assets. According to the Business Anti-Corruption Portal, President Sall created the OFNAC to replace the Commission Nationale de Lutte Contre la non-Transparence, la Corruption et la Concussion (CNLCC). It is said that the OFNAC represents a more effective tool for fighting corruption than the CNLCC established under President Wade. The mission of OFNAC is to fight corruption, embezzlement of public funds, and fraud. OFNAC has the power of self-referral (own initiative investigation). OFNAC is composed of twelve members appointed by decree.

Homosexuality is illegal. According to a 2013 survey by the Pew Research Center, 96% of Senegalese believe that homosexuality should not be accepted by society. LGBTQ community members report a strong feeling of being unsafe.

== Geography ==
Senegal map of Köppen climate classification

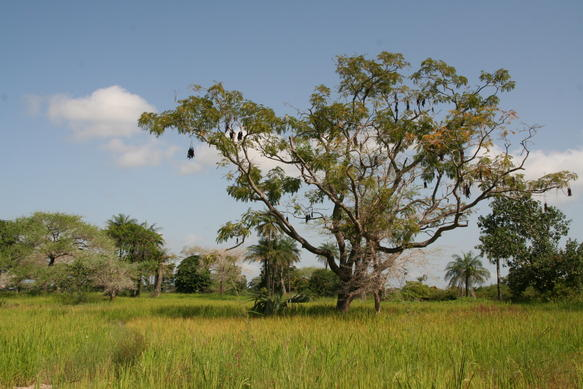
Landscape of Casamance

Senegal is located on the western coast of Africa. It lies between latitudes 12° and 17°N, and longitudes 11° and 18°W. It is bounded by the Atlantic Ocean to the west, Mauritania to the north, Mali to the east, and Guinea and Guinea-Bissau to the south; internally it almost completely surrounds The Gambia, namely on the north, east and south, except for Gambia's short Atlantic coastline.

The landscape consists mainly of the rolling sandy plains of the western Sahel, which rise to foothills in the southeast. The highest point, Baunez ridge, is situated southeast of Nepen Diakha at 648 m (2,126 ft). The northern border is formed by the Senegal River; other rivers include the Gambia and Casamance Rivers. The capital Dakar lies on the Cap-Vert (Cape Green) peninsula, the westernmost point of continental Africa.

The Cape Verde islands lie some 560 kilometres (350 mi) off the coast, but Cap-Vert is a maritime placemark, set at the foot of "Les Mammelles", a 105-metre (344 ft) cliff resting at one end of the Cap-Vert peninsula on which is Dakar, and 1 kilometre (0.6 mi) south of the "Pointe des Almadies", the westernmost point in Africa.

Senegal contains four terrestrial ecoregions: Guinean forest-savanna mosaic, Sahelian Acacia savanna, West Sudanian savanna, and Guinean mangroves.

=== Climate ===
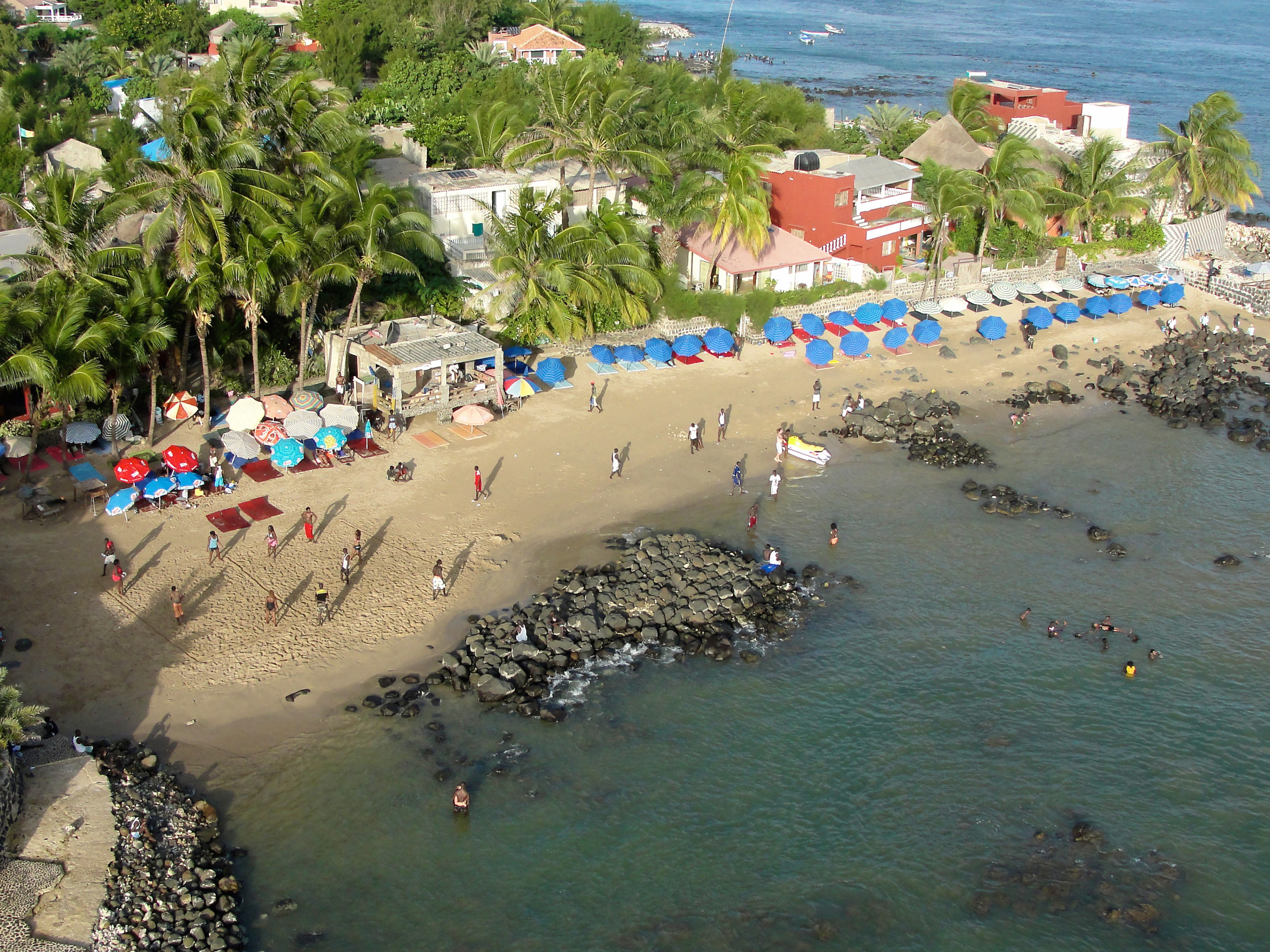
Beach at N'Gor

Senegal is mainly a sunny and dry country, with a tropical climate with pleasant year-round heat and well-defined dry and humid seasons driven by northeast winter and southwest summer winds. The dry season (December to April) is characterized by hot, dry harmattan winds. Dakar's annual rainfall of about 600 mm (24 in) occurs between June and October when maximum temperatures average 30 °C (86.0 °F) and minimums 24.2 °C (75.6 °F); December to February maximum temperatures average 25.7 °C (78.3 °F) and minimums 18 °C (64.4 °F).

Interior temperatures are higher than along the coast (for example, average daily temperatures in Kaolack and Tambacounda for May are 30 °C (86.0 °F) and 32.7 °C (90.9 °F) respectively, compared to Dakar's 23.2 °C (73.8 °F) ), and rainfall increases substantially farther south, exceeding 1,500 mm (59.1 in) annually in some areas.

In Tambacounda, located in the far interior near the Mali border where the desert begins, temperatures can reach 54 °C (129.2 °F). The Lompoul desert in the north has a near-hot desert climate, the central part has a hot semi-arid climate. The south has a tropical wet and dry climate.

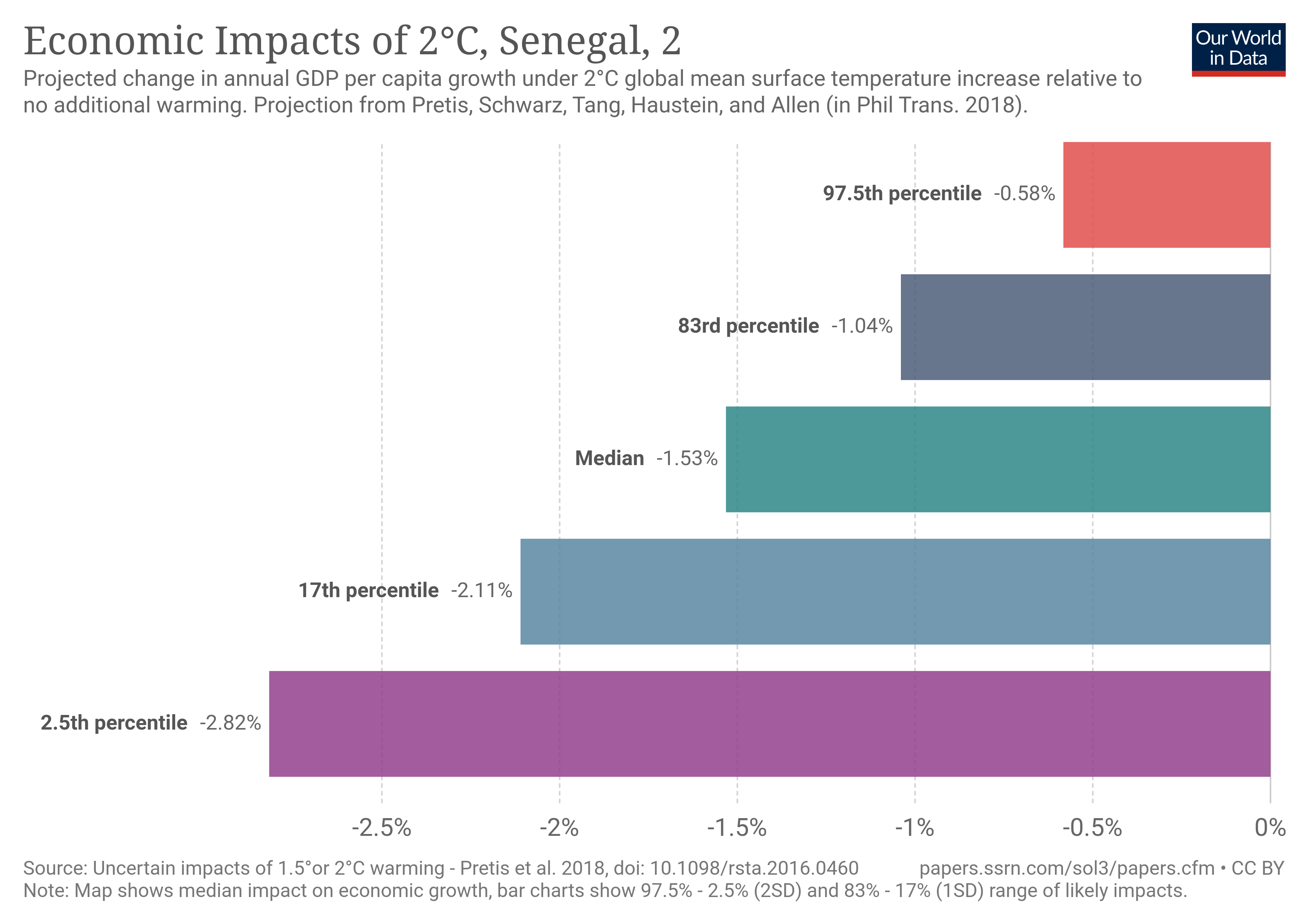
Economic impact of 2°C in Senegal

Climate change in Senegal will have wide reaching impacts on many aspects of life in Senegal. Climate change will cause an increase in average temperatures over west Africa by between 1.5 and 4 °C (3 °F and 7 °F) by mid-century, relative to 1986–2005. Projections of rainfall indicate an overall decrease in rainfall and an increase in intense mega-storm events over the Sahel. The sea level is expected to rise faster in West Africa than the global average. Although Senegal is currently not a major contributor to global greenhouse gas emissions, it is one of the countries most vulnerable to climate change.

Extreme drought is impacting agriculture, and causing food and job insecurity. More than 70% of the population is employed in the agricultural sector. Sea level rise and resulting coastal erosion is expected to cause damage to coastal infrastructure and displace a large percentage of the population living in coastal areas. Climate change also has the potential to increase land degradation that will likely increase desertification in eastern Senegal, leading to an expansion of the Sahara.

== Economy ==
Senegal has a developing economy driven by mining, construction, tourism, fishing and agriculture, which are the main sources of employment in rural areas. Natural resources include iron, zircon, gold, phosphates, and now oil and gas. In the past Senegal's economy gained most of its foreign exchange from fish, phosphates, groundnuts, tourism. One of the historically dominant parts of the economy, agricultural, is highly vulnerable to environmental conditions such as variations in rainfall and climate, and fluctuations in world commodity prices. It is a member of the World Trade Organization.

The capital of Senegal, Dakar, was the former capital of all of French West Africa. As a result, it remains the home to major banks and other institutions which serve all of Francophonic West Africa and is the hub for shipping and transport into and out of the entire region, which benefits landlocked neighboring Mali.

Senegal has one of the most developed tourist industries in Africa. The main obstacles to the economic development of the country are its great corruption with inefficient justice, very slow administrative formalities, and a failing education sector.

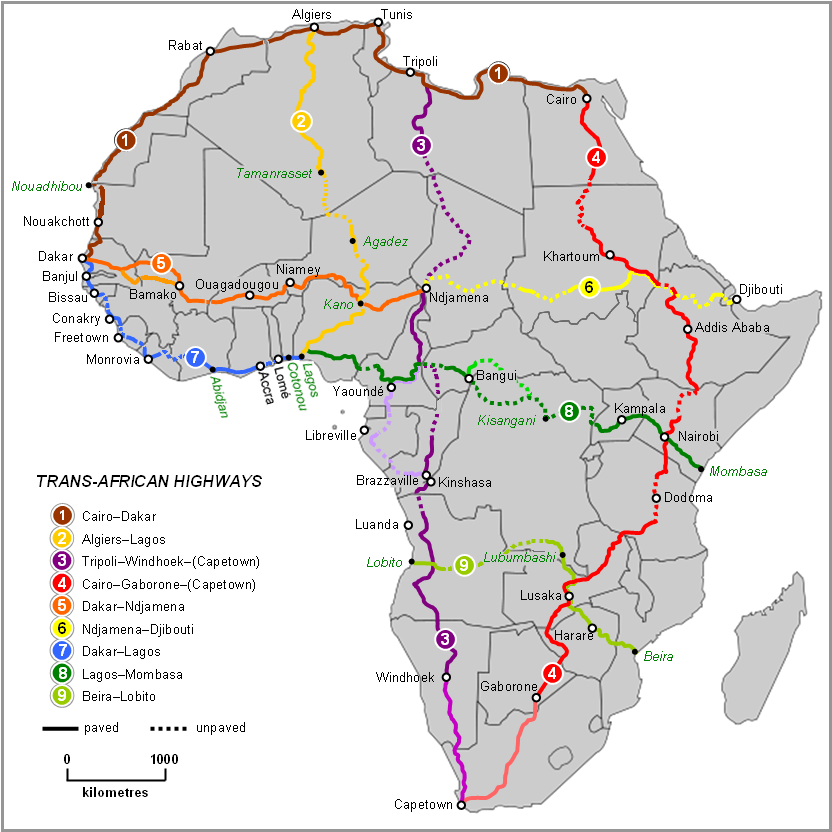

Historical development of real GDP per capita in Senegal and Gambia, since 1950

=== Industry and trade ===
Three trans-African automobile routes pass through Senegal:

- Cairo-Dakar Highway (1)
- Dakar-Ndjamena Highway (5)
- Dakar-Lagos Highway (7)

The main industries include food processing, mining, cement, artificial fertilizer, chemicals, textiles, refining imported petroleum, and tourism. Exports include fish, chemicals, cotton, fabrics, groundnuts, and calcium phosphate. The largest export markets as of 2020 are Mali (20.4%), Switzerland (12.2%), and India (8.3%).

As a member of the West African Economic and Monetary Union, Senegal is working toward greater regional integration with a unified external tariff. Senegal is also a member of the Organization for the Harmonization of Business Law in Africa. Senegal achieved full Internet connectivity in 1996, creating a mini-boom in information technology-based services. Private activity accounts for 82 percent of its GDP. On the negative side, Senegal faces deep-seated urban problems of chronic high unemployment. Senegal is a major recipient of international development assistance. Donors include the United States Agency for International Development, Japan, France, and China. Over 4,000 Peace Corps Volunteers have served in Senegal since 1963.

=== Agriculture ===
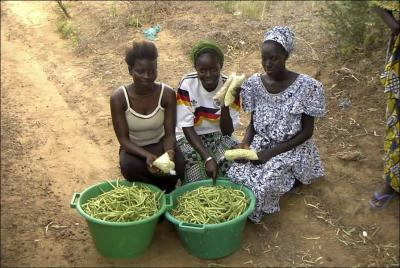
Cowpea vendors near Thies, Senegal

Agriculture is one of the dominant parts of Senegal's economy, even though Senegal lies within the drought-prone Sahel region. As only a tiny percentage of the land is irrigated, Senegal continues to rely on rain-fed agriculture. Agriculture occupies about 75% of the workforce. Despite a relatively wide variety of agricultural production, most farmers produce for subsistence needs. Millet, rice, corn, and sorghum are the primary food crops grown in Senegal. Production is subject to drought and threats of pests such as locusts, birds, fruit flies, and white flies. Moreover, the effects of climate change in Senegal are expected to severely harm the agricultural economy due to extreme weather such as drought, as well as increased temperatures.

Senegal is a net food importer, particularly for rice, which represents almost 75% of cereal imports. Peanuts, sugarcane, and cotton are important cash crops, and a wide variety of fruits and vegetables are grown for local and export markets. In 2006, gum arabic exports soared to $280 million, making it by far the leading agricultural export. Green beans, industrial tomato, cherry tomato, melon, and mango are Senegal's main vegetable cash crops. The Casamance region, isolated from the rest of Senegal by Gambia, is an important agricultural producing area, but without the infrastructure or transportation links to improve its capacity.

Despite the lack of modernization of artisanal fishing, the fishing sector remains Senegal's main economic resource and major foreign exchange earner. The livestock and poultry sectors are relatively underdeveloped and have potential for modernization, development and growth. Senegal imports most of its milk and dairy products. The sector is inhibited due to low output and limited investments. The potential production of fauna and forest products is high and diversified, and could, if well organized, benefit poor farmers in rural areas. Although the agricultural sector was impacted by a locust invasion in 2004, it has recovered and gross agricultural production is expected to increase by 6.1% in 2006 and 5.1% in 2007.

=== Fishing ===
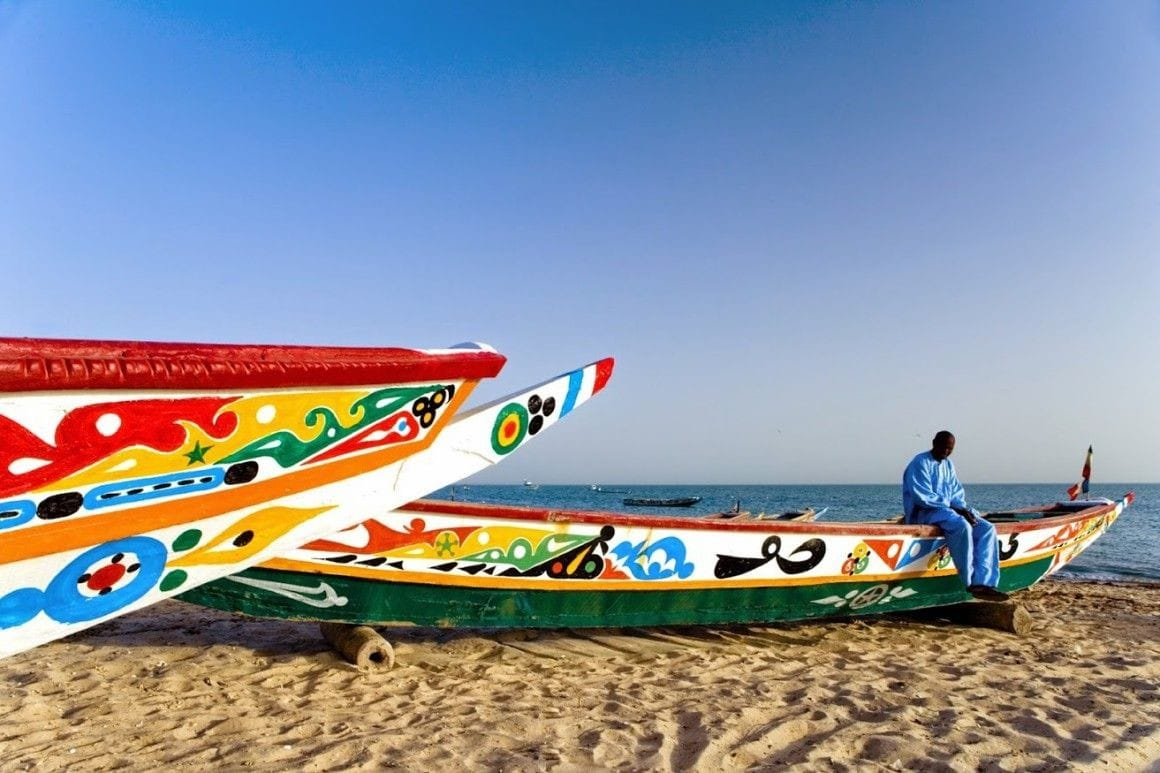
Fishing boats in Dakar

Senegal has a 12-nautical-mile (22 km; 14 mi) exclusive fishing zone. Fishing is a sizable sector of the economy, as 3.2 percent of GDP and around 600,000 jobs come from the fishing industry. Overfishing and illegal fishing from international vessels are serious issues and have severely impacted the number of fish caught. 57% of fish stocks are in a state of collapse, and some boats—especially trawlers—owned by other countries fly the Senegalese flag in order to evade the rules and fish in the country's waters, harming artisanal fishermen in the process. In 2024, Senegal publicly released the list of all boats with valid licenses allowed to fish in their waters as an effort to reduce IUU fishing.

=== Energy ===
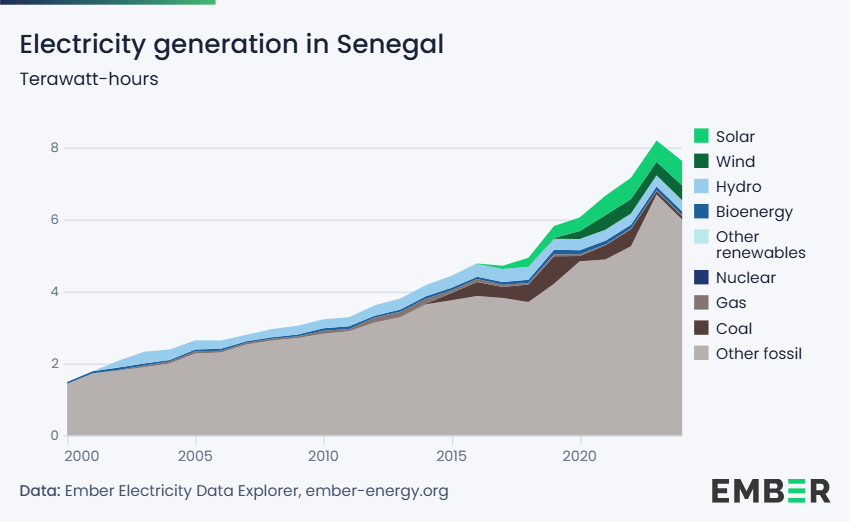
Electricity generation in Senegal in terawatt-hours

As of April 2020, the energy sector in Senegal has an installed capacity of 1431 megawatts (MW). Energy is produced by private operators and sold to the Senelec energy corporation. According to a 2020 report by the International Energy Agency, Senegal had nearly 70% of the country connected to the national grid. Current government strategies for electrification include investments in off-grid solar and connection to the grid.

Most of the energy production is from fossil fuels, mostly diesel and gas (733 of 864 MW). An increasing amount of the energy production comes from sustainable sources, such as Manantali Dam in Mali and a new wind farm in Thiès opened in 2020—however, it is still a small portion of the total production. Despite increases in production in the 2010s, the economy is frequently hindered by energy shortages compared to demand.

== Demographics ==
Senegal's population from 1960 to 2017 (in millions)

Senegal has a population of about 18 million, of whom about 42 percent live in rural areas. Density in these areas varies from about 77 inhabitants per square kilometre (200/sq mi) in the west-central region to 2 per square kilometre (5.2/sq mi) in the arid eastern section.

=== Gender ===
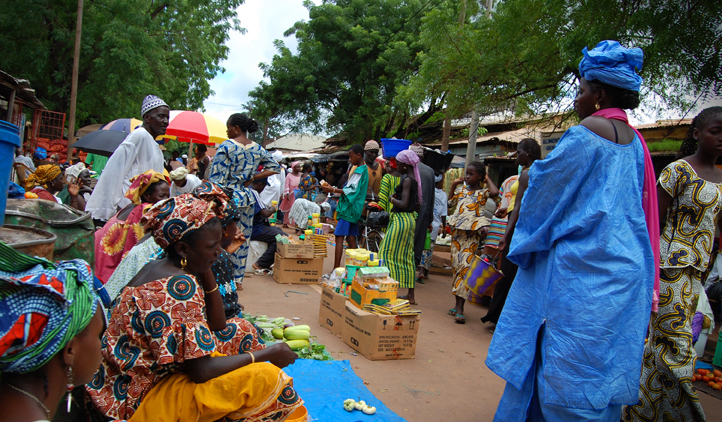
Women at the street market in Kolda

Senegal ratified the Convention on the Elimination of All Forms of Discrimination Against Women, adopted by the United Nations General Assembly, as well as the additional protocol. Senegal is a signatory to the African Charter on Human and Peoples' Rights, adopted at the 2003 African Union Summit. However, feminists have been critical of the government's lack of action in enforcing the protocols, conventions, and other texts that have been signed as a means of protecting women's rights, and have stated that everyday practices and customs typically maintain a patriarchal character. Similarly, Afrobarometer found that Senegalese women often remain in a disadvantaged position.

=== Ethnic groups ===
Senegal has a wide variety of ethnic groups and, as in most West African countries, several languages are widely spoken. According to "CIA World Factbook: Senegal" (2019 estimates), the ethnic groups are Wolof (39%); Fula (probably including the Halpulaar speaking Toucouleur) (27.5%); Serer group (probably including the Serer Cangin peoples) (16%); Mandinka (4.9%); Jola (4.2%); Soninke (2.4%); other 5.4% (includes Europeans and persons of Lebanese descent), and other minor ethnic groups like the Bassari, Maures or (Naarkajors).

Ethnic groups in Senegal
1. Wolof (39.0%)
2. Fulani (27.5%)
3. Serer (16.0%)
4. Mandinka (4.90%)
5. Jola (4.20%)
6. Sonike (2.40%)
7. Other (6.00%)

There are tens of thousands of Mauritanian refugees in Senegal, primarily in the country's north. According to the World Refugee Survey 2008, published by the U.S. Committee for Refugees and Immigrants, Senegal had a population of refugees and asylum seekers numbering approximately 23,800 in 2007. The majority of this population (20,200) is from Mauritania. Refugees live in N'dioum, Dodel, and small settlements along the Senegal River valley.

=== Languages ===
French is the official language, spoken by all those who have spent several years in the educational system, where French is used as the medium of instruction (Koranic schools are popular, but Arabic is less widely spoken outside the context of recitation). Overall, French speakers were estimated to make up 26% of the population in 2022. During the 15th century, many European territories started to engage in trade in Senegal. In the 19th century, France increased its colonial influence, and the number of French-speaking people grew steadily. French was ratified as the official language in 1960 when the country achieved independence.

Most people also speak their own ethnic language, while, especially in Dakar, Wolof is the lingua franca. Pulaar is spoken by the Fulas and Toucouleur. The Serer language is widely spoken by both Serers and non-Serers; so are the Cangin languages, whose speakers are ethnically Serers. Jola languages are widely spoken in the Casamance. Overall, Senegal is home to around 39 distinct languages. Several have the legal status of "national languages": Balanta-Ganja, Arabic, Jola-Fonyi, Mandinka, Mandjak, Mankanya, Noon (Serer-Noon), Pulaar, Serer, Soninke, and Wolof.

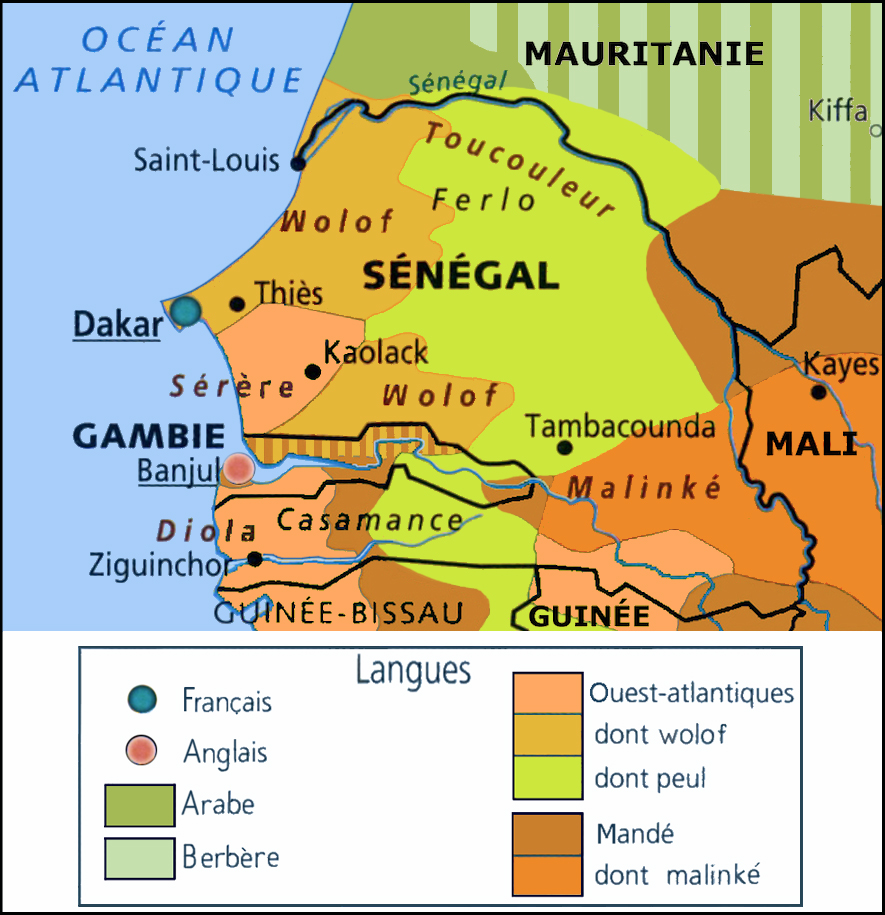
Ethnolinguistic map of Senegal

English is taught as a foreign language in secondary schools and many graduate school programs. It is the only subject matter that has a special office in the Ministry of Education. Dakar is home to a few bilingual schools which offer half of their curriculum in English. The Senegalese American Bilingual School, Yavuz Selim, and the West African College of the Atlantic teach in four-year programs. English is widely used by the scientific community and in business, including by the Modou-Modou (illiterate, self-taught businessmen).

Portuguese Creole, locally known as Portuguese, is a prominent minority language in Ziguinchor, spoken by local Portuguese creoles and immigrants from Guinea-Bissau. The local Cape Verdean community speaks a similar Portuguese creole, Cape Verdean Creole, as well as standard Portuguese. Portuguese was introduced in Senegal's secondary education in 1961 in Dakar by President Senghor. It is currently available in most of Senegal and in higher education. It is especially prevalent in Casamance, particularly in relation to local cultural identity.

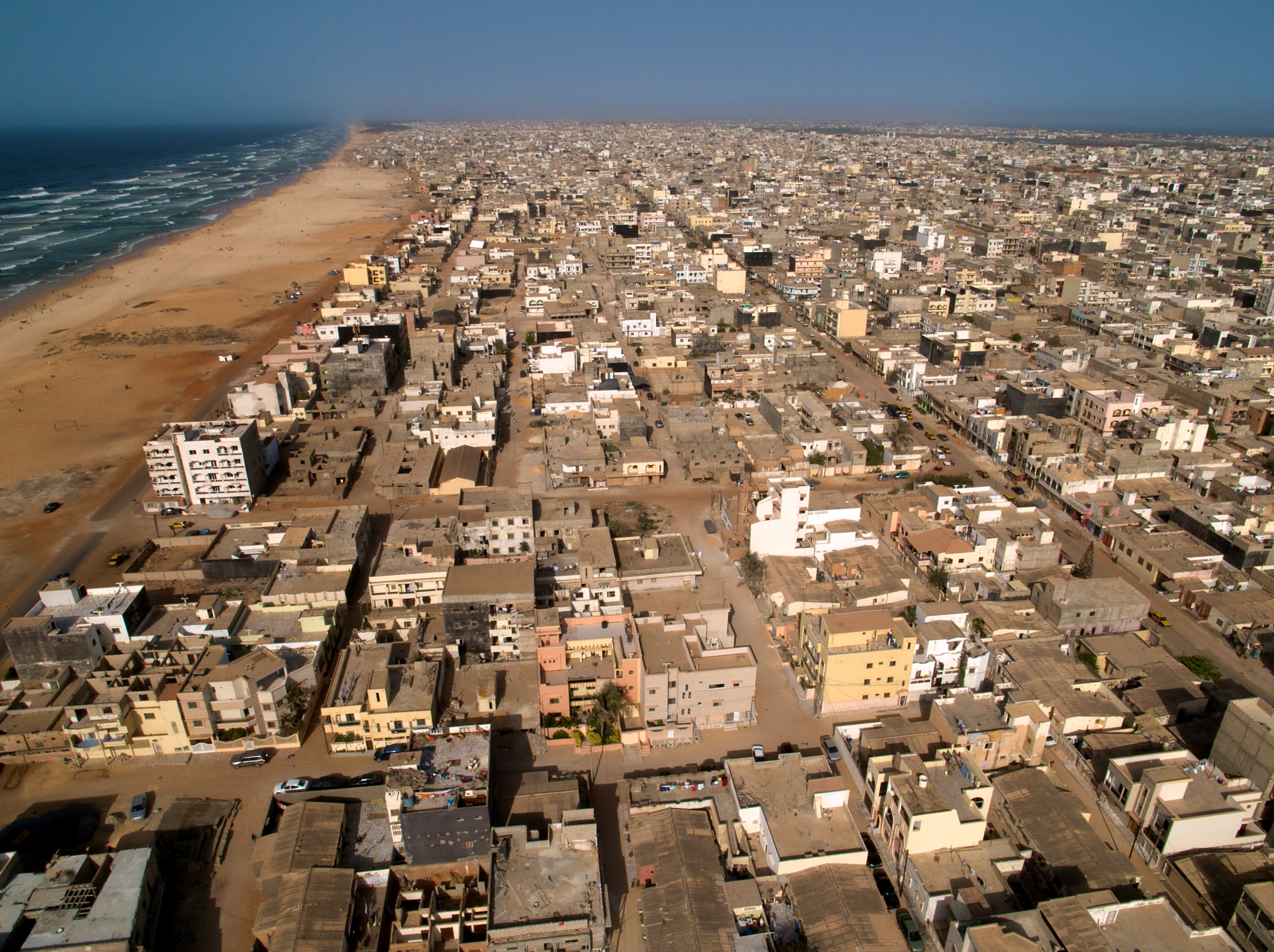
Aerial view of Yoff Commune, Dakar

A variety of immigrant languages are spoken, such as Bambara (70,000), Mooré (37,000), Kabuverdiano (34,000), Krio (6,100), Vietnamese (2,500), and Portuguese (1,700), mostly in Dakar. While French is the sole official language, a rising Senegalese linguistic nationalist movement supports the integration of Wolof, the country's common vernacular, into the national constitution. Senegalese regions of Dakar, Diourbel, Fatick, Kaffrine, Kaolack, Kedougou, Kolda, Louga, Matam, Saint-Louis, Sedhiou, Tambacounda, Thies, and Ziguinchor are members of the International Association of Francophone regions.

=== Largest cities ===
Dakar, the capital, is by far the largest city, with over two million residents. The second most populous city is Touba, a de jure communaute rurale (rural community), with over half a million people.

Largest cities or towns in Senegal According to the 2013 Census
Rank	Name	Region	Pop.
1	Dakar	Dakar	2,646,503
2	Touba	Diourbel	753,315
3	Pikine	Dakar	317,763
4	Kaolack	Kaolack	233,708
5	M'bour	Thiès	232,777
6	Rufisque	Dakar	221,066
7	Ziguinchor	Ziguinchor	205,294
8	Diourbel	Diourbel	133,705
9	Tambacounda	Tambacounda	107,293
10	Louga	Louga	104,349

=== Religion ===
Religion in Senegal (Pew Research Center 2024)
1. Islam (89.0%)
2. Christianity (10.0%)
3. Traditional faiths (1.00%)

Senegal is a secular state. According to the CIA World Factbook, Islam is the predominant religion, practiced by 97.2% of the population; the Christian community, at 2.7%, consists mostly of Roman Catholics, but there are also diverse Evangelical denominations. Less than 1% hold animist beliefs, particularly in the southeast. Some Serer people follow the Serer religion. According to the Berkley Center, "approximately 95 percent of the population is Muslim and the other five percent is primarily Christian or animist." Marloes Janson, of SOAS, University of London, and other scholars, posit that in Senegal, Gambia, and many African countries where Islam is dominant, Muslim communities tend to syncretise Islam with African traditional religions, leading to a distinctive "African Islam".

According to a 2012 Pew demographic study, 55% of the Muslims are Sunni of the Maliki madhhab with Sufi influences, whilst 27% are non-denominational Muslims. Islamic communities are generally organized around one of several Islamic Sufi orders called tariqas, headed by a khalif (xaliifa in Wolof, from Arabic khalīfa), who is usually a direct descendant of the group's founder; the study found that 92% of Muslims belonged to a Sufi order. The two most significant and prominent Sufi tariqas are the Tijaniyya, whose largest sub-groups are based in Tivaouane and Kaolack, and have a broad following in West Africa outside of Senegal, and the Murīdiyya (Murid), who are based in Touba and have a follower base mostly limited to within Senegal.

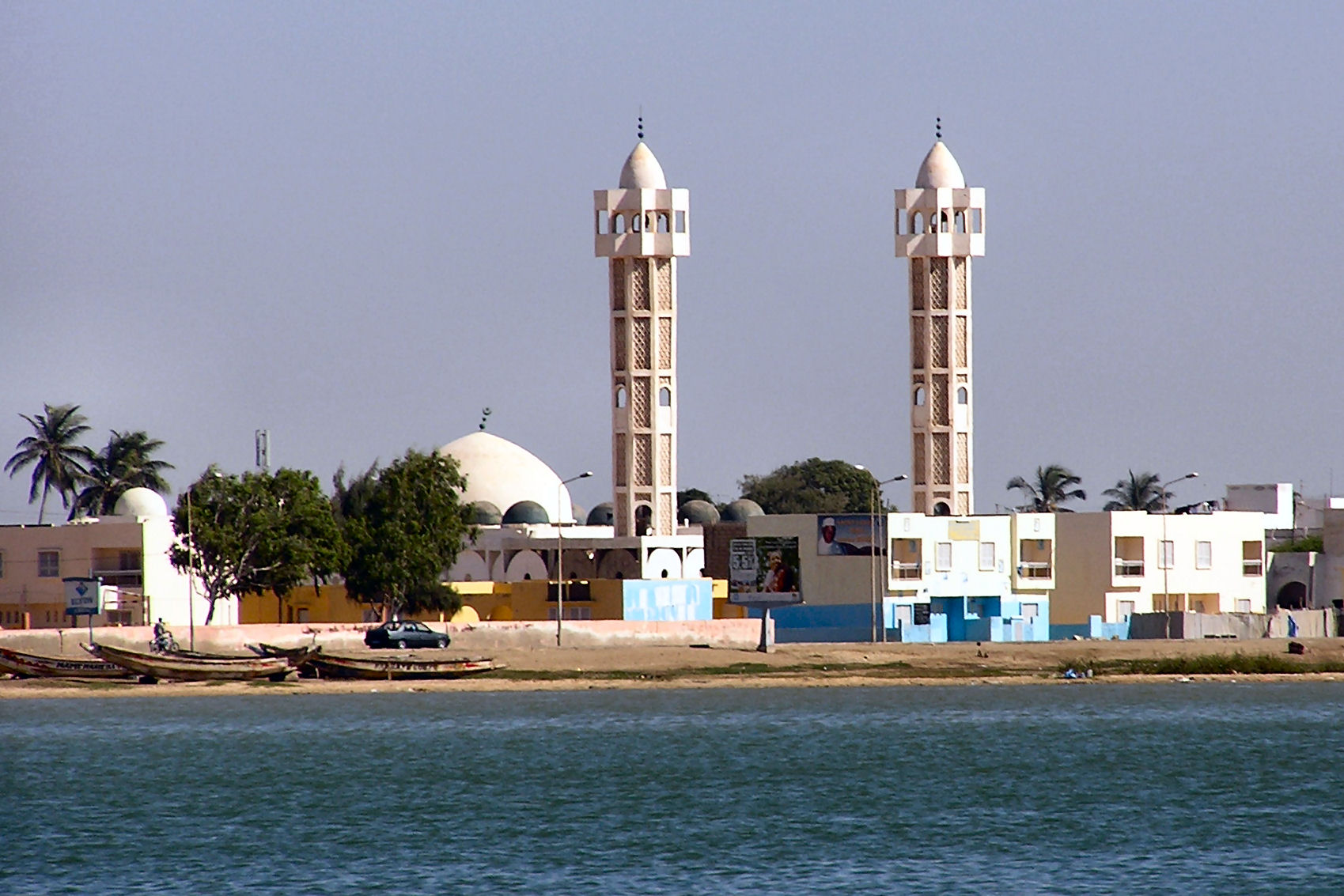
A mosque in Saint-Louis.

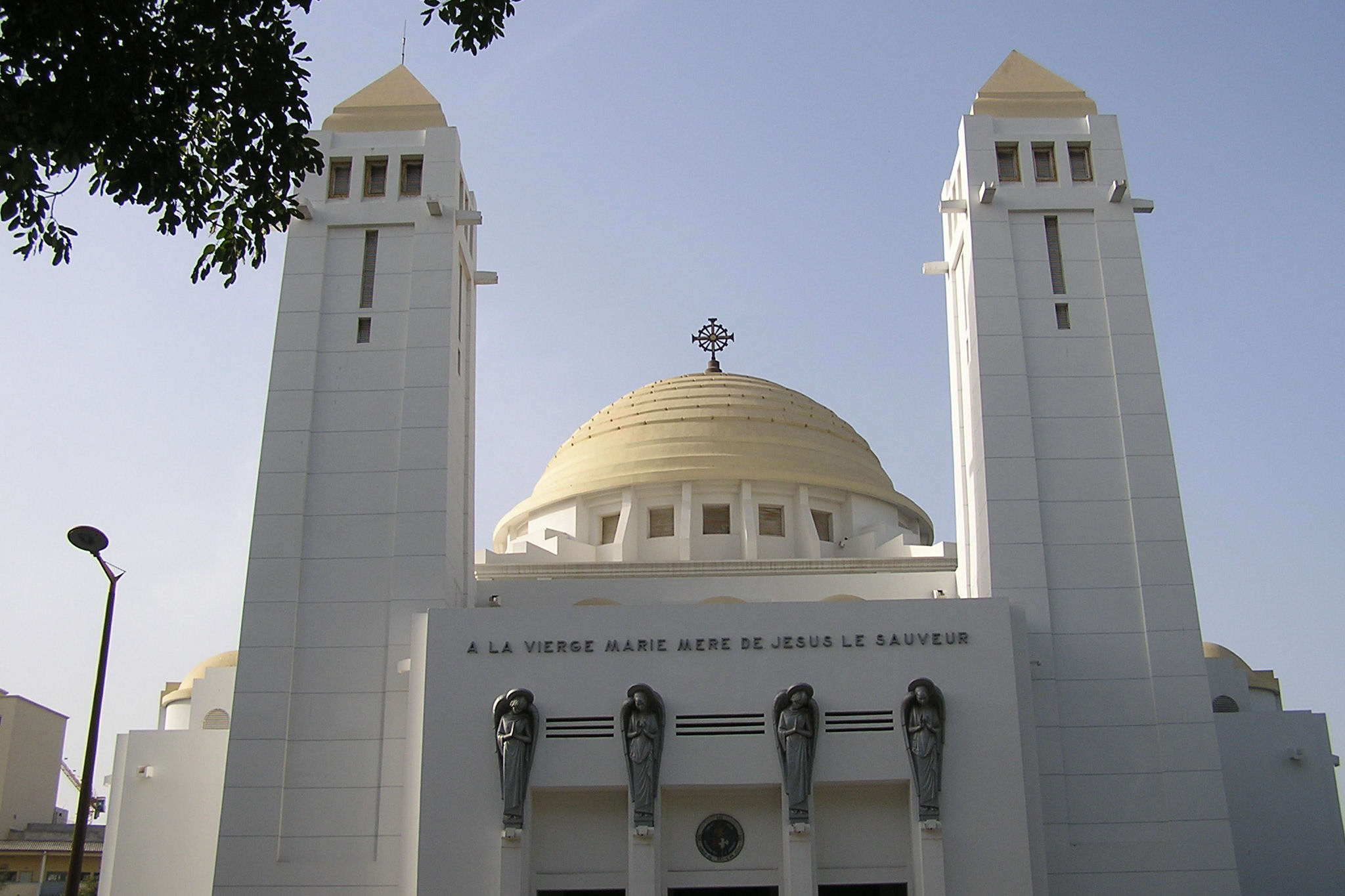
Our Lady of Victories Cathedral, a Catholic Church in Dakar.

The Halpulaar (Pulaar-speakers), composed of Fula people, a widespread group found along the Sahel from Chad to Senegal, and Toucouleurs, represent 23.8 percent of the population. Historically, they were the first to become Muslim. Many of the Toucouleurs, or sedentary Halpulaar of the Senegal River valley in the north, converted to Islam around a millennium ago and later contributed to Islam's propagation throughout Senegal. Most communities south of the Senegal River valley, however, were not thoroughly Islamized. The Serer people stood out as one of this group, who spent over one thousand years resisting Islamization (see Serer history). Although many Serers are Christians or Muslim, their conversion to Islam in particular is very recent and came of free will rather than by force, after forced conversion had been unsuccessfully tried centuries earlier (see Battle of Fandane-Thiouthioune).

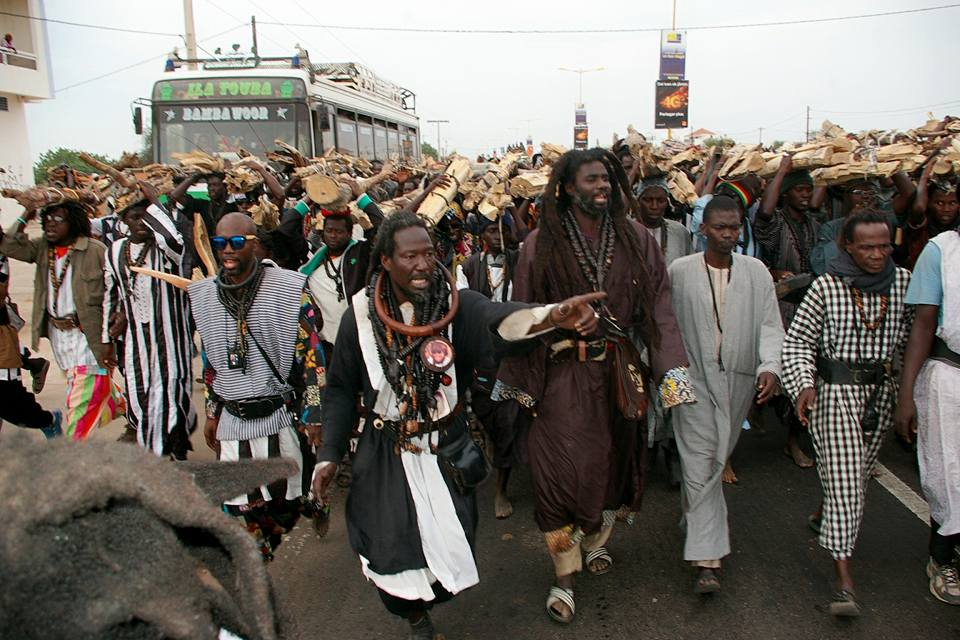
The Mouride brotherhood in Senegal

As a country with more than 90% Muslims, holidays such as Tabaski, Koriteh, Gamou, and Weri Kor are highly regarded. The spread of formal Quranic schools (called daara in Wolof) during the colonial period was driven mainly by the Tidjâniyya. In Murid communities, which place greater emphasis on the work ethic than on literary Quranic studies, the term daara often refers to work groups devoted to serving a religious leader. Today, most Senegalese children study at daaras for several years, memorizing as much of the Qur'an as they can. Some of them continue their religious studies at councils (majlis) or at the growing number of private Arabic schools and publicly funded Franco-Arabic schools.

Small Catholic communities are mainly found in coastal Serer, Jola, Mankanya, and Balant populations, and in eastern Senegal among the Bassari and Coniagui. Immigrants mainly attend Protestant churches, but during the second half of the 20th century, these churches, led by Senegalese leaders from different ethnic groups, have evolved. In Dakar, Catholic and Protestant rites are practiced by the Lebanese, Cape Verdean, European, and American immigrant populations, by certain Africans from other countries, and by the Senegalese themselves.

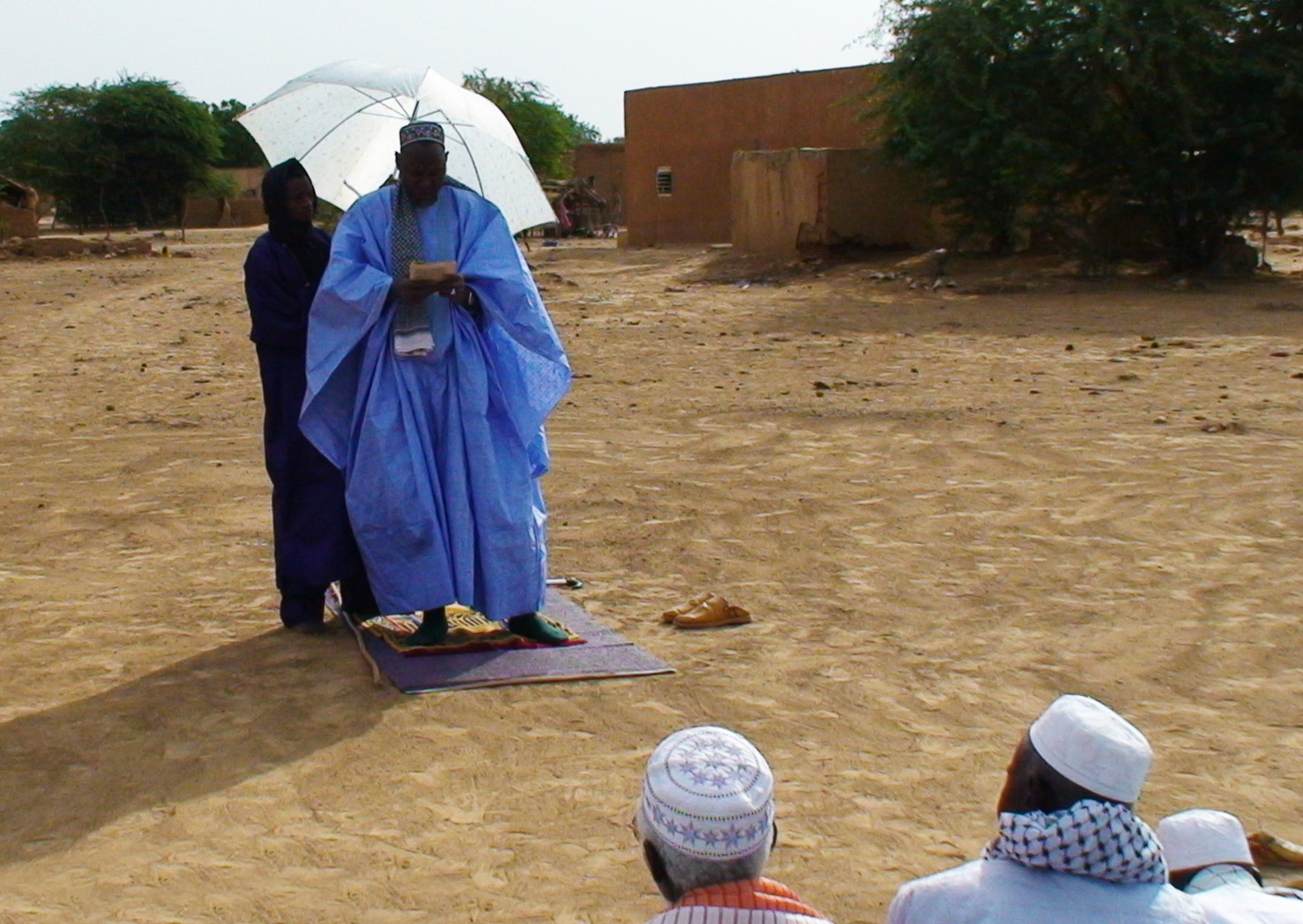
An imam in Senegal leading a prayer

Serer religion encompasses a belief in a supreme deity called Roog (Koox among the Cangin), Serer cosmogony, cosmology and divination ceremonies such as the annual Xooy (or Khoy) ceremony presided over by the Serer Saltigues (high priests and priestesses). They were ancient Serer festivals rooted in Serer religion, not Islam.

The Boukout is one of the Jola's religious ceremonies.

A small number of members of the Bani Israel tribe in the Senegalese bush claim Jewish ancestry. However, this is disputed. The Mahayana branch of Buddhism in Senegal is followed by a very tiny portion of the expat Vietnamese community. The Bahá'í Faith in Senegal was established after 'Abdu'l-Bahá, the son of the founder of the religion, mentioned Africa as a place that Bahá'ís should more broadly visit. The first Bahá'is to set foot in the territory of French West Africa that would become Senegal arrived in 1953. The first Bahá'í Local Spiritual Assembly of Senegal was elected in 1966 in Dakar. In 1975 the Bahá'í community elected the first National Spiritual Assembly of Senegal. The most recent estimate, by the Association of Religion Data Archives in a 2005 report, details the population of Senegalese Bahá'ís at 22,000.

=== Health ===
Development of life expectancy

Life expectancy at birth was estimated to be 66.8 years in 2016 (64.7 years male, 68.7 years female). Public expenditure on health was at 2.4 percent of the GDP in 2004, whereas private expenditure was at 3.5 percent. Health expenditure was at US$72 (PPP) per capita in 2004. The fertility rate ranged 5 to 5.3 between 2005 and 2013, with 4.1 in urban areas and 6.3 in rural areas, as official survey (6.4 in 1986 and 5.7 in 1997) point out. There were six physicians per 100,000 persons in the early 2000s (decade). Infant mortality was 157 per 1,000 live births in 1950., but since then it has declined five-fold to 32 per 1,000 in 2018. In the past five years infant mortality rates of malaria have dropped. According to a 2013 UNICEF report, 26% of women have undergone female genital mutilation.

Malaria is endemic throughout Senegal, and the entire population is at risk. Other significant infectious diseases include tuberculosis, schistosomiasis and hepatitis B, which is highly endemic, with an estimated 5.7–10% of the population being chronic carriers. Schistosomiasis remains particularly prevalent in the Senegal River basin. A study of schoolchildren found urinary schistosomiasis prevalence rates of 57.4% in the river delta, 32.5% in the valley and 25.1% in the upper basin. Other neglected tropical diseases endemic in the country include lymphatic filariasis, soil-transmitted helminthiasis and trachoma. Senegal experiences periodic outbreaks of dengue fever, including a prolonged outbreak between January 2025 and February 2026.

In June 2021, the Agency for Universal Health launched SunuCMU, a website that the agency hopes will streamline health care in the country. The website is a part of the Minister of State Mohammad Abdallah Dionne's plan for digitalization. He aims to make Senegal's health care system effective and sustainable.

=== Education ===
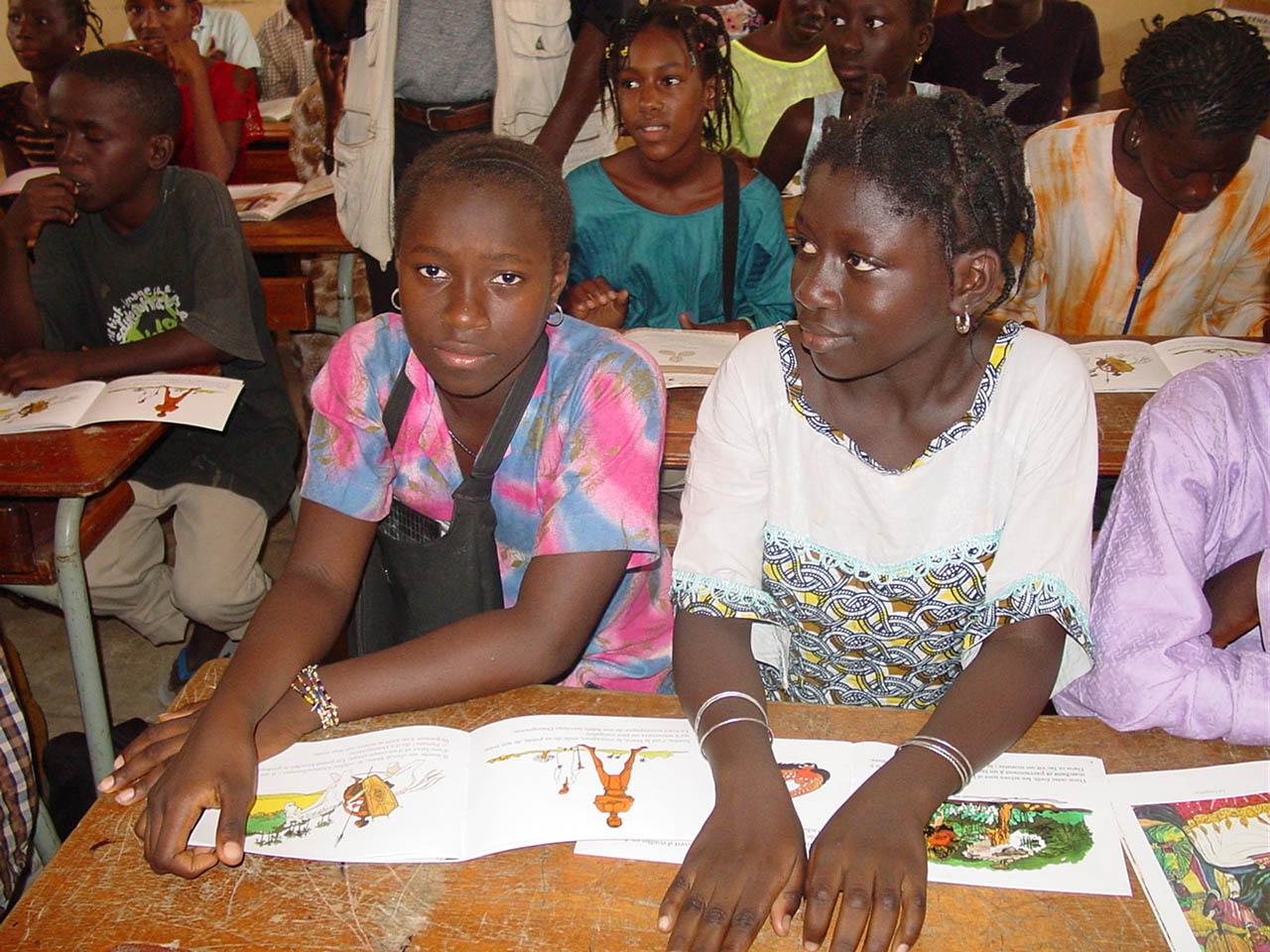
Students in Senegal

Articles 21 and 22 of the constitution guarantee access to education for all children. Education is compulsory and free up to age 16. The Ministry of Labor has indicated that the public school system is unable to cope with the number of children that must enroll each year. The net primary enrollment rate was 69 percent in 2005. In the fiscal year 2025, 3.5 percent of the budget was allocated for the Ministry of Education. Public expenditure on education was 5.4 percent of the 2002–2005 GDP. Senegal was ranked 89th in the Global Innovation Index in 2025. Illiteracy is high, particularly among women.

== Culture ==
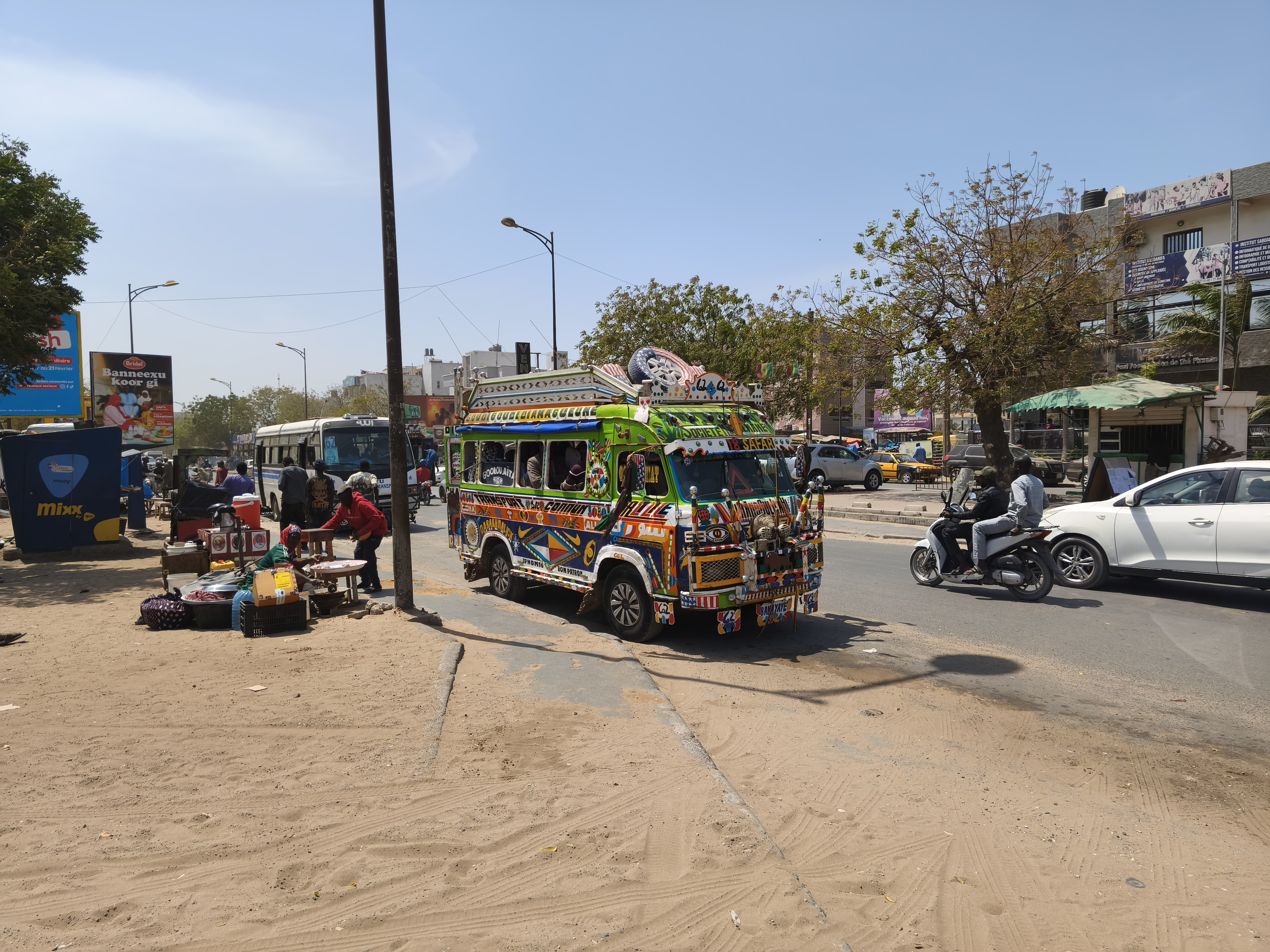
A jingle share taxi in Dakar, 2026

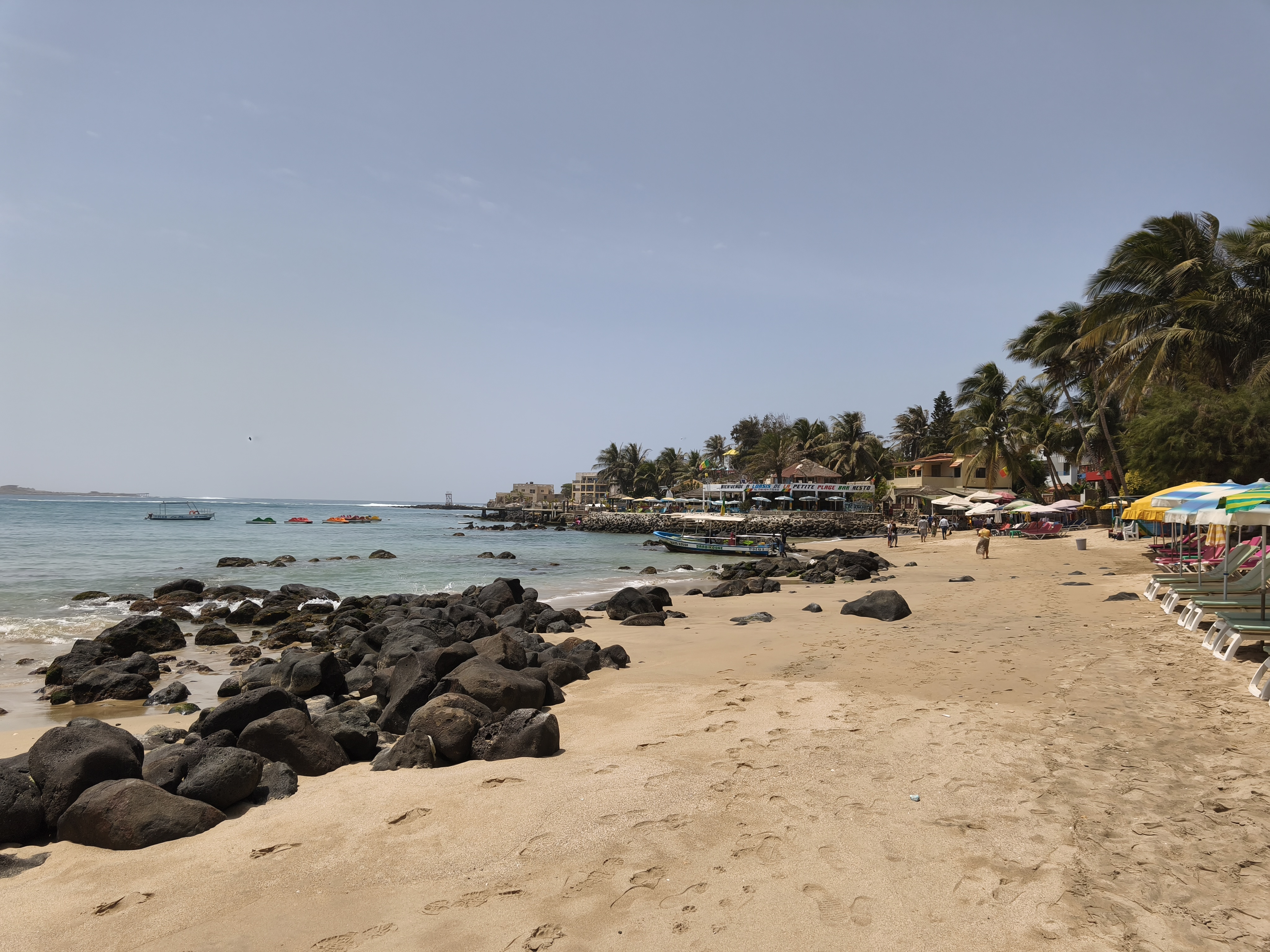
Ngor Island

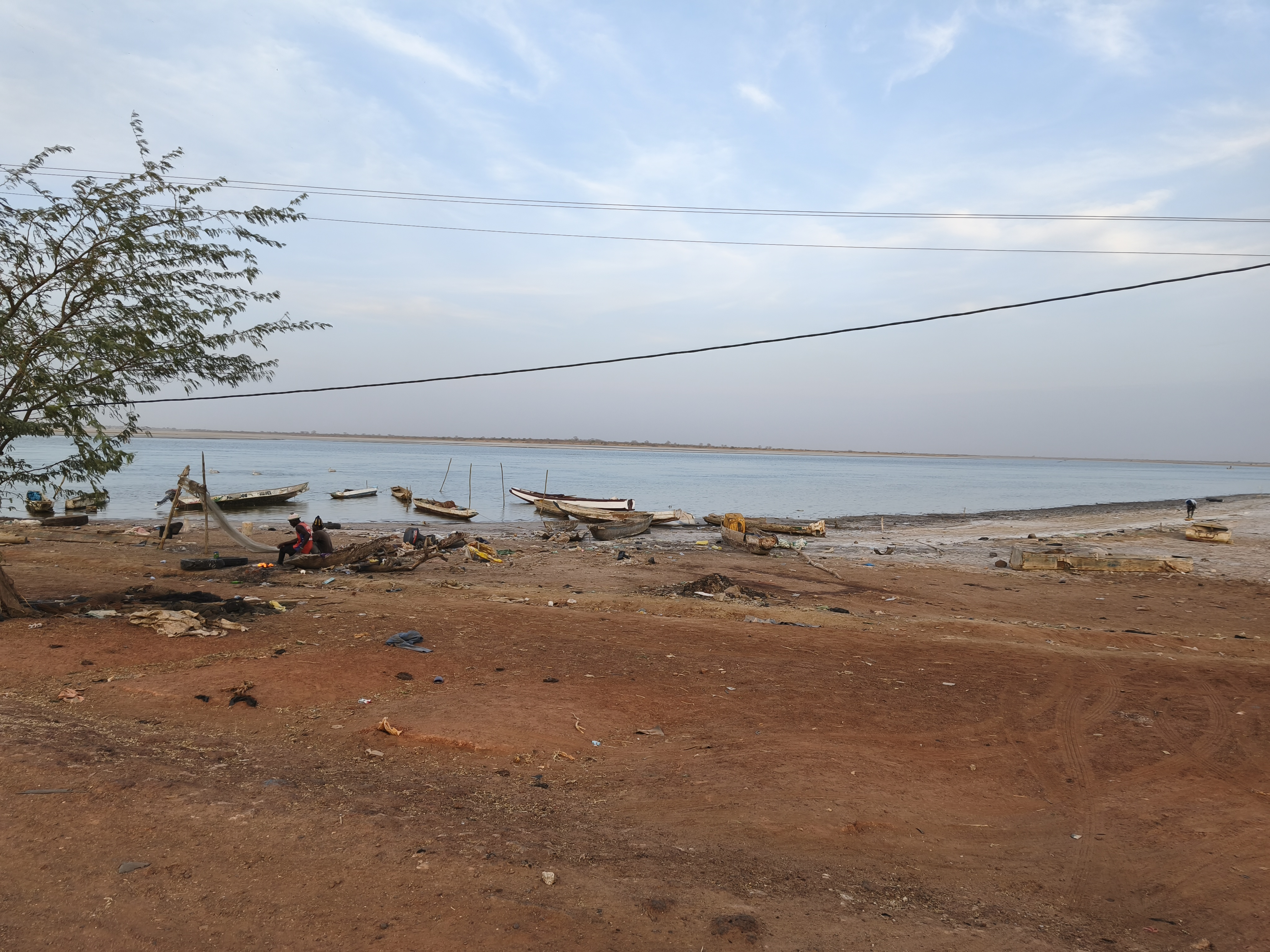
Landscape near Kaolack

Senegal is well known for the West African tradition of storytelling, performed by griots who have kept West African history alive for thousands of years through words and music. The griot profession is passed down generation to generation and requires years of training and apprenticeship in genealogy, history, and music. Griots give voice to generations of West African society.

The African Renaissance Monument, built in 2010 in Dakar, is the tallest statue in Africa. Dakar hosts the film festival Recidak. The Islamic festival of Eid al-Adha, known locally as Tabaski, is popularly celebrated. Despite being predominantly Muslim, the Christian celebration of Christmas is widely observed, with Christmas trees and decorations lining the streets of Dakar.

=== Cuisine ===
Because Senegal borders the Atlantic Ocean, fish is very important. Chicken, lamb, peas, eggs, and beef are also used in Senegalese cooking, but not pork, due to the nation's essentially Muslim population. Peanuts, the primary crop, as well as couscous, white rice, sweet potatoes, lentils, black-eyed peas, and various vegetables, are incorporated into many recipes. Meats and vegetables are typically stewed or marinated in herbs and spices, then served over rice or couscous or with bread.

Popular fresh juices are made from bissap, ginger, buoy (pronounced 'buoy', which is the fruit of the baobab tree, also known as "monkey bread fruit"), mango, or other fruit or wild trees (most famously soursop, which is called corossol in French). Desserts are vibrant and sweet, combining native ingredients with the extravagance and style characteristic of French influence on Senegal's culinary traditions. They are often served with fresh fruit and are traditionally followed by coffee or tea.

=== Music ===
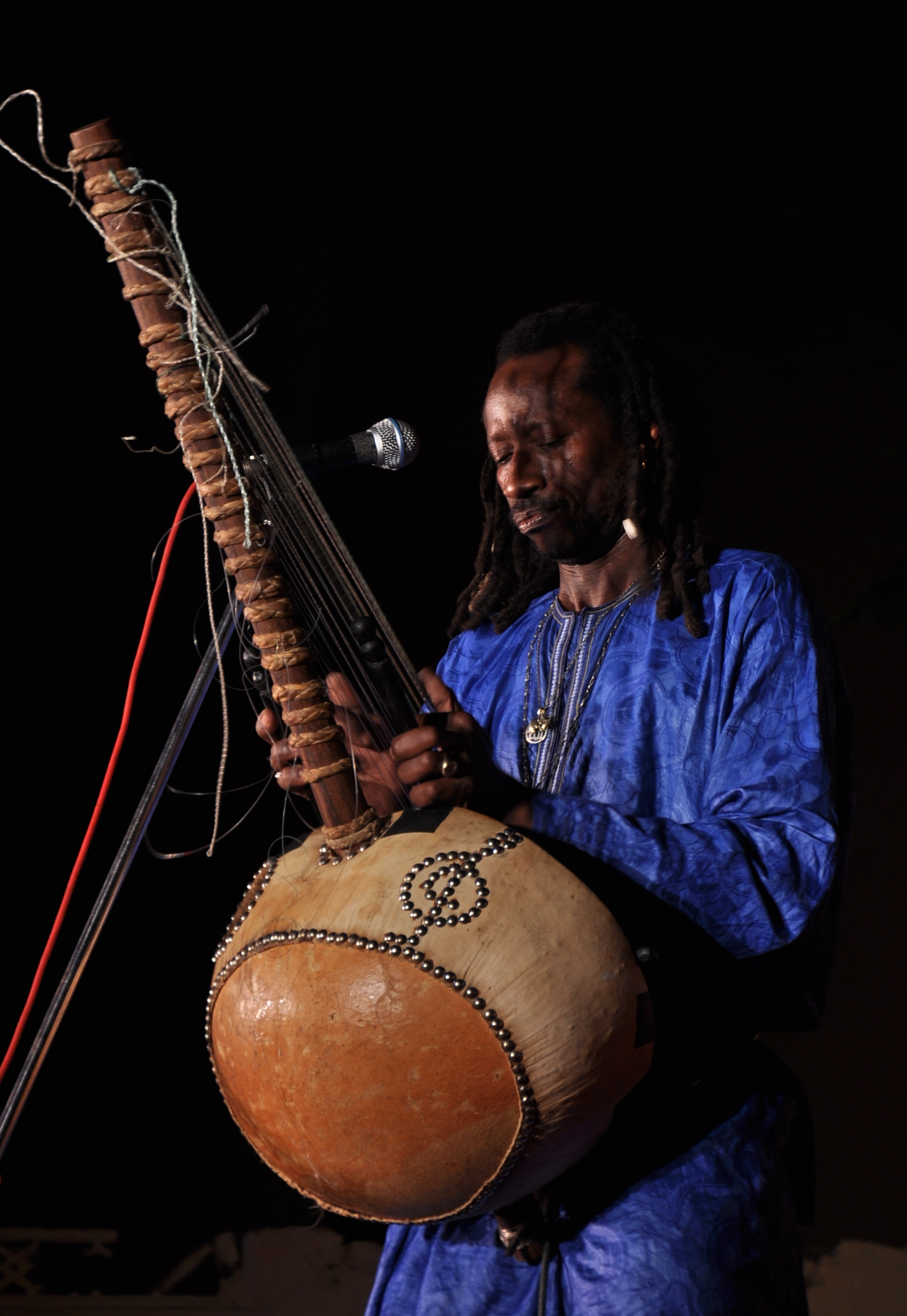
Kora player from Senegal

Senegal is known across Africa for its musical roots, due to the popularity of mbalax, which originated from the Serer percussive tradition, especially the Njuup, it has been popularized by Youssou N'Dour, Omar Pene, and others. Sabar drumming is especially popular. The sabar is mostly used in special celebrations such as weddings. Another instrument, the tama, is used in more ethnic groups. Other popular international renowned Senegalese musicians are Ismael Lô, Cheikh Lô, Orchestra Baobab, Baaba Maal, Akon (US-born), Thione Seck, Viviane, Fallou Dieng, Titi, Seckou Keita, Wasis Diop, and Pape Diouf.

=== Hospitality ===
Hospitality, in theory, is highly valued and is widely considered part of national identity. The Wolof word for hospitality is "teranga," and it is so identified with the pride of Senegal that the national football team is known as Les Lions de la Téranga. Senegal hosted the 2026 Summer Youth Olympics in Dakar, making Senegal the first African country to host an Olympic event.

=== Sport ===
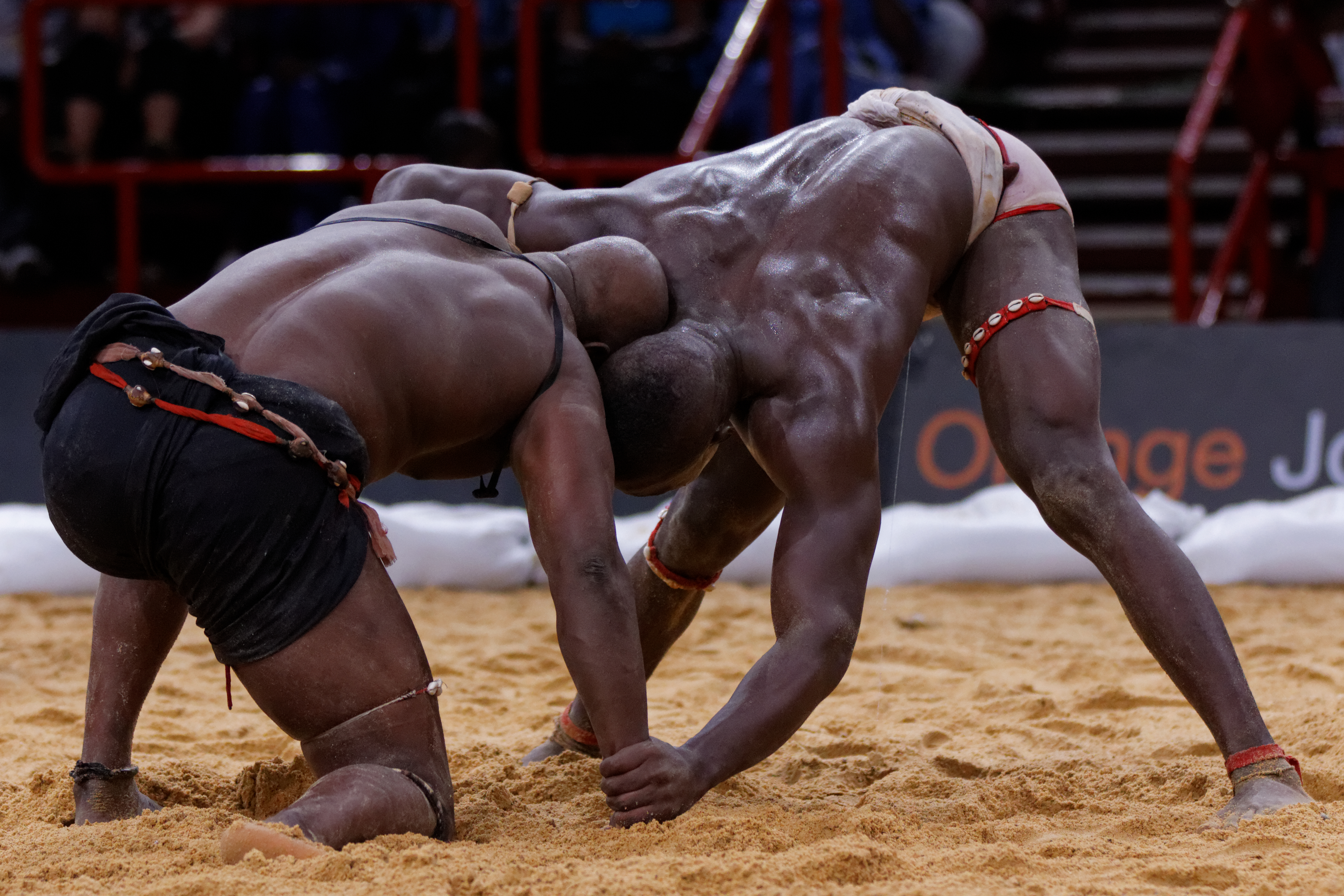
Senegalese Wrestling

Wrestling and football are the most popular sports. Senegalese wrestling is the most popular sport and has become a national obsession. It traditionally serves many young men to escape poverty. It is the only sport recognized as developed independently of Western culture. In 2022, the Senegal national football team beat Egypt to win the Africa Cup of Nations for the first time. They were runners-up in 2002, 2019 and 2025. They became one of only four African teams to ever reach the quarter-finals of the FIFA World Cup, defeating holders France in their first game in 2002. Senegal qualified for the 2018 FIFA World Cup in Russia, for the 2022 FIFA World Cup in Qatar, and for the 2026 FIFA World Cup in Canada/Mexico/USA.

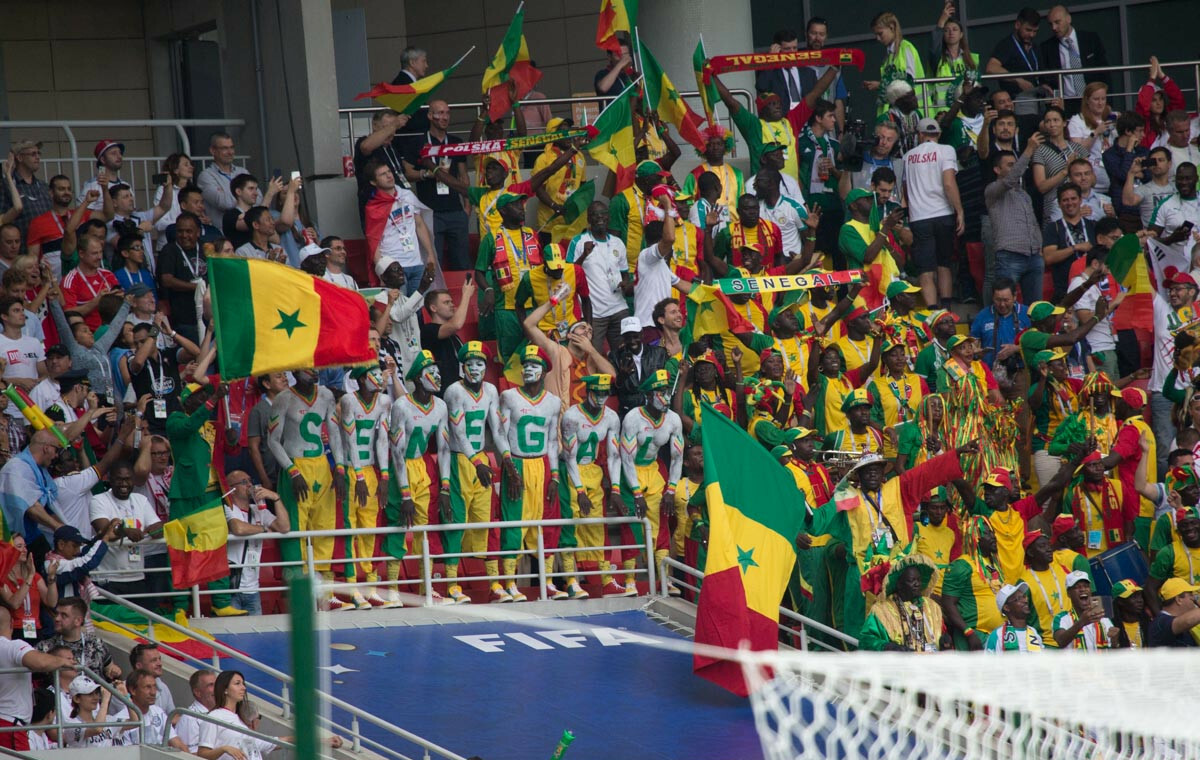
Senegalese football fans at the 2018 FIFA World Cup in Russia

Senegal has traditionally been one of Africa's dominant basketball powers. The men's team performed better than any other African nation at the 2014 FIBA World Cup, reaching the playoffs for the first time. The women's team won 19 medals at 20 African Championships, more than twice as many medals as any competitor. When the country hosted the 2019 FIBA Women's AfroBasket, 15,000 fans flocked to the Dakar Arena which is registered as a record attendance for basketball in Africa. Senegal was one of the continent's pioneers in basketball as it established one of Africa's first competitive leagues. In 2016, the NBA announced the launch of an Elite Academy in Senegal.

The country hosted the Paris–Dakar rally from 1979 until 2007. The Dakar Rally was an off-road endurance motorsport race that ran from Paris to Dakar. The competitors used off-road vehicles to cross the difficult terrain. The last race was held in 2007, before the 2008 rally was canceled a day before the event due to security concerns in Mauritania. The 2021 Ocean X-Prix of the electric off-road championship Extreme E was hosted in Senegal.

== See also ==
- Outline of Senegal
