= Morocco–Senegal relations =

- Morocco: Senegal

Morocco–Senegal relations are the bilateral relations between Morocco and Senegal. The two countries established diplomatic relations on November 15, 1960. The first visit by King Mohammed VI to Senegal took place in 2001, giving a strong boost and real substance to the cooperative relations in priority development areas between the two countries, such as agriculture, fishing, education and training, health, water management, irrigation, telecommunications, urban planning, air transport, and basic infrastructure. Since then, King Mohammed VI's visits to Senegal have continued in the years 2004, 2005, 2006, 2008, 2013, and 2015, underscoring the great importance Morocco places on developing its relations with Senegal. Both countries are members of the African Union and Non-Aligned Movement.

== History ==
On July 6, 2020, King Mohammed VI appointed a new ambassador to Senegal, Al Hassan Naciri.

On March 26, 2024, King Mohammed VI sent a congratulatory message to newly elected President Bassirou Diomaye Faye of the Republic of Senegal.

On April 2, 2024, Prime Minister Aziz Akhannouch represented King Mohammed VI, accompanied by Nasser Bourita, Minister of Foreign Affairs and Cooperation, at the swearing-in and inauguration ceremony of newly elected President Bassirou Diomaye Faye of the Republic of Senegal, held in Diamniadio near Dakar. The visit followed an invitation extended by the Senegalese president to the Moroccan monarch for the ceremony. King Mohammed VI was the only head of state from outside the region invited to the event.

On May 27, 2024, discussions were held between the Minister of Foreign Affairs, African Cooperation and Moroccan Expatriates, Nasser Bourita, and Yassine Fall, who made her first visit to the Kingdom as Senegal's Minister of African Integration and Foreign Affairs. During the visit, the Republic of Senegal reaffirmed, through its Minister of African Integration and Foreign Affairs, its "permanent and unwavering" support for the territorial integrity and sovereignty of Morocco over all its territories, including the Moroccan Sahara.

== Resident diplomatic missions ==
- Morocco has an embassy in Dakar.
- Senegal has an embassy in Rabat.

== See also ==
- Foreign relations of Morocco
- Foreign relations of Senegal
