= Aboubacry Moussa Lam =

Senegalese historian (b. 1953)

Aboubacry Moussa Lam, also known as Boubacar Lam, was born in 1953 and is a Peul Senegalese historian, disciple of Cheikh Anta Diop, who was his primary advisor on his major work, De l'Origine Égyptienne des Peuls, and a professor of Egyptology in the Department of History at the Cheikh Anta Diop University. Lam has been credited with being the most important Diop scholar and being "most helpful and inspiring in defining the nature of the Afrocentric school of thought." Boubacar has been active in seeking to recenter Africans back in their own historical and social context. Lam was also a signatory to an appeal to preserve the Timbuktu Manuscripts. In January 2018, he was listed as a writer and lecturer at Dakar University as well as a participant in the Association for the Development of Education in Africa (ADEA)'s and the Global Book Alliance (GBA)'s African Publishers and Other Book Industry Stakeholders Regional Meeting.

The primary focus of Lam's work has been on Cheikh Anta Diop's migrations theory. Continuing the African intellectual tradition of Africana Studies, Lam has used his linguistic skills for the purpose of translation and to assist in the recovery of African memory. His linguistic work has helped establish connections between the ancient Egyptian language and black African languages, primarily Kongo-Saharan languages. In particular, much of his work has focused on the cultural and linguistic similarities between West Africans (e.g., Peul, Serer, Wolof) and ancient Egypt. His research and demonstration of the Nile origin of the Peul has exampled the possibility of interactions between Africans in the western and eastern Sahel. He has also made the case for km.t deriving from the skin color of Nile Valley Africans, who are viewed as black.

== Selected works ==
- Les chemins du Nil : les relations entre l'Egypte ancienne et l'Afrique
- De l'origine égyptienne des Peuls
- La fièvre de la terre
- Le Sahara ou la vallée du Nil? : aperçu sur la problématique du berceau de l'unité culturelle de l'Afrique Noire
- L'affaire des momies royales : la vérité sur la reine Ahmès-Nefertari
- Le triomphe de Maât
- L'unité culturelle égypto-africaine à travers les formes et les fonctions de l'appui-tête
- Paalel njuumri
- Fulb̳e : gila Héli-e-Yooyo haa Fuuta-Tooro
- Hieroglyphics for Babies
