= United to Boost Senegal =

Political coalition in Senegal

United to Boost Senegal (Wolof: Bennoo Siggil Senegaal, BSS) is a Senegalese political coalition. It was active in the 22 March 2009 Municipal elections in that country. The coalition was made up of members of parties opposed to President Abdoulaye Wade's ruling Senegalese Democratic Party (Parti Démocratique Sénégalais) and its Sopi Coalition. Coalition partners included the Socialist Party of Senegal, Alliance of the Forces of Progress, Front for Socialism and Democracy/Benno Jubël, and Reform Movement for Social Development. Prominent BSS members include Khalifa Sall, Biram Sassoum Sy, Doudou Issa Niasse, and Haoua Dia Thiam. The party's colours are Green and Yellow.

== March 2009 elections ==
The party scored victories in the 2009 elections, including the election of former PS government minister Khalifa Sall as Mayor of Dakar and Fsd/Bj Secretary General Cheikh Bamba Dièye as Mayor of Saint-Louis. BSS candidates won local seats across Senegal, including Joal-Fadiouth: in M'bour Department the BSS candidates won 12 of 16 local councils. Prominent PS coalition members won mayoral races in Yène, Louga, Mermoz-Sacré Cœur, Podor and Kaffrine. In the run up to the elections, splits appeared in the BSS coalition, with non-PS candidates such as MRDS member Imam Mbaye Niang breaking with the PS.
