= 2007 Senegalese Senate election =

19 August 2007

All 35 seats in the Senate 18 seats needed for a majority
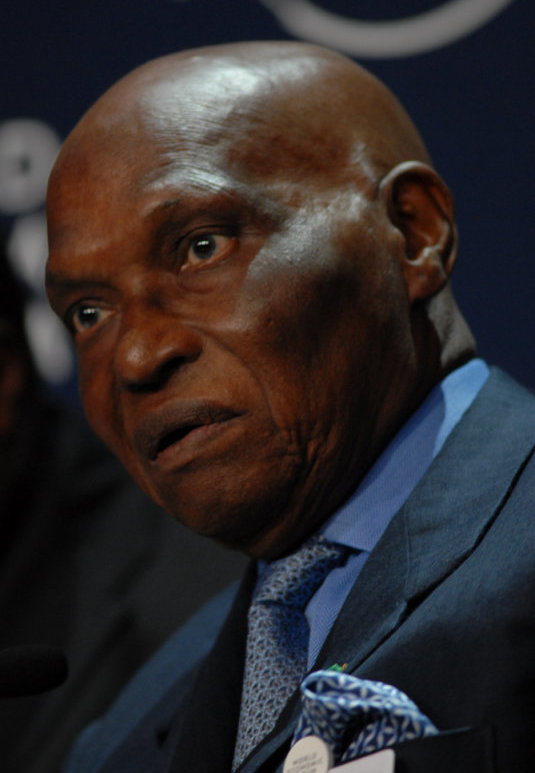

	Majority party	Minority party
Leader	Abdoulaye Wade	Landing Savané
Party	PDS	And-Jëf
Seats won	34	1
Popular vote	8,177	736
Percentage	86.17%	7.76%

Indirect Senate elections were held in Senegal on 19 August 2007. Over 13,000 MPs, local and municipal councillors were eligible to vote in this election, in which 35 of the Senate's 100 members were chosen across the country's 35 districts; President Abdoulaye Wade nominated the other 65 members.

Unlike other elections held in Senegal since 2000, the Senegalese Democratic Party (PDS) of President Wade did not take part in the election as part of the Sopi Coalition, but instead ran independently. The PDS received 8,177 of the 9,624 valid votes, a majority of 85%, and won all but one of the seats. Turnout was 73.3%, with 9,815 of the eligible 13,384 voters participating; 191 of the votes were deemed invalid. The single seat not won by the PDS was the seat from Vélingara Department; it was won by And-Jëf/African Party for Democracy and Socialism (AJ/PADS). AJ/PADS received 736 total votes, the second highest number. Five other groups participated but did not win seats: the Union of Democratic Forces (UFD) received 251 votes, the Authentic Socialist Party (PSA) won 134 votes, the Bloc of Gaïndé Centrists (BCG) won 44 votes, Taaru Sénégal–Taaru Afrik/Movement for Self-Management Socialism (TS–TA/MSA) won 40 votes, and the Bloc for the Reinforcement of Democracy in Senegal (BRDS) won 7 votes. Most of the main opposition parties boycotted the senatorial election, as they did the June 2007 National Assembly election.

The results were confirmed by the Constitutional Council on August 28, 2007, and the Senate was installed on September 26. Former National Assembly President Pape Diop, one of the appointed Senators, was elected President of the Senate on October 3, receiving the votes of 99 of the 100 Senators.

== Results ==
Party	Votes	%	Seats
Senegalese Democratic Party	8,177	86.17	34
And-Jëf/African Party for Democracy and Socialism	736	7.76	1
Union of Democratic Forces	251	2.65	0
Authentic Socialist Party	234	2.47	0
Bloc of Gaïndé Centrists	44	0.46	0
Taaru Sénégal–Taaru Afrik/Movement for Self-Management Socialism	40	0.42	0
Bloc for the Reinforcement of Democracy in Senegal	7	0.07	0
Total	9,489	100.00	35
Valid votes	9,489	96.68	
Invalid/blank votes	326	3.32	
Total votes	9,815	100.00	
Registered voters/turnout	13,384	73.33	
Source: African Elections Database
