= Robert Sagna =

Senegalese politician

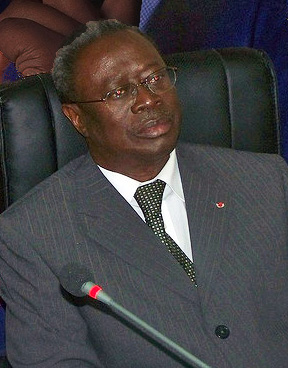
- Sagna in 2009

Mayor of Ziguinchor
- In office December 1984 – April 18, 2009
- Succeeded by: Abdoulaye Baldé

Member of the National Assembly of Senegal
- In office June 2007 – –

Personal details
- Born: April 17, 1939 (age 86) Ziguinchor, Senegal
- Party: Rally for Socialism and Democracy / Takku Defaraat Senegal
- Other political affiliations: Socialist Party (until 2007)
- Profession: Politician

Robert Sagna (born April 17, 1939) is a Senegalese politician who served in the government of Senegal from 1978 to 2000 and was mayor of Ziguinchor from 1984 to 2009. He was elected to the National Assembly of Senegal in 2007.

== Biography ==
Sagna was born in Ziguinchor. Unusually for Senegal, where a large majority of the population is Muslim, Sagna is a Christian. During the presidencies of Léopold Sédar Senghor and Abdou Diouf, he served in the government as Secretary of State for Human Promotion from 1978 to 1980, Secretary of State for Maritime Fishing from 1980 to 1983, Minister of Equipment from 1983 to 1988, Minister of Tourism from 1987 to 1988, Minister of Information for the Sénégambia Confederation from 1988 to 1989, Minister of Communication from 1988 to 1990, Minister of Equipment, Transport and the Sea from 1991 to 1993, and Minister of State for Agriculture from 1993 to 2000. He also became Mayor of Ziguinchor in December 1984. He was a PS candidate in Ziguinchor in the April 2001 parliamentary election, but failed to win a seat.

Sagna, part of a movement within the Socialist Party called "Democracy and Solidarity", opposed the 2007 presidential candidacy of the party's First Secretary, Ousmane Tanor Dieng. Sagna stood as the candidate of the coalition Takku Defaraat Sénégal in the February 2007 presidential election. He took fifth place with 2.58% of the vote, and lost to incumbent President Abdoulaye Wade, who won a majority in the first round, in his own home base of Ziguinchor. After the election, Sagna said that Wade had been freely elected and that he would not challenge the results.

He was one of three candidates of Takku Defaraat Sénégal to be elected to the National Assembly in the June 2007 parliamentary election, through national list proportional representation.

Wade's Sopi Coalition won the March 2009 local election in Ziguinchor. Sagna was accordingly succeeded as Mayor by Abdoulaye Baldé on April 18, 2009. On this occasion, Baldé said that he would propose to the municipal council that Sagna be designated as the Honorary Mayor of Ziguinchor; Sagna described this as a magnanimous gesture and thanked Baldé.

As leader of the Rally for Socialism and Democracy/Takku Defaraat Senegal, Sagna supported Macky Sall, who was elected as President in 2012. Under Sall's presidency he played a key role in working to secure peace in Casamance, as well as bolstering Sall's support in the region, although he did not receive an official post. He expressed his party's continuing support for President Sall in July 2016.
