= 2007 Senegalese presidential election =

- 25 February 2007
- Turnout: 70.62% (▲9.87 pp)
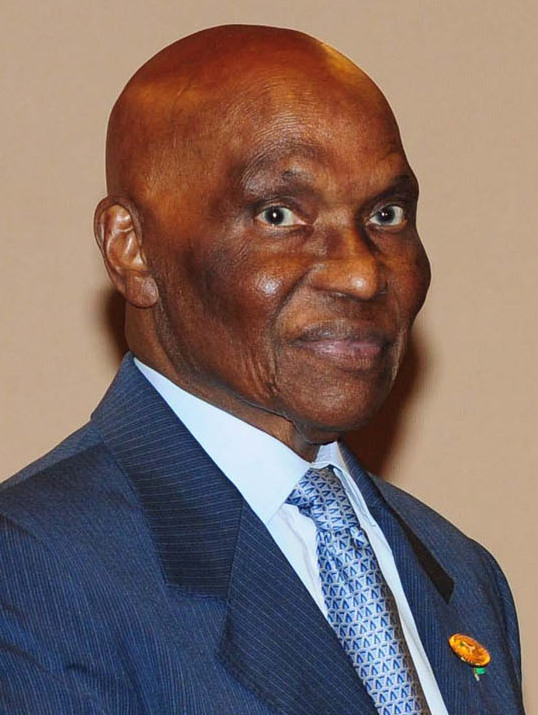

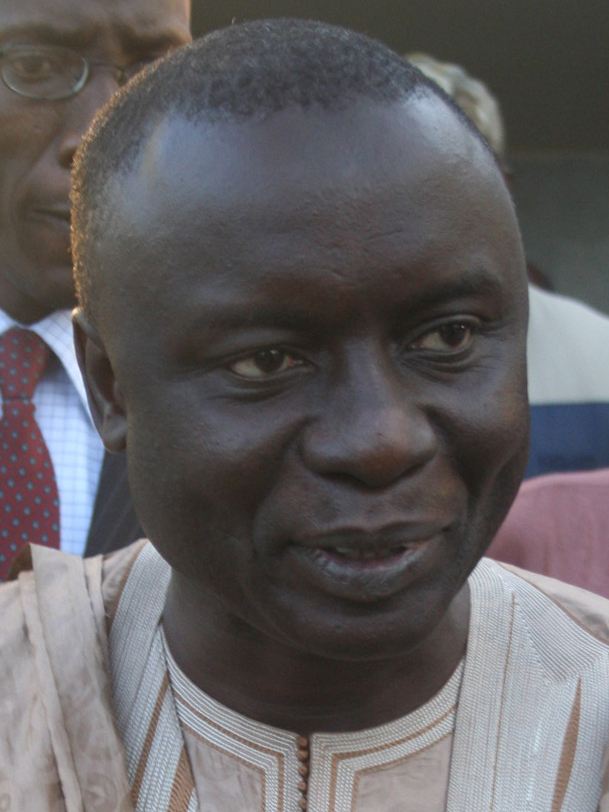

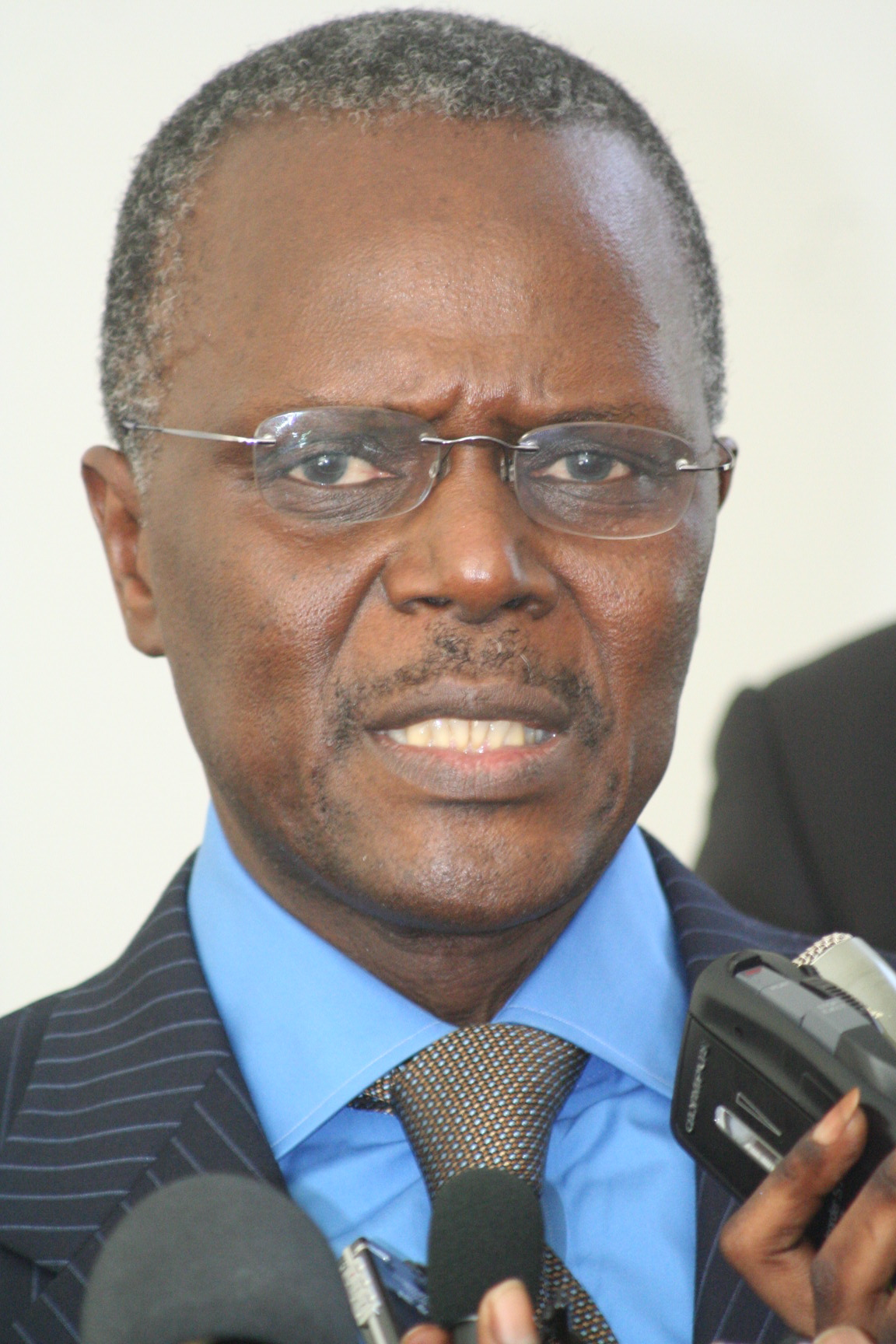

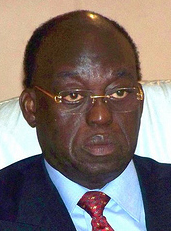
Candidate	Abdoulaye Wade	Idrissa Seck
Party	PDS	Rewmi
Popular vote	1,914,403	510,922
Percentage	55.90%	14.92%
Candidate	Ousmane Tanor Dieng	Moustapha Niasse
Party	PS	AFP
Popular vote	464,287	203,129
Percentage	13.56%	5.93%
President before election
Abdoulaye Wade
PDS
Elected President
Abdoulaye Wade
PDS

Presidential elections were held in Senegal on 25 February 2007. Incumbent president Abdoulaye Wade was re-elected in the first round with almost 56% of the vote.

== Background ==
Wade announced the date for the election on 13 April 2006. The election campaign officially began on 4 February 2007. Soldiers voted early on 17 February and 18 February; this was the first time in the country's history that soldiers were allowed to vote.

Had a run-off been necessary, it would have been held on 18 March 2007. A parliamentary election was initially intended to be held on 25 February as well, but it was delayed to 3 June 2007.

== Candidates ==
15 candidates ran for President, including Wade. Wade was nominated as the presidential candidate of his party, the Senegalese Democratic Party (PDS), on 15 October 2006. Idrissa Seck, a former Prime Minister who was once considered Wade's protégé, also ran. Seck announced his candidacy for President in April 2006; he had been arrested in 2005 on charges of embezzlement and threatening state security but never faced a trial and was eventually released in February 2006. On January 22, 2007, Wade said that Seck had agreed to return to the ruling PDS; Seck subsequently confirmed this, but said that he would remain a presidential candidate. If he had withdrawn his candidacy, the law would have required that the election be delayed, but shortly afterwards the National Assembly voted to change the law so that a delay would not be necessary in the event of a candidate's withdrawal.

Ousmane Tanor Dieng ran as the candidate of the former ruling Socialist Party (PS). Former Prime Minister Moustapha Niasse ran as the candidate of a coalition of opposition parties, including his own Alliance of the Forces of Progress (AFP). Other candidates included Abdoulaye Bathily of the Democratic League/Movement for the Labour Party (LD/MPT), Landing Savané, a Minister of State and the Secretary-General of And-Jëf/African Party for Democracy and Socialism (AJ/PADS), Ziguinchor Mayor Robert Sagna, and former ambassador Modou Dia.

== Campaign ==
Wade faced criticism over a variety of issues, including unemployment and the continuing Casamance conflict, as well as alleged corruption and the delays of the parliamentary election. Major construction projects undertaken by Wade split opinion in the country. Wade's campaign called for the people to give him a majority of the vote in the first round, but it was widely expected that a second round would be necessary, and Wade's opponents denied the possibility that he could legitimately win a first-round majority. Many politicians who had backed Wade in 2000 had since turned against him, which could be viewed as making it improbable that Wade would do as well in 2007; on the other hand, it has been pointed out that Senegal's demographics, with a high proportion of young people in the electorate, could make it difficult to compare the two elections.

== Results ==
Shortly after the election was held, Prime Minister Macky Sall, who was also Wade's campaign manager, said that Wade had won the election in the first round with about 57% of the vote, based on initial results. According to results announced on 1 March, Wade won about 1.9 million votes, about 55.9% of the total. Seck was in second place with 14.9% of the vote and Tanor Dieng was in third place with 13.6%. Voter turnout was said to be 70.5%. Wade won the most votes in 32 out of 34 of the country's departments, including a majority in 28 of them. Seck won the department of Thiès and Niasse won the department of Nioro.

Abdoulaye Bathily's campaign rejected the results and alleged that there were flaws in the voting, saying that a person could be registered more than once, and that the ink used in voting, which was supposed to be indelible, could be washed off. Ousmane Tanor Dieng's spokesperson also rejected the results, and on 5 March Dieng filed a Constitutional Court appeal regarding alleged lack of transparency and irregularities.

Final results from the Constitutional Council on 11 March gave Wade 55.90%, Seck 14.92%, and Dieng 13.56%. The Council rejected appeals from Dieng and Bathily. Wade was sworn in on 3 April at the Leopold Sedar Senghor Stadium in Dakar, with many African leaders and about 60,000 spectators in attendance.

Candidate	Party	Votes	%
Abdoulaye Wade	Senegalese Democratic Party	1,914,403	55.90
Idrissa Seck	Rewmi	510,922	14.92
Ousmane Tanor Dieng	Socialist Party	464,287	13.56
Moustapha Niasse	Alliance of the Forces of Progress	203,129	5.93
Robert Sagna	Takku Defaraat Sénégal	88,446	2.58
Abdoulaye Bathily	Democratic League/Movement for the Labour Party	75,797	2.21
Landing Savané	And-Jëf/African Party for Democracy and Socialism	70,780	2.07
Talla Sylla	Alliance for Progress and Justice/Jëf-Jël	18,022	0.53
Cheikh Bamba Dièye	Front for Socialism and Democracy/Benno Jubël	17,233	0.50
Mamadou Lamine Diallo	Tekki Taaru Sénégal	16,570	0.48
Mama Adama Guèye	Independent	13,700	0.40
Doudou Ndoye	Union for the Republic	9,918	0.29
Alioune Mbaye	Independent	9,016	0.26
Louis Jacques Senghor	Liberal Movement for the Senegalese People	8,212	0.24
Modou Dia	Independent	4,491	0.13
Total		3,424,926	100.00
Valid votes		3,424,926	98.62
Invalid/blank votes		47,786	1.38
Total votes		3,472,712	100.00
Registered voters/turnout		4,917,157	70.62
Source: Direction Générale des Élections
