= Abdoulaye Bathily =

Senegalese politician and diplomat

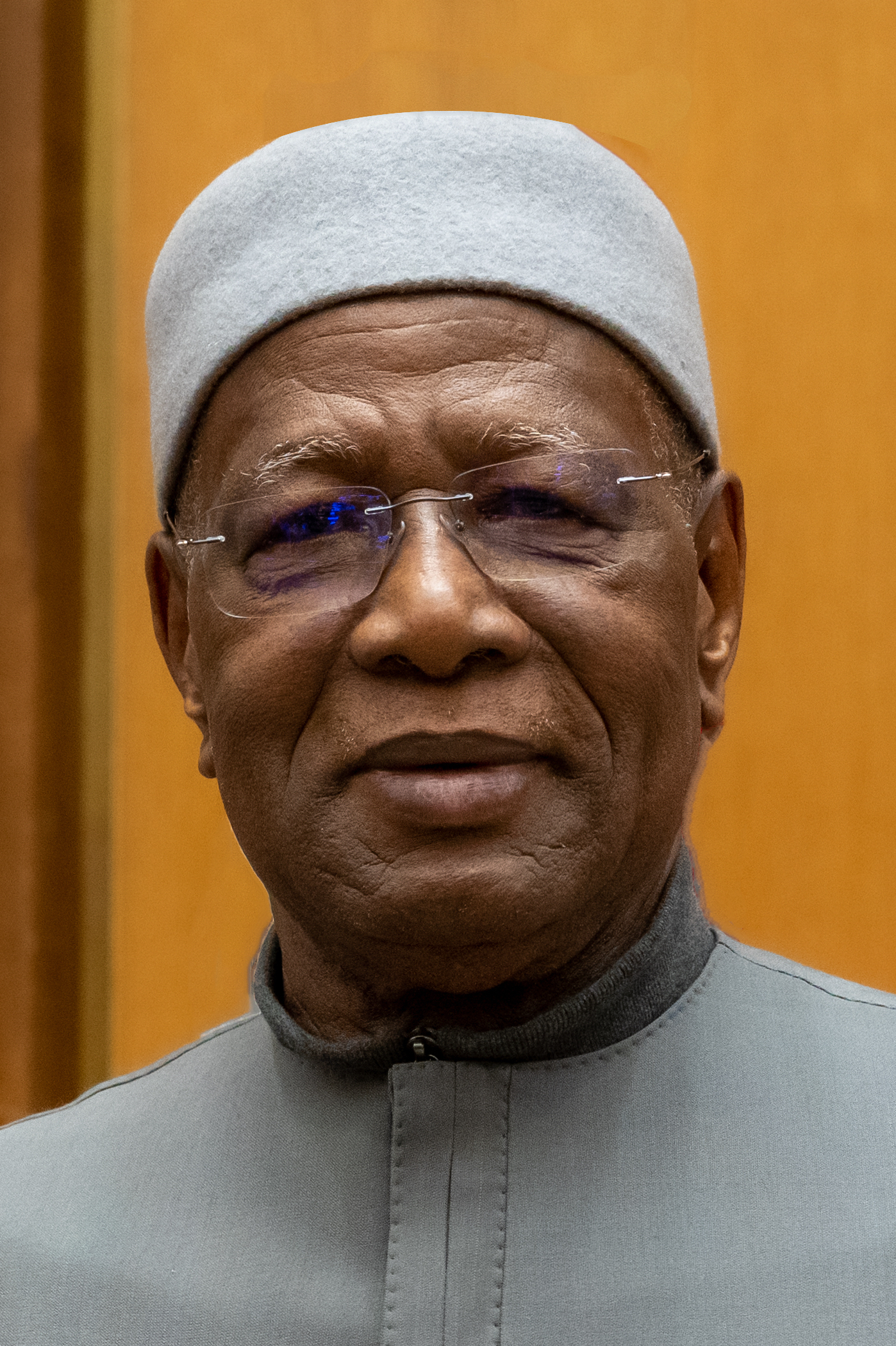

Special Representative and Head of the United Nations Support Mission in Libya
- In office 2 Septembre 2022 – 2 April 2024
- Preceded by: Stephanie Turco Williams (Acting)
- Succeeded by: Hanna Tetteh

Personal details
- Born: 1947 (age 78–79) Tiyabu, Senegal
- Party: Democratic League/Movement for the Labour Party

Abdoulaye Bathily (born 1947) is a Senegalese politician and diplomat. Bathily, the long-time Secretary-General of the Democratic League/Movement for the Labour Party (LD/MPT), served in the government of Senegal as Minister of the Environment from 1993 to 1998 and as Minister of Energy from 2000 to 2001. Later, he worked as a diplomat for the United Nations, and since 2014 he has been Special Representative of the United Nations Secretary-General for Central Africa.

== Early life and education ==
Bathily was born in Tiyabu in Bakel Department.

He holds a PhD from the University of Birmingham and Doctor of State from University Cheikh Anta Diop. He has written and published multiple works on African history and politics, including Mai 68 à Dakar la révolte universitaire et la Démocratie in 1992 and The Military and Militarism in Africa (co-edited with Eboe Hutchful) in 1998.

=== Politics ===
After serving as the Third Secretary of the Democratic League in charge of the press and external relations, he was elected as the party's Secretary-General at its First Congress on 6–7 April 1984, succeeding Babacar Sané. He was the LD/MPT's candidate in the February 1993 presidential election, taking fourth place with 2.41% of the vote. In the February 1993 parliamentary election, he was elected to the National Assembly; he then served as Minister for the Environment and the Protection of Nature from 1993 to 1998 under President Abdou Diouf.

Bathily was re-elected to the National Assembly in the 1998 parliamentary election. He and the LD/MPT backed opposition candidate Abdoulaye Wade in the 2000 presidential election, and following Wade's victory Bathily was named Minister of Energy and Hydraulics in April 2000, remaining in that post until May 2001. He was again elected to the National Assembly of Senegal in the April 2001 parliamentary election from Bakel Department as a candidate of the ruling Sopi Coalition, and he became the Third Vice-president of the National Assembly. Subsequently, the LD/MPT grew increasingly at odds with Wade, and Bathily led a vote in the National Assembly against an amnesty for individuals implicated in the 1993 killing of Constitutional Council Vice-president Babacar Sèye. Wade dismissed the LD/MPT ministers from the government in March 2005 and the party left the Sopi Coalition, going into opposition.

Bathily ran again in the February 2007 presidential election as the candidate of the Jubbanti Sénégal coalition, taking sixth place with 2.21% of the vote, according to official results. Bathily's campaign rejected the results and alleged that there were flaws in the voting, saying that a person could be registered more than once, and that the ink used in voting, which was supposed to be indelible, could be washed off. Along with Socialist Party candidate Ousmane Tanor Dieng, Bathily filed an appeal regarding the election, but their appeals were rejected by the Constitutional Council.

He was briefly detained by police in late January 2007, along with other opposition leaders, after participating in a banned protest regarding the delaying of parliamentary elections until June.

After the formation of a government that included Wade's son Karim on 1 May 2009, Bathily denounced Wade for running the country through "family management", and he said that "Senegal beats all records in terms of bad governance. I am ashamed of my country." In addition, he criticized plans to introduce the office of vice-president, saying that this office was unnecessary and senseless; he argued that it would merely be used by Wade "to ensure a monarchical succession".

Bathily supported opposition candidate Macky Sall in the 2012 presidential election. Sall won the election; a few months after taking office, he appointed Bathily as Minister of State at the Presidency on 1 August 2012.

== Diplomatic career ==
On 8 July 2013, United Nations Secretary-General Ban Ki-moon announced Bathily's appointment as his Deputy Special Representative in the United Nations Multidimensional Integrated Stabilization Mission in Mali (MINUSMA). Less than a year later, on 30 April 2014, Ban announced Bathily's appointment as his Special Representative for Central Africa and Head of the United Nations Regional Office for Central Africa (UNOCA) in Libreville, Gabon.

Prior to an opposition protest in Libreville on 20 December 2014, Bathily called for dialogue, warning of the potential for "a deep crisis".

In May 2015, Bathily presided over the Bangui National Forum, a national reconciliation conference organized by the transition government of the Central African Republic to bring together Central Africans from all regions and backgrounds to find lasting solutions to years of recurrent political instability in the country.

On 2 September 2022, UN Secretary-General António Guterres appointed Bathily as special envoy for Libya and head of the UN support mission, UNSMIL. He resigned from his position on 16 April 2024, citing a "lack of political will and good faith" by Libyan politicians.

== Other positions ==
Bathily is a distinguished member of the Advisory Board of NatureNews, Africa's foremost independent newspaper that is focused on Environment, Climate Change and Sustainable Earth.
