= 2004 in Senegal =

- Decades: 1980s; 1990s; 2000s; 2010s; 2020s
- See also: Other events of 2004; Timeline of Senegalese history

This article is a list of events in the year 2004 in Senegal.

== Incumbents ==
- President: Abdoulaye Wade
- Prime Minister: Idrissa Seck (until April 21), Macky Sall (from April 21)

== Events ==
=== December ===
- December 30 - President Wade signs a peace accord with rebels in the Casamance region after 22 years of war.

== Sports ==
- January: the 2004 Dakar Rally took place, finishing in Dakar
- ASC Diaraf won the Senegal Premier League football championship
