= Abdoulaye Baldé (politician) =

Senegalese politician

Abdoulaye Baldé (born 16 January 1964) is a Senegalese politician. He served as Secretary-General of the Presidency under Abdoulaye Wade, beginning in 2001, and he was elected as Mayor of Ziguinchor in 2009. He was a member of the Steering Committee of the Senegalese Democratic Party (PDS).

== Life and career ==
Baldé was born in Darsalam, located in Ziguinchor Region. He was Commissioner of Police and Head of the National Brigade of Economic and Financial Affairs at the Division of Criminal Investigations from July 1991 to April 1992. Subsequentlyو he was Chargé de mission at the Presidency as Deputy to the Head of the Bureau of Analysis and Orientation (BAO) from 1992 to 2000. Under President Abdoulaye Wade, Baldé was appointed as Secretary-General of the Presidency on 12 May 2001. Also under President Wade, Baldé served as Executive Director of the National Agency of the Organisation of the Islamic Conference.

In addition to being a member of the PDS Steering Committee, Baldé was the Secretary-General of the PDS Communal Section in Ziguinchor. The Sopi Coalition (which included the PDS) won the March 2009 local election in Ziguinchor. Baldé headed the Sopi candidate list and was subsequently elected as Mayor; he succeeded Robert Sagna on 18 April 2009. He was the Minister of Agriculture and Rural Equipment of Senegal until 2013 when he was succeeded by Papa Abdoulaye Seck.
