= Talla Sylla =

Senegalese politician (born 1966)

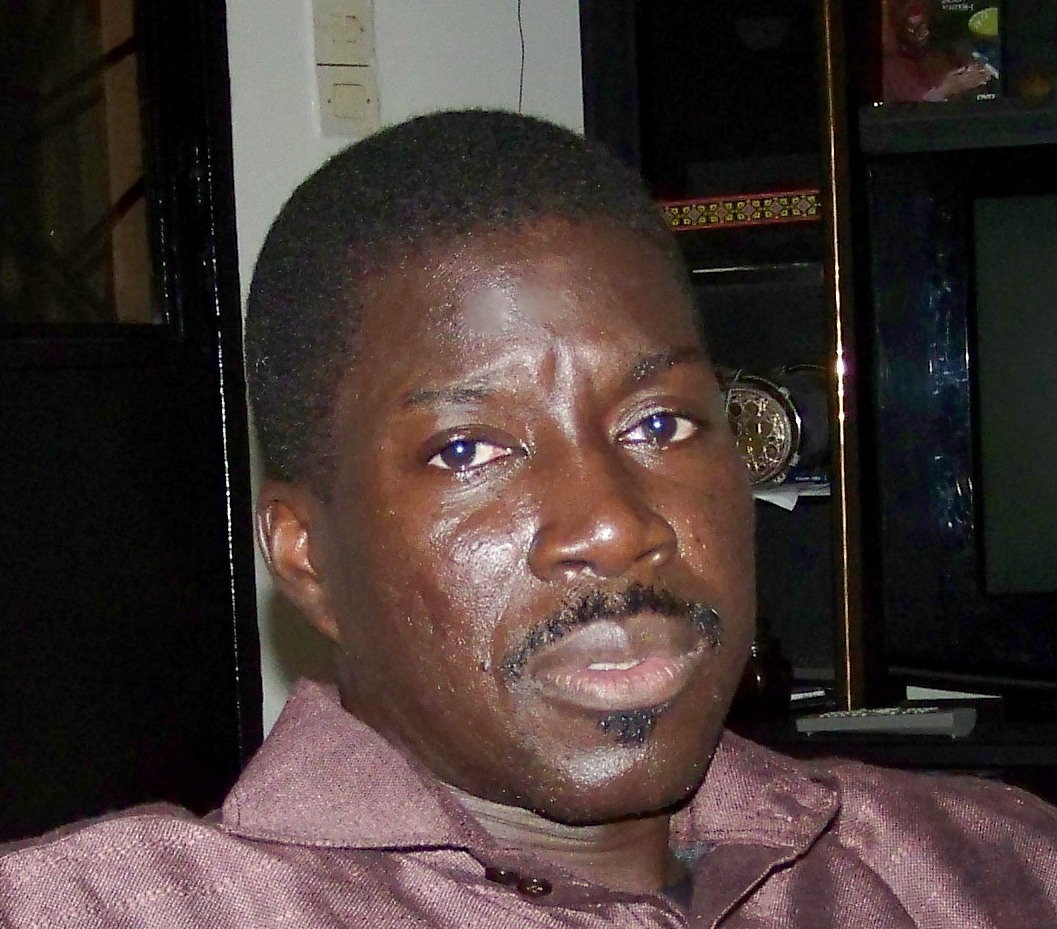

Mayor of Thiès
- In office 29 June 2014 – 23 January 2022
- Preceded by: Idrissa Seck
- Succeeded by: Babacar Diop

Personal details
- Born: 21 January 1966 (age 60)

Talla Sylla (born 21 January 1966) is a Senegalese politician and the leader of Action pour la Renaissance/Wallu Askanu Senegal (AR/WA Senegal). He was previously the leader of Alliance for Progress and Justice Jëf-Jël and was that party's candidate in the 2007 presidential election.

== Biography ==
Sylla was born in Pikine, in the outskirts of Dakar. Sylla joined the African Independence Party at the age of 14. He later entered the Cheikh Anta Diop University to study sociology. In October 1987 he was elected president of the Dakar Students Coordination (CED). The following year he led a students strike. In 1990, after another students strike, Sylla was expelled from UCAD. He then shifted to France, to continue his studies there. At the University of Grenoble he founded the Youth for Change (JPA) in 1991. When Sylla returned to Senegal in 1995, JPA was transformed into a political party, Jëf-Jël. In the April 2001 parliamentary election, Sylla was the sole Jëf-Jël candidate elected to the National Assembly. He later resigned from the National Assembly and was replaced by Moussa Tine.

Sylla was attacked and severely injured outside a restaurant in Dakar on October 5, 2003, and was hospitalized as a result. He was subsequently taken to Paris for further treatment and eventually returned to Senegal on November 9, 2003.

In the February 2007 presidential election, Sylla took 0.53% of the vote and eighth place. He was again the only Jëf-Jël candidate to be elected to the National Assembly in the parliamentary election held on June 3, 2007, winning the seat through national list proportional representation. On June 5, 2007, he announced that he was leaving politics for health reasons; he attributed his health problems to the 2003 attack, which was allegedly done by people close to President Abdoulaye Wade. He served as mayor of Thiès from 2014 to 2022.
