= 2001 Senegalese parliamentary election =

- 29 April 2001
- All 120 seats in the National Assembly; 60 seats needed for a majority
- Turnout: 67.39%
Party	Leader	Vote %	Seats	+/–
Sopi Coalition	Abdoulaye Wade	49.58	89	+63
Socialist	Ousmane Tanor Dieng	17.36	10	−83
AFP	Moustapha Niasse	16.13	11	New
AJ/PADS	Landing Savané	4.05	2	−2
URD	Djibo Leyti Kâ	3.68	3	−8
Liberal	Ousmane Ngom	0.92	1	New
PPC	Mbaye-Jacques Diop	0.91	1	New
APJ/Jëf-Jël		0.80	1	New
RND		0.71	1	0
PIT		0.58	1	0
This lists parties that won seats. See the complete results below.

Parliamentary elections were held in Senegal on 29 April 2001 to elect members of the National Assembly. They were the first held under the new constitution approved by a referendum earlier in the year. Following the victory of Abdoulaye Wade in the February–March 2000 presidential election, the Sopi Coalition, including Wade's Senegalese Democratic Party and its allies, won a large majority.

After Wade was elected president, he entered a situation of cohabitation with the Socialist Party, which still held an overwhelming majority of seats in the National Assembly. Wade was constitutionally barred from dissolving the National Assembly and calling a new parliamentary election, but he decided to revise the constitution and said that he would not pursue policy initiatives in the meantime. Since he was not seeking new legislation, he did not need to compromise with the National Assembly, which simply approved the budget and adjourned. The Socialist Party did not object to Wade's constitutional changes, which included giving the President the right to dissolve the National Assembly, and the new constitution easily passed a referendum in January 2001. Wade then dissolved the National Assembly and called a new parliamentary election. The Socialist-controlled upper house of Parliament, the Senate, was abolished by the referendum.

Although Wade was barred by the January 2001 Constitution from addressing rallies during the election campaign and the Sopi Coalition was not allowed to use his picture on its ballot papers, Wade actively and prominently participated in the Sopi campaign, drawing criticism from opponents. Wade urged the people to vote for the Sopi Coalition so that he could govern effectively with a secure majority.

== Results ==
Party	Votes	%	Seats			
Party	Votes	%	National	Departmental	Total	+/–
Sopi Coalition	931,617	49.58	27	62	89	+63
Socialist Party	326,126	17.36	10	0	10	–83
Alliance of the Forces of Progress	303,150	16.13	9	2	11	New
And-Jëf/African Party for Democracy and Socialism	76,102	4.05	2	0	2	–2
Union for Democratic Renewal	69,109	3.68	2	1	3	–8
Senegalese Liberal Party	17,240	0.92	1	0	1	New
Party for Progress and Citizenship	17,122	0.91	1	0	1	New
Alliance for Progress and Justice/Jëf-Jël	15,048	0.80	1	0	1	New
National Democratic Rally	13,286	0.71	1	0	1	0
Party of Independence and Labour	10,854	0.58	1	0	1	0
Rally of the Ecologists of Senegal – The Greens	10,546	0.56	0	0	0	New
Democratic Union of Patriotic Progressive Forces	10,395	0.55	0	0	0	New
Reform Movement for Social Development	10,341	0.55	0	0	0	New
Citizens' Movement for a Development Democracy	8,925	0.48	0	0	0	New
Party of Renaissance and Citizenship	8,719	0.46	0	0	0	New
Front for Socialism and Democracy/Benno Jubël	7,923	0.42	0	0	0	–1
Senegalese People's Party	6,832	0.36	0	0	0	New
Gaïndé Centrist Bloc	6,251	0.33	0	0	0	–1
Social Democratic Party/Jant Bi	5,298	0.28	0	0	0	New
Movement for Democracy and Socialism/Niaxx Jariñu	5,142	0.27	0	0	0	New
Union for the Republic	4,841	0.26	0	0	0	New
Senegalese Republican Movement	4,149	0.22	0	0	0	0
African Independence Party – Renewal	3,682	0.20	0	0	0	New
Party for the African Renainssance	3,351	0.18	0	0	0	New
Rally of African Workers–Senegal	2,797	0.15	0	0	0	New
Total	1,878,846	100.00	55	65	120	–20
Valid votes	1,878,846	99.41				
Invalid/blank votes	11,082	0.59				
Total votes	1,889,928	100.00				
Registered voters/turnout	2,804,352	67.39				
Source: Direction Générale des Élections
