= 1998 Senegalese parliamentary election =

Parliamentary elections were held in Senegal on 24 May 1998. The result was a victory for the ruling Socialist Party, which won 93 of the 140 seats. Voter turnout was just 39%.

== Results ==
Party	Votes	%	Seats	+/–
Socialist Party	616,847	50.19	93	+9
Senegalese Democratic Party	235,470	19.16	23	–4
Union for Democratic Renewal	162,374	13.21	11	New
And-Jëf/African Party for Democracy and Socialism	60,760	4.94	4	(Note: Contested previous election as part of Let Us Unite Senegal alliance)
Democratic League/Movement for the Labour Party	48,445	3.94	3	0
Convention of Democrats and Patriots	24,579	2.00	1	
Front for Socialism and Democracy/Benno Jubël	16,445	1.34	1	New
Senegalese Democratic Union – Renewal	12,978	1.06	1	0
Party of Independence and Labour	10,899	0.89	1	–1
National Democratic Rally	8,220	0.67	1	
Gaïndé Centrist Bloc	7,517	0.61	1	New
Senegalese Patriotic Rally/Jammi Rewmi	4,706	0.38	0	New
Movement for Socialism and Unity	3,677	0.30	0	New
Senegalese Republican Movement	3,600	0.29	0	New
African Party for the Independence of the Masses	3,456	0.28	0	New
Rally for Progress, Justice and Socialism	3,336	0.27	0	New
Action for National Development	2,994	0.24	0	New
Union for Democracy and Federalism/Mbooloo Mi	2,820	0.23	0	New
Total	1,229,123	100.00	140	+20
Valid votes	1,229,123	98.88		
Invalid/blank votes	13,903	1.12		
Total votes	1,243,026	100.00		
Registered voters/turnout	3,164,827	39.28		
Source: African Elections Database
