= National Autonomous Electoral Commission =

The National Autonomous Electoral Commission or CENA (French: Commission électorale nationale autonome) is the commission that organises elections in Senegal. It was created in 2005, replacing an earlier commission called the National Observatory of Elections that was created in 1997.

== Creation ==
The National Observatory of Elections was created on 8 September 1997 by president Abdou Diouf, under Law 95-15, during the Third wave of democratization. In 2005, president Abdoulaye Wade, replaced the National Observatory of Elections by the National Autonomous Electoral Commission (CENA), defined as a legally and financially independent agency under Law 2005-07 of 11 May 2005.

== Membership ==
CENA is legally defined to have twelve members, who have to have a reputation for independence and may not be members of political parties. The members are renewed by a third every three years, and each serve a period of six years.

Moustapha Touré was the president of CENA in 2008. In November 2009, he resigned under pressure from Senegalese president Abdoulaye Wade.

In late 2023, the terms of all twelve members of CENA had expired in January 2021. President Macky Sall named a new set of twelve members in November 2023, with Abdoulaye Sylla, a retired inspector-general as head, and Ndary Toure, a retired magistrate, as deputy head, under presidential decree. According to Radio France Internationale, the renewal was controversial because of a suspicion that it was a response to CENA being in favour of restoring opposition politician Ousmane Sonko to the electoral roll. Law professor Babacar Gueye described the choice of the new twelve members as being done "unilaterally" and that the inclusion of two people who had been members of Sall's political party would put in doubt the integrity of CENA's decisions. Fifteen citizens' associations called for the two former political party members to be replaced by people unaffiliated with political parties. A legal request under administrative law was filed on 13 November 2023 calling for the decree to be annulled.

== Recommendations ==
In 2008, following the 2007 Senegalese parliamentary election, CENA recommended that electors' photographs be included on electoral registers and that the numbers of electors per polling booth be reduced.
