= Senegalese Liberal Party =

Political party in Senegal

The Senegalese Liberal Party (Parti libéral sénégalais) was a political party in Senegal from 1998 to 2003, led by Ousmane Ngom.

The party was born through a split from the Senegalese Democratic Party (PDS). Ngom resigned from the PDS on June 11, 1998, after the party leadership was rearranged by PDS Secretary-General Abdoulaye Wade on June 5 and Ngom lost his position as deputy leader of the party and became permanent secretary instead. Ngom announced the creation of the PLS on June 18.

In the parliamentary election held on 29 April 2001, the PLS won 0.9% of the popular vote and 1 out of 120 seats; Ngom was the only PLS candidate to win a seat, which he gained through national list proportional representation.

In 2003 the party merged with PDS.
