= Parti social-démocrate =

Parti social-démocrate may refer to:

- Social Democratic Party (Benin)
- Social Democratic Party (France) (defunct)
- Social Democratic Party (Gabon)
- Social Democratic Party (Luxembourg) (defunct)
- Social Democratic Party (Rwanda)
- Social Democratic Party/Jant Bi, Senegal
- Mauritian Social Democrat Party

== See also ==
- Social Democratic Party
