= Union for Democratic Renewal (Senegal) =

Political party in Senegal

The Union for Democratic Renewal (Union pour le renouveau démocratique) is a political party in Senegal. It was founded by Djibo Leyti Kâ, a former minister under President Abdou Diouf who broke with the then-ruling Socialist Party, in 1998.

In the April 2001 parliamentary election, URD won 3.67% of the popular vote and three out of 120 seats in the National Assembly. It joined the government under President Abdoulaye Wade in April 2004. It participated in the parliamentary election of 3 June 2007 as part of the Sopi Coalition.
