= Union for Democratic Renewal =

Union for Democratic Renewal is the name of two national political parties:

- Union for Democratic Renewal (Republic of the Congo)
- Union for Democratic Renewal (Senegal)
