= Modou Dia =

Senegalese politician and former diplomat

Modou Dia (born 27 March 1950) is a Senegalese politician and former diplomat.

== Biography ==
Dia attended the Institut catholique d'arts et métiers in Lille.

Modou Dia worked most of his life in the Ministry of Foreign affairs. He also was the Senegalese permanent representative to the Organisation of the Islamic Conference.

1975–1978, he was head of the Economic and Technical Affairs Office, at the Ministry of Foreign Affairs and Senegalese Abroad

1978–1981, he was First Secretary at the Embassy of Senegal in Moscow.

1981–1983, he was Head of the Africa Division – at the Ministry of Foreign Affairs and Senegalese Abroad.

1983–1987, he was First Secretary at the Embassy of Senegal in Germany and Austria, residing in Bonn.

1987–1990, he was the Head of the Financial Division, at the Ministry of Foreign Affairs.

1990–1998, he was Counselor at the Consulate of Senegal in Jeddah, Saudi Arabia.

In February 2000, he was accredited Ambassador of Senegal to Saudi Arabia, with extended jurisdiction to Yemen, Bangladesh, Malaysia, Oman, and Pakistan. His diplomatique career ended in December 2006.

Dia was a candidate in the February 2007 presidential election, placing last out of 15 candidates with about 0.13% of the vote.
