= Idrissa Seck =

Senegalese politician

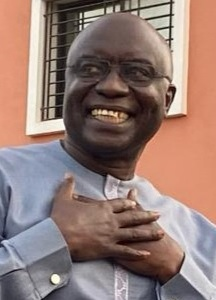
- Seck in 2024

Mayor of Thiès
- In office 2002–2014
- Preceded by: Talla Faye
- Succeeded by: Talla Sylla

Prime Minister of Senegal
- In office 4 November 2002 – 21 July 2004
- President: Abdoulaye Wade
- Preceded by: Mame Madior Boye
- Succeeded by: Macky Sall

Personal details
- Born: 9 August 1959 (age 67) Thiès, Senegal
- Party: Rewmi
- Other political affiliations: PDS (until 2006)
- Spouse: Ndèye Penda Tall

Idrissa Seck (born 9 August 1959) is a Senegalese politician who was Prime Minister of Senegal from November 2002 to July 2004. He was a leading member of the Senegalese Democratic Party (PDS) and was considered a protégé of President Abdoulaye Wade, but he subsequently went into opposition and was a candidate in the February 2007 presidential election, coming second place with about 15% of the vote.

== Biography ==
He was born in Thiès and studied in Paris as well as at Princeton University. He joined the PDS when he was 15 years old and was Wade's campaign director in the 1988 Senegalese presidential election.

Seck served as Minister of Trade, Crafts, and Industrialization as an opposition member of Abdou Diouf's government. He became deputy leader of the PDS in 1998, replacing Ousmane Ngom. After Wade took office in April 2000, he appointed Seck as Minister of State and Director of the Cabinet. The PDS was restructured after this election; Seck's position of Executive Secretary was eliminated and he instead became Deputy National Secretary. He also became Mayor of Thiès.

Seck was appointed as prime minister by Wade on November 4, 2002, replacing Mame Madior Boye; this was the first time that Wade had appointed a prime minister from the PDS since he took office as president. Seck served as prime minister until July 21, 2004, when he was dismissed by Wade.

Seck was detained in July 2005 for alleged corruption in connection with a road project in Thiès, and he was additionally charged with threatening state security. In a decision made on August 4 and announced on August 6, he was expelled from the PDS by its steering committee, along with three of his supporters: Papa Diouf, Awa Gueye Kebe, and Oumar Sarr. He never faced trial; on January 27, 2006, the charge of threatening state security was dismissed, and in early February the corruption charges were also partially dismissed and he was released from prison. On April 4, 2006, he announced his intention to run for president in 2007.

On September 24, 2006, Seck announced the formation of a new party, Rewmi (Wolof for "the country"). On January 22, 2007, Wade said that Seck had agreed to return to the PDS. Seck confirmed this on February 1, but said that he would still run for president.

According to final results released after the presidential election, which was held on February 25, 2007, Seck took second place with 14.92% of the vote, falling far behind Wade, who won a majority in the first round. He won one of the country's 34 departments, that of Thiès. Following the election, Wade announced that several opposition leaders would face prosecution for corruption, including Seck. Wade said that Seck had stolen 40 billion CFA francs and deposited the money abroad; he also said that Seck would not be his successor. Subsequently, after the final results were released on March 11, Seck congratulated Wade on his victory; he was the only major opposition leader to do so.

Seck's Rewmi party participated in a boycott of the June 2007 parliamentary election, announced in early April. Seck said that Wade had broken off dialogue with the opposition and that it would reconsider the boycott if he engaged in dialogue.

After the election, a rapprochement between Wade and Seck and their respective parties began, and Seck sought to return to the PDS. On August 13, 2007, Wade said that the PDS steering committee would have to decide whether or not to readmit Seck and his supporters into the party. Seck and Wade met for several hours on January 12, 2009, and afterwards Seck announced that the two had resolved their "misunderstandings" and had reconciled.

Following the March 2009 local election in Thiès, Seck was again elected as Mayor of Thiès on April 21, 2009. He received 64 out of 69 votes from the municipal councillors.

== Education ==
Idrissa Seck was born in Thiès on August 9, 1959 to Assane Seck and Fatou Seck, born Diop.

After studying at the Koranic school, Idrissa Seck joined the Randoulène Sud 2 school in Thiès where he completed his primary cycle and then the Collège Saint-Gabriel de Thiès for his secondary cycle, which was completed by the baccalaureate in 1981.

A scholarship holder, he joined the preparatory class at the École des hautes études commerciales de Paris (HEC) of the Marcelin-Berthelot high school in Saint-Maur-des-Fossés in France and then in 1983, Sciences Po, in the "Economy and Finance" section.

In 1989, he benefited from Princeton University's Parvin Fellowship program. In Princeton, he was a student at the Woodrow Wilson School of Public and International Affairs.

== Professional career ==
Idrissa Seck is the founder of the consulting firm GDP INITIATIVES (Global Development for Peace) and ÉPI SA (Epistemon International), an education and health institution.

== Presidential election campaigns ==
=== 2024 ===
In April 2023, Idrissa Seck announced his candidacy for the presidential election of 2024 (en). He asserted that the incumbent president, Macky Sall, should uphold the will of people and the constitution by not running a third term. In support of rule of law and a strong democracy, Seck has also stated he supports opposition politician Ousmane Sonko's right to stand as a candidate.

=== 2019 ===
Idrissa Seck ran for a third time in the 2019 presidential election. He led the "Idy 2019" coalition[25]. His rivals included incumbent president Macky Sall, Ousmane Sonko, Madické Niang and Issa Sall. With the exile of Karim Wade and the imprisonment of Khalifa Sall, Seck emerged as the main opposition candidate against the incumbent Macky Sall who won the election in the first round with 58.26% of the vote. Idrissa Seck came in second with 899,556 votes, or 20.51%. Also winning the departments of Thiès and Mbacké.

=== 2012 ===
The 2012 presidential election took place in a highly tense political context. Idrissa Seck, denounced then President Wade's third term candidacy and ran under the banner of his political party Rewmi. At the end of the first round, Idrissa Seck obtained only 7% of the vote. The second round pitted incumbent President Abdoulaye Wade against Macky Sall. Intent on defending Senegal against then President Wade from running a third term, Idrissa Seck, presented a united front with all M23 candidates, to support Macky Sall's candidacy. Sall was elected with 65.8% of the vote, marking the second democratic changeover in the fledgling democratic nation of Senegal.

=== 2007 ===
On April 4, 2006, Seck announced his candidacy in the 2007 presidential election, against President Wade. He is the leader of the Rewmi party.

Seck finished second with 14.86% of the vote, in the first round, behind Abdoulaye Wade (55.90%).

== Political career ==
=== 2020: President of the Economic, Social and Environmental Council ===
On November 1, 2020, Idrissa Seck was appointed President of the Economic, Social and Environmental Council by President Macky Sall. His appointment marked a warming of relations with President Sall. He explained that he was "responding positively to the President's call" for a "union" to face up to the "challenges of the moment", and mentioned the economic and social crises arising from Covid 19, as well as insecurity in the West African sub-region. Two members of Idrissa Seck's Rewmi party, joined the government as Minister of the Digital Economy and Telecommunications and Minister of Livestock and Animal Production respectively. Idrissa Seck resigned as President of the Economic, Social and Environmental Council on April 24, 2023, after declaring himself a candidate in the 2024 presidential election.

=== 2020: COVID-19 response ===
On March 24, 2020, Macky Sall launched a wide-ranging consultation of all the country's political forces with a view to achieving national unity in the face of the COVID-19 pandemic. Idrissa Seck interested in maintaining the health and well-being of the people of Senegal fully endorsed Sall's initiative to create an emergency plan called Force Covid-19.

=== 2013-2019: Leader of Rewmi ===
Following the 2012 elections, Idrissa Seck's Rewmi party, supported Macky Sall in the second round of elections and joined the presidential ranks as part of the Benno Bokk Yakaar (BBY) coalition. In 2013, following numerous disagreements with Macky Sall, Rewmi splintered and left the presidential movement.

=== 2002: Prime Minister of the Republic of Senegal ===
His tenure as prime minister is best summed up by the strong economic growth experienced, with record GDP growth rates of 6.68% and 5.87% in 2003 and 2004.

=== 2000: Minister of State, Chief of Staff of the President of the Republic ===
In 2000, Idrissa Seck was, as in 1988, Director of Abdoulaye Wade’s presidential campaign. Wade won the election and Seck was appointed Minister of State, Chief of Staff of the President of the Republic. He held this position until November 3, 2002 when he was appointed prime minister.

=== 1995: Minister of Trade, Crafts and Industrialization ===
He entered the Thiam 3 Government of National Unity on behalf of the PDS as Minister of Trade, Crafts and Industrialization.

=== 1988: Abdoulaye Wade presidential campaign ===
In 1988, then 29 years old, Idrissa Seck was appointed Campaign Director to Abdoulaye Wade, the Presidential Candidate of the Senegalese Democratic Party[8].

== Political imprisonment ==
On July 23, 2005, Idrissa Seck, was placed in police custody and charged with « undermining state security » for unmentioned acts and incarcerated in the central prison of Dakar. Prime Minister Macky Sall made public the report of the State General Inspectorate which alleged Idrissa Seck, exceeded the budget of a construction site in Thiès and awarded a contract without having the right to do so.

On July 31, 2005, the parliamentary majority voted to indict Seck, as well as that of the Minister of Housing, Salif Bâ, before the High Court of Justice for « serious irregularities in the process of concluding public contracts ». The indictment obtained 69 votes out of 120 with 35 deputies voting against. The result of the vote was contested by some who maintained that the resolution did not obtain the number of votes necessary for its adoption (it would have taken at least 72 votes, i.e. the three-fifths required by Article 101 of the Constitution instead of the 69 obtained).

In 2006, the indictment against Idrissa Seck was reversed and after 199 days in prison, he was discreetly released on February 7.

Political offices
Preceded by Mame Madior Boye	Prime Minister of Senegal; 4 November 2002 – 21 April 2004	Succeeded by Macky Sall
