= Landing Savané =

Senegalese politician

Landing Savané (born January 10, 1945) is a Senegalese politician and the secretary-general of And-Jëf/African Party for Democracy and Socialism.

== Political career ==
Savané is from Casamance, in the south of Senegal; he was born in Bignona. He was a prominent figure in the radical student movement of the 1960s and a member of the underground communist African Independence Party (PAI). In 1965 Savané revolted against the PAI leadership and formed a separate Senegalese Communist Party. This split led to the dismantling of the Dakar cell of PAI. Savané's new party aligned with China. The Senegalese Communist Party did not last long, but Savané continued his political activity in other movements. Initially Savané and his followers regrouped as Democratic Youth. In 1970 Savané founded the Movement of Young Marxist-Leninists (MJML). After the dismantling of MJML, Savané formed the underground Marxist group Reenu-Rew (Roots of the Nation) in 1973. Reenu-Rew gave birth to And-Jëf (Act together) in 1974. Savané was jailed in 1975, but released in 1976. In 1981 And-Jëf was able to register itself as a legal political party. As the leader of And-Jëf, Savané was one of the most prominent opposition leaders in the country.

He unsuccessfully ran for president in 1988 and 1993, taking 0.25% of the vote (fourth place) in 1988 and 2.91% (third place) in 1993. Savané was a Deputy in the National Assembly from 1993 to 2000. During the presidency of Abdou Diouf, from 1981 to 2000, Savané never took part in the government, and And-Jëf was the only major opposition group to consistently refuse to participate in the government. Following riots on February 16, 1994, Savané and fellow opposition leader Abdoulaye Wade were arrested on February 18. Savané was eventually released in July 1994. In 1998, he compared Diouf to a mafia leader: "after 20 years in power, a ruling clique comes to resemble a mafia, and heads of the mafia generally don't resign." Savané was re-elected to the National Assembly in the May 1998 parliamentary election, and subsequently he was a vice-president of the National Assembly from July 1998 to March 2000.

Savané supported Wade, the main opposition candidate, in the February–March 2000 presidential election, and after Wade's victory Savané was appointed to the government as Minister of Mines, Crafts and Industry in April 2000. In May 2001 he was removed from responsibility for mines, but remained Minister of Crafts and Industry; in November 2002 he was promoted to the rank of Minister of State, while remaining in charge of crafts and industry. He remained in that position until May 2005, when he instead became Minister of State under the President.

On November 12, 2006, Savané was invested as his party's candidate for the presidential election of February 25, 2007. Despite running against Wade, the incumbent president, Savané retained his position as Minister of State under the President in a cabinet reshuffle on November 23. In early February 2007 Savané announced that he and his party would end their alliance with Wade regardless of who won the election. In the election, Savané took seventh place with 2.07% of the vote. He and the other AJ/PADS ministers resigned from the government on February 27, immediately after the election, but the party remained part of the presidential majority supporting Wade.

Savané was one of three candidates of the coalition And Defaar Sénégal to be elected to the National Assembly in the June 2007 parliamentary election, winning a seat through national list proportional representation. The coalition, which included AJ/PADS, had backed Savané in the presidential election and chose not to participate in an opposition boycott of the parliamentary election. Savané was again appointed to the post of Minister of State under the President on March 31, 2008, while another AJ/PADS member, Mamadou Diop Decroix, was appointed as Minister of Trade. Later, Savané came into conflict with Decroix, who was Deputy Secretary-General of AJ/PADS, and expelled him from the party, although that decision was contested and caused an internal party crisis in early 2009. Savané was removed from his post as Minister of State under the President on May 1, 2009, and two months later he announced that AJ/PADS was rejoining the opposition.

On 29 December 2009, Savané expressed his solidarity with Senegalese Christians who were offended by comments in which Wade defensively compared an "African Renaissance" statue that was under construction to Christian religious imagery. He reiterated his view that "Wade is now a danger to the nation" and stressed the importance of preserving peace and harmony. According to Savané, Wade treated the people like ignorant children unable to make proper decisions and showed his contempt for them through his efforts "to impose a third term, by fraud if necessary, and his son as his successor". He also argued that Wade showed contempt for political parties by excluding them from decisions regarding the electoral code and he alleged that Wade was trying to set Senegalese of different religions against one another, thereby disregarding Senegal's history of religious tolerance and harmony.

== Family and personal life ==
He is married to Marie-Angélique Savané, a sociologist and feminist activist.

They are the parents of retired professional basketball player Sitapha Savané, who also played for the Senegal national basketball team.
