= Rally for the People =

Political party in Senegal

The Rally for the People (Rassemblement pour le peuple) is a political party in Senegal. At the legislative elections of 3 June 2007, the party won 4.25% of the popular vote and 2 out of 150 seats.
