= 1993 Senegalese parliamentary election =

Parliamentary election in Senegal

Parliamentary elections were held in Senegal on 9 May 1993. The result was a victory for the ruling Socialist Party, which won 84 of the 120 seats. Voter turnout was around 41%.

== Results ==
| Party | Votes | % | Seats | | | |
| Party | Votes | % | National | Departmental | Total | +/– |
|---|---|---|---|---|---|---|
| Socialist Party | 602,171 | 56.56 | 40 | 44 | 84 | –19 |
| Senegalese Democratic Party | 321,585 | 30.21 | 21 | 6 | 27 | +10 |
| Jappoo Liggeeyal Sénégal (RND–CDP–PADS) | 52,189 | 4.90 | 3 | 0 | 3 | New |
| Democratic League/Movement for the Labour Party | 43,950 | 4.13 | 3 | 0 | 3 | +3 |
| Party of Independence and Labour | 32,348 | 3.04 | 2 | 0 | 2 | +2 |
| Senegalese Democratic Union – Renewal | 12,339 | 1.16 | 1 | 0 | 1 | +1 |
| Total | 1,064,582 | 100.00 | 70 | 50 | 120 | 0 |
| Valid votes | 1,064,582 | 99.44 | | | | |
| Invalid/blank votes | 5,957 | 0.56 | | | | |
| Total votes | 1,070,539 | 100.00 | | | | |
| Registered voters/turnout | 2,613,095 | 40.97 | | | | |
Source: Direction Générale des Élections
