= National Patriotic Union/Tekki =

Political party in Senegal

The National Patriotic Union/Tekki (French: Union nationale patriotique) is a political party in Senegal led by founder Mamadou Lamine Diallo. At the legislative elections of 3 June 2007, the party won 1.29% of the popular vote and 1 out of 150 seats. Tekki won one seat in Dakar, for leader Mamadou Diallo, during the 2017 parliamentary election, as part of the opposition coalition Manko Wattu Sénégal, affiliated with former President Abdoulaye Wade.
