= Louis Jacques Senghor =

Senegalese politician

Louis Jacques Senghor (born February 24, 1952) is a Senegalese politician, and was a candidate in the February 2007 presidential election. He was the candidate of the Senegalese People's Liberal Movement (MLPS). Senghor is the grandson of the first Senegalese president, Léopold Sédar Senghor.

Senghor was born in Djilor. In the 2007 election, Senghor came in 14th place with about 0.24% of the vote.

Two months after the election, he was reported to have fled to the United States after being involved in a bad-cheque case involving 40 million West African CFA francs (some $80,000).
