= Waar Wi =

Political alliance in Senegal

Waar Wi is a political alliance in Senegal. At the legislative elections of 3 June 2007, the alliance won 4.35% of the popular vote and 3 out of 150 seats.
