= Liberal Pupils and Students Movement =

The Liberal Pupils and Students Movement (French: Mouvement des élèves et étudiants libéraux, MEEL) is the student wing of the Senegalese Democratic Party (PDS).
