= Convergence for Renewal and Citizenship =

Political party in Senegal

The Convergence for Renewal and Citizenship (Convergence pour le renouveau et la citoyenneté) is a political party in Senegal. At the legislative elections of 3 June 2007, the party won 1.78% of the popular vote and 1 out of 150 seats.
