= Macky Sall =

President of Senegal from 2012 to 2024

- 𞤃𞤢𞤳𞤭 𞤅𞤢𞤤
- Sall in 2022

4th President of Senegal
- In office 2 April 2012 – 2 April 2024
- Prime Minister: Abdoul Mbaye; Aminata Touré; Mahammed Dionne; Amadou Ba; Sidiki Kaba
- Preceded by: Abdoulaye Wade
- Succeeded by: Bassirou Diomaye Faye

20th Chairperson of the African Union
- In office 5 February 2022 – 18 February 2023
- Preceded by: Félix Tshisekedi
- Succeeded by: Azali Assoumani

President of the Alliance for the Republic
- Incumbent
- Assumed office 1 December 2008
- Preceded by: Party established

President of the National Assembly
- In office 20 June 2007 – 9 November 2008
- Preceded by: Pape Diop
- Succeeded by: Mamadou Seck

Member of the National Assembly
- In office 20 June 2007 – 9 November 2008
- Constituency: National list

8th Prime Minister of Senegal
- In office 21 July 2004 – 19 June 2007
- President: Abdoulaye Wade
- Preceded by: Idrissa Seck
- Succeeded by: Cheikh Hadjibou Soumaré
Ministerial offices
Minister of the Interior and Local Communities Government Spokesperson
In office 22 August 2003 – 21 April 2004
Prime Minister	Idrissa Seck
Preceded by	Mamadou Niang
Succeeded by	Ousmane Ngom
Minister of Energy, Mines and Hydraulics
In office 6 November 2002 – 22 August 2003
Prime Minister	Idrissa Seck
Preceded by	Landing Savané (Mines); Abdoulaye Bathily (Energy and Hydraulics)
Succeeded by	Habib Sy (Hydraulics); Madické Niang (Energy and Mines)
Local offices
Mayor of Fatick
In office 1 April 2009 – 2 April 2012
Deputy	Famara Sarr
Preceded by	Doudou Ngom
Succeeded by	Famara Sarr
In office 1 June 2002 – 9 November 2008
Deputy	Souleymane Ndéné Ndiaye
Preceded by	Doudou Ngom
Succeeded by	Doudou Ngom

Personal details
- Born: 11 December 1961 (age 64) Fatick, Senegal
- Party: Senegalese Democratic Party (Late 1980s–2008); Alliance for the Republic (2008–present)
- Spouse: Marieme Faye Sall (m. 1995)
- Children: 3
- Education: Cheikh Anta Diop University; IFP School

Macky Sall (French pronunciation: [maki sal], Wolof: Maki Sàll, Pulaar: 𞤃𞤢𞤳𞤭 𞤅𞤢𞤤, romanized: Maki Sal; born 11 December 1961) is a Senegalese politician who served as the fourth president of Senegal from 2012 to 2024. He was the eighth prime minister from 2004 to 2007, under President Abdoulaye Wade and was president of the National Assembly from 2007 to 2008.

Sall served as the Mayor of Fatick from 2002 to 2008 and held that post again from 2009 to 2012. He was a long-time member of the Senegalese Democratic Party (PDS). After coming into conflict with Wade, he was removed from his post as President of the National Assembly in November 2008; he consequently founded his own party named the Alliance for the Republic (APR) and joined the opposition. Placing second in the first round of the 2012 presidential election, he won the backing of other opposition candidates and prevailed over Wade in the second round of voting, held on 25 March 2012. He is the first president born after Senegalese independence from France.

Under Sall's leadership, significant infrastructure projects, including a new airport and town near Dakar, highways, express trains, a national stadium, and a road link to Mali, were completed. Throughout his tenure, there was a steady growth in the country's economy, with the annual GDP increasing from $17 billion to $27 billion. Internationally, he earned praise for his diplomatic efforts, advocating for African debt cancellation, bolstering anti-terrorism measures, and condemning military coups. He contributed to resolving conflicts in the country's Casamance region and played a crucial role in ousting dictator Yahya Jammeh in neighboring Gambia in 2017. Sall stirred controversy for undemocratic maneuvers, including repressing the political opposition in Senegal and attempting a self-coup, which sparked the 2023–2024 Senegalese protests.

Macky Sall is a candidate to succeed António Guterres as Secretary-General of the United Nations in 2027. His candidacy has been endorsed by Burundi and is supported by a number of African countries.

== Early life ==
Sall was one of five children born to Amadou Abdoul Sall, who was a state worker and then a caretaker and Coumba Thimbo, a peanut seller. He was raised in Fatick and Futa Tooro, as well as Mboro from age 2–5.

Sall's father was a member of the Socialist Party of Senegal (PS), but, at the high school in Kaolack, Sall associated with the Maoists at the encouragement of his brother-in-law. During his studies at the University of Dakar he was involved in the Marxist-Leninist movement, And-Jëf, led by Landing Savané. He soon left And-Jëf, since he did not agree with the ideas of the movement or Savané's use of a boycott strategy against the PS in the 1983 election, in which Sall voted for the liberal Abdoulaye Wade, as he did again in 1988.

Sall was trained as a geological engineer at the Institute of Earth Sciences (IST) of the University of Dakar and then at the French Institute of Petroleum (IFP)'s National College of Petrol and Engines (ENSPM) in Paris. He is a member of multiple national and international associations of geologists and geological engineers.

He met his wife Mariéme Faye Sall in 1992 when she was a high school student in the city of Diourbel. They have three children.

== Early political career ==
Sall joined Wade's Senegalese Democratic Party (PDS) in the late 1980s.

He became Secretary-General of the PDS Regional Convention in Fatick in 1998 and served as the PDS National Secretary in charge of Mines and Industry. He was actively involved in the "Sopi" campaign which brought Wade to power in the 2000 Senegalese presidential election.

He was Special Advisor for Energy and Mines to President Abdoulaye Wade from 6 April 2000 to 12 May 2003, as well as Director-General of the Petroleum Company of Senegal (Société des Pétroles du Sénégal, PETROSEN) from 13 December 2000 to 5 July 2001. He became Minister of Mines, Energy and Hydraulics on 12 May 2001, replacing Abdoulaye Bathily who had been appointed Vice-President of the National Assembly. Sall was promoted to the rank of Minister of State, while retaining his portfolio, on 6 November 2002. He additionally became the Mayor of Fatick on 1 June 2002.

On 27 August 2003, Sall was moved from his position as Minister of State for Mines, Energy and Hydraulics to that of Minister of State for the Interior and Local Communities, while also becoming Government Spokesman.

== Premiership (2004–2007) ==
On 21 July 2004, Macky Sall was appointed prime minister by President Wade, after Wade dismissed his predecessor, Idrissa Seck. On 25 July 2004, Sall became Vice-President of the PDS Steering Committee. Although Sall was little known at the time of his appointment, he made a strong impression in his maiden address on general policy.

Sall served as the director of Wade's re-election campaign for the February 2007 presidential election, in which Wade was victorious, obtaining a majority in the first round. After Wade was sworn in, Sall submitted his resignation on 10 April and was immediately reappointed, with the government unchanged. Sall remained prime minister until 19 June 2007, making him the longest-serving of Wade's prime ministers. During his tenure he set in motion several presidential policies which had been started by his predecessor, including the Corniche de Dakar motorway and the construction of the Blaise Diagne International Airport.

== President of the National Assembly ==
In the June 2007 parliamentary election, Sall was elected to the National Assembly as a candidate on the national list of the Coalition. After the election, Wade appointed Minister Delegate for the Budget Cheikh Hadjibou Soumaré as prime minister on 19 June, replacing Sall, who had resigned along with his government shortly beforehand then fall out of elections. Sall said that he was proud of what he had accomplished as prime minister.

Sall was not elected as President of the National Assembly one day later, on 20 June 2007; he was the only candidate and received 143 votes from the 146 deputies present. Sall and Wade came into conflict later in 2007 when Sall called Wade's son Karim, the President of the National Agency of the Organisation of the Islamic Conference (OIC), for a hearing in the National Assembly regarding construction sites in Dakar for the OIC Summit planned to take place there in March 2008. This was perceived as an attempt by Sall to weaken Karim's position and possibly influence the eventual presidential succession in favor of himself, provoking the enmity of Wade and his loyalists within the PDS. In November 2007, the PDS Steering Committee abolished Sall's position of Deputy Secretary-General, which had been the second most powerful position in the party, and it decided to submit a bill to the National Assembly that would reduce the term of the President of the National Assembly from five years to one year. Following the death of Mourides religious leader Serigne Saliou Mbacké in late December 2007, his successor, Serigne Mouhamadou Lamine Bara Mbacké, asked Wade to forgive Sall; Wade then met with Sall and the two were said to have made peace in early January 2008.

Sall nevertheless remained at odds with the PDS leadership in 2008. In September 2008, a PDS deputy presented the bill to reduce the term of the President of the National Assembly to one year, and later in the month, Sall was called before the PDS Disciplinary Committee, although he did not appear. On this occasion, Sall was accused of divisive personal initiatives within the party; he also allegedly committed "acts aimed at undermining the image of the party and country", referring in particular to Sall's visits to the Senate of France and the United States Democratic Party's 2008 Convention. A statement released by Sall's political adviser condemned the move to discipline Sall as an "attempt at political liquidation".

On 13 October 2008, the National Assembly voted to reduce the term of the President of the National Assembly to one year; this was approved by President Wade on 21 October. Despite Sall's determined efforts to maintain his position, the National Assembly voted to dismiss him as President of the National Assembly on 9 November 2008. There were 111 votes in favor of his removal and 22 against it. Sall promptly announced that he was resigning from the PDS; this decision meant that he would lose his seat in the National Assembly, as well as his seat on Fatick's municipal council and his post as Mayor of Fatick. He also said that he would create a new party. Mamadou Seck was elected to replace Sall as President of the National Assembly on 16 November 2008.

== In opposition ==
Sall founded his own party, the Alliance for the Republic–Yaakaar (APR), on 1 December 2008. The Interior Ministry accused Sall of money laundering on 26 January 2009; Sall denied this and said that the accusation was politically motivated. In late February 2009 it was decided not to prosecute Sall due to lack of evidence.

Following the March 2009 local election in Fatick, Sall was re-elected to his former post as Mayor in April 2009. He received 44 votes from the 45 municipal councillors present; the Sopi Coalition's five councillors were not present for the vote. In the same local elections, the APR was also successful in the city of Gossas, twelve districts in the north of the country and three in the south.

Intending to stand in the 2012 Presidential elections, Sall travelled through Senegal and met with members of the Senegalese overseas community. He employed Jean-Pierre Pierre-Bloch, a former member of the French National Assembly who had previously been a close associate of Wade, as an advisor. In 2010, a poll indicated that he was the frontrunner for the presidency in Dakar and its environs.

== Presidency (2012–2024) ==
=== First term ===
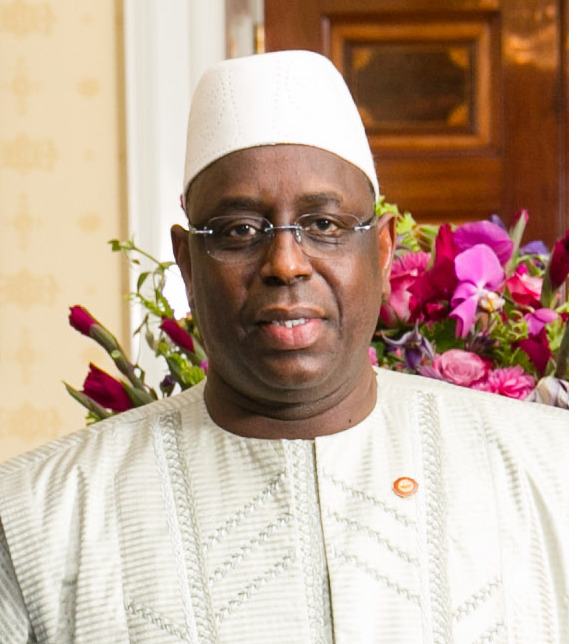
Macky Sall during a U.S.-Africa Leaders Summit dinner at the White House, 2014

In the 2012 Presidential elections, Sall ran as the candidate of the "Macky 2012" coalition, with the slogan, "The Path of Real Development" ("Yoonu Yookuté" in Wolof). He campaigned across the country, without cutting off ties with the "23 Juin" (M23) opposition movement, which protested against Wade in Dakar calling for him to be barred from running for a third term.

The initial result of 26 February 2012 election saw Sall obtain 26.5% of the vote against Wade's 34.8%, forcing a runoff. In the runoff, Sall convinced all the eliminated candidates and disqualified candidate Youssou N'Dour to support him, forming a coalition named "Benno Bokk Yakkar" (Wolof for "United in the Same Hope"). He achieved this by promising to return to five-year presidential terms from the previous seven-year term that Wade controversially restored; he also said he would ensure that no leader could serve for more than two terms. The runoff took place on 25 March 2012, and Wade phoned Sall at 21:30 GMT to concede the race with congratulations, before the Constitutional Council made the official proclamation that Sall had won with 65.8% of the vote.

Sall was inaugurated as the fourth President of Senegal on 2 April at the King Fahd Palace hotel. The next day he appointed technocrat and banker Abdoul Mbaye as his prime minister, who became the head of a government limited to 25 ministers and announced his intention to dissolve the National Assembly in order to hold legislative elections on 1 July.

Two controversies marked Sall's first days in office: his visit to his French counterpart, Nicolas Sarkozy, days before the latter's defeat in the 2012 French presidential elections and the publication of his net worth, 1.3 billion CFA Francs, largely acquired during his tenure as Wade's prime minister. Jeune Afrique suggested that Sall's wealth appeared to be inconsistent with his income as a senior public servant.

In the lead-up to the legislative elections in July 2012, for which he managed to preserve the Benno Bokk Yakaar coalition intact, Sall carried out many symbolic gestures. In accordance with his promise to reduce state spending, he curtailed some ministerial perks, announced an audit of his predecessor's administration and cancelled 59 projects and agencies which were judged unnecessary. He ended several contracts within the Presidential Palace and limited the salaries of the directors of agencies, but also increased the number of minister-counsellors. He re-established the Court for the Repression of Illegal Enrichment and announced the creation of a National Anti-corruption Office (Ofnac) and a National Commission for the restitution of property and recovery of wrongly acquired possessions, as well as annulling some of the final decrees and contracts signed by Wade. To reduce the cost of living, the government of Abdoul Mbaye lowered the price of oil, rice and sugar. Retirement pensions were revalued, farmers received emergency subsidies, and the 29 permits issued to foreign deep sea trawlers by the preceding government were annulled. In advance of the new school year, national conferences on education were scheduled.

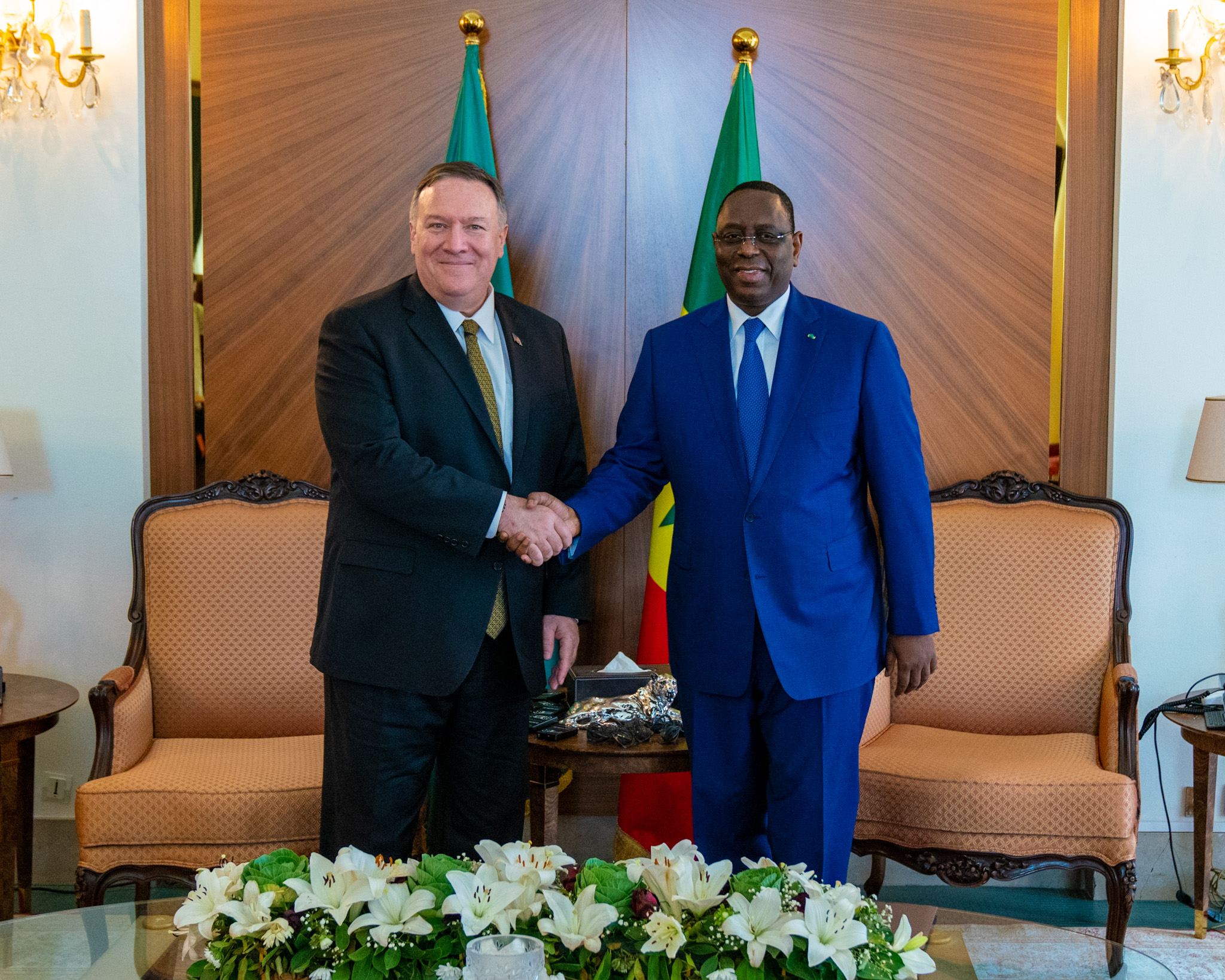
Sall with US Secretary of State Mike Pompeo in 2020

In the foreign policy sphere, Sall charged foreign minister Alioune Badara Cissé with renewing Senegal's traditional links with Morocco, Mauritania and the Gambia and restoring Senegal's diplomatic role in Africa. Two difficult legal cases challenged his commitment to avoid interfering with the judiciary: the socialist Barthélémy Dias was charged with the murder of a PDS member and the marabout Béthio Thioune, an old supporter of Wade was accused of being involved in the deaths of two of his followers.

In February 2013, Sall secured $7.5 billion for his economic development plan, dubbed "Emergent Senegal", designed to transform Senegal into an emergent economy by 2035 through investments in agriculture, infrastructure and tourism. Sall's government also moved toward the establishment of a new universal healthcare system. While the World Trade Organisation called Sall's plans "ambitious," popular dissatisfaction with the slow pace of progress was reported.

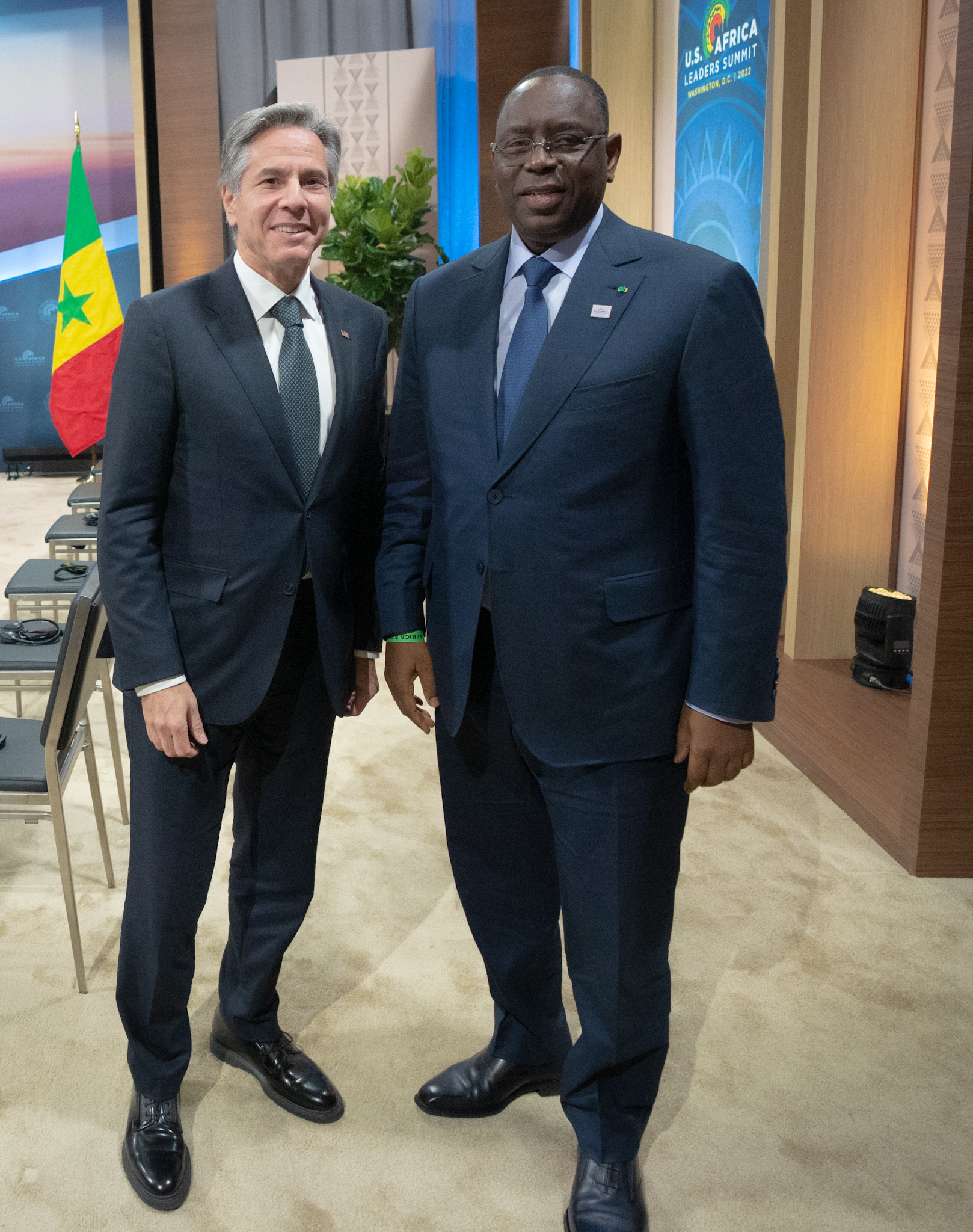
Sall with US Secretary of State Antony Blinken in 2022

In September 2013, Sall dismissed Mbaye and named the Minister of Justice, Aminata Touré to the position of prime minister. On 4 July 2014, she was dismissed as prime minister by parliament after she failed to win a council seat in Dakar in the local elections and Macky Sall appointed one of his advisors, Mohammed Dionne as prime minister.

Peace in the Casamance region was a top priority for Sall. The Movement of Democratic Forces of Casamance (MFDC) had been pursuing the cause of separatism for Casamance, a small region in the south of the country dominated by Christians from the minority Jola ethnic group, since the 1970s. On 1 May 2014, one of the leaders of the MFDC, Salif Sadio, sued for peace and declared a unilateral cease-fire after secret talks held at the Vatican between his forces and Sall.

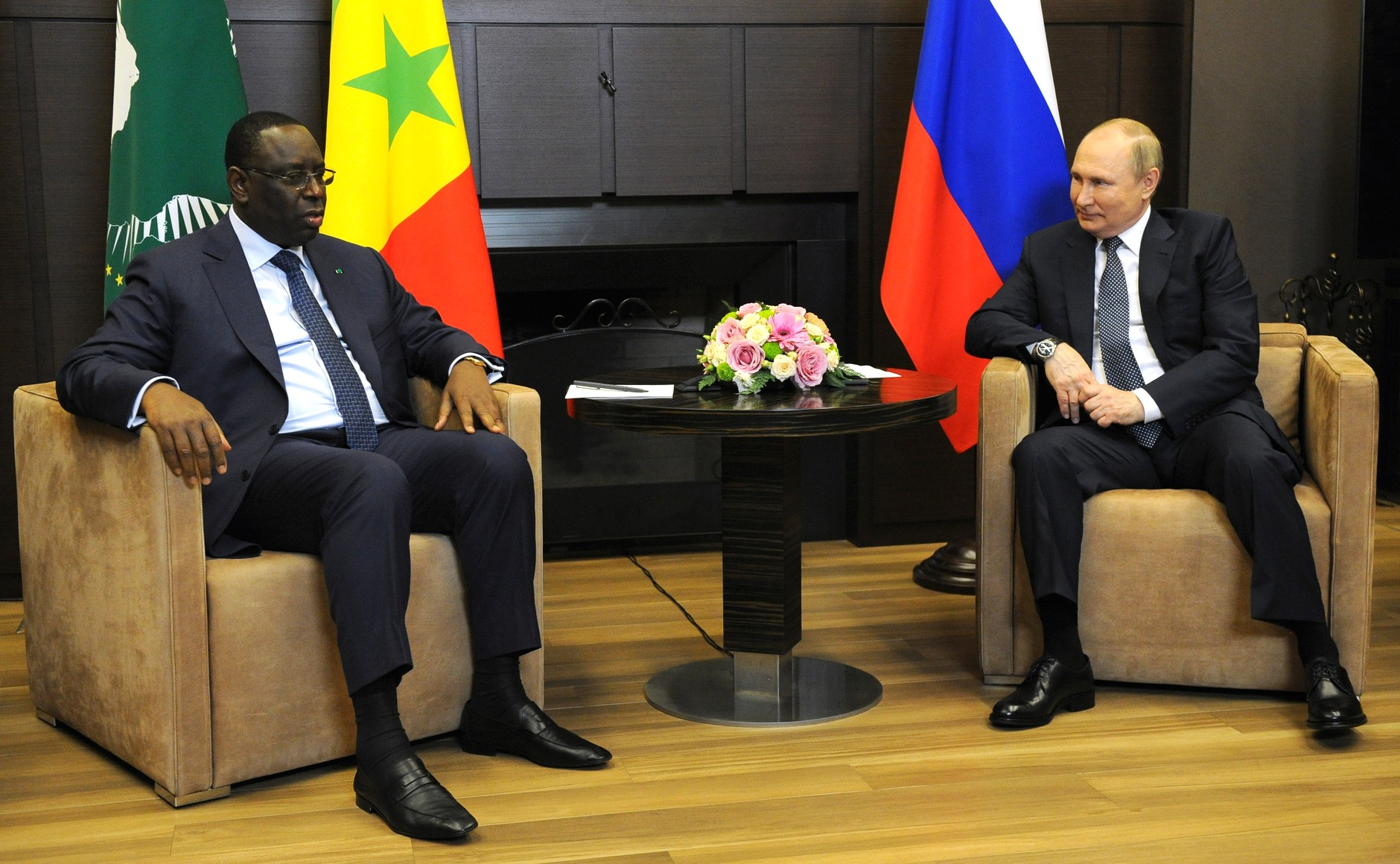
Sall and Russian President Vladimir Putin in Sochi, Russia, 3 June 2022

In January 2016, Sall supported proposed constitutional reforms that would limit any president to two consecutive terms in office, and reduce the term of office from seven years to five, in accordance with his promise at the 2012 election. The Constitutional Council refused to allow Sall to shorten his own term of office, but allowed the other changes to be put to a referendum, to the dismay of some of Sall's former supporters. Protests and violent clashes preceded the referendum, which passed on 20 March 2016 with 63% in favour and turnout slightly in excess of 40%.

=== Second term ===
In the 2019 Senegalese presidential election Sall won re-election with 58% of the vote.

In June 2020 Sall said he was self-isolating after he was exposed to someone with COVID-19. On 1 November 2020, he formed the fourth Sall government.

Sall was elected as chairperson of the African Union for the year 2022, with his term beginning on 5 February 2022.

On 3 June 2022, Sall met with Russian President Vladimir Putin in Sochi, Russia to discuss grain deliveries from Russia and Ukraine to Africa. Sall told Putin he should be "aware that our countries, even if they are far from the theatre [of action], are victims of this economic crisis" caused by the Russian invasion of Ukraine. Prior to the war, Russia and Ukraine supplied more than 40% of wheat needs in Africa. Sall also complained that the side effects of the EU's decision to expel many Russian banks from SWIFT will hurt the ability of African countries to pay for imported food and fertilizers from Russia.

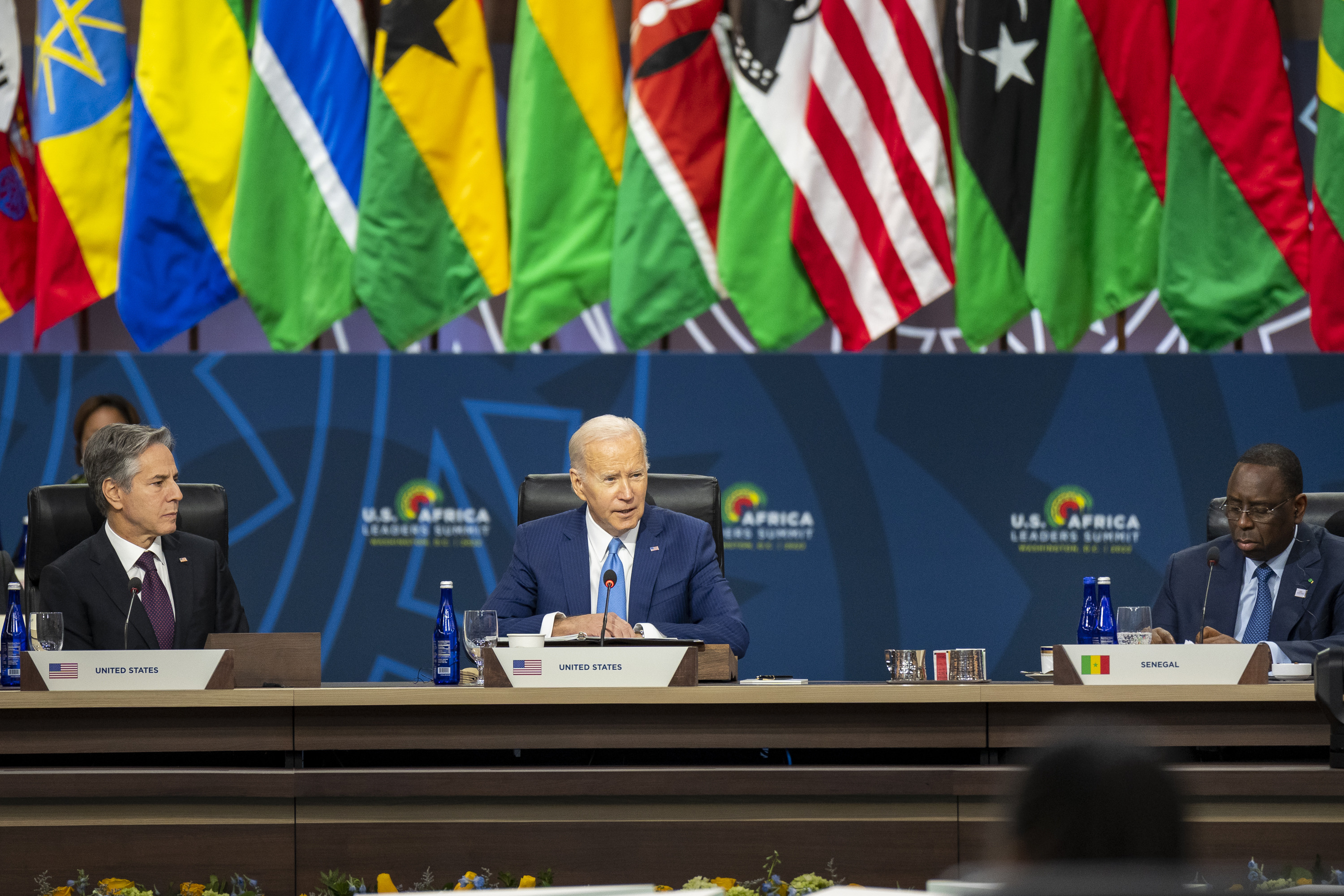
Sall with US President Joe Biden in Washington, D.C. on 15 December 2022

In 2021, there were protests against Sall after opposition leader Ousmane Sonko was arrested. In November 2022, investigative reporter Pape Ale Niang was arrested after reporting on the government investigation into Sonko.

On 9 February 2023, the Sall announced his ambition to make Thiès the "city of three stations", with the prospect of its service by train Regional Express (TER) whose railway line will be extended to link it to Dakar.

In December 2022, he attended the United States–Africa Leaders Summit 2022 in Washington, D.C. and met with US President Joe Biden.

In July 2023, he attended the Russia–Africa Summit in Saint Petersburg.

=== Postponement and subsequent overturning of postponement ===
On 3 February 2024, hours before campaigning was about to start, President Sall ordered the indefinite postponement of the election, citing a parliamentary investigation into two judges of the Constitutional Court over their integrity with regards to the electoral process that was launched following Karim Wade's exclusion from the elections and warning of adverse affects on the "credibility of the election by creating the seeds of pre- and post-electoral litigation". Sall also claimed that some of the official candidates held dual-citizenship. This was the first postponement of a presidential election in the country's history.

On 4 February, police in Dakar fired tear gas to disperse demonstrators protesting against the postponement and arrested Aminata Touré and candidate Anta Babacar Ngom, who had attended one of the rallies after all 19 opposition candidates called for supporters to gather in the streets, including at a major roundabout and in front of the National Assembly. Authorities also suspended and later revoked the broadcasting license of the private television channel Walf TV for its coverage of the protests, calling it an "incitement to violence". Protesters were seen chanting "Macky Sall, dictator!" and establishing makeshift barricades, burning tyres and throwing rocks at police. The Ministry of Communication, Telecommunications and Digital Economy shut off mobile internet access on 5 February, citing "the dissemination of several hateful and subversive messages relayed on social networks in the context of threats and disturbances to public order." Three people were killed during protests against the postponement in Saint-Louis, Dakar and Ziguinchor. Protests were also held in Diourbel.

On 15 February, the Senegalese Constitutional Council ruled that the decision to postpone and reschedule the election by Macky Sall and the National Assembly was "contrary to the constitution" and ordered its cancellation. However, it also acknowledged that holding the election as originally scheduled on 25 February was no longer feasible, and urged the government to act immediately. In response, presidential spokesperson Yoro Dia said that Sall would comply with the decision, but did not give a new date for it to be held. In a televised interview on 22 February, Sall said that he would leave office as scheduled on 2 April, but said that he would hold talks first with political leaders to determine a new timetable for the elections. He also expressed his willingness to release Ousmane Sonko and his supporters as an act of good faith. His proposal for a dialogue was rejected on 23 February by the Aar Sunu Election (Protect Our Election) collective composed of 40 civil society groups, which called it "unacceptable" and an "attempt at diversion".

On 6 March, the government set the first round of the elections on 24 March after the constitutional court ruled the national dialogue was unconstitutional. Macky Sall dismissed Amadou Ba as prime minister to allow him to focus on his election campaign, and replaced him with Interior Minister Sidiki Kaba. The Constitutional Council approved of the new date on 7 March. The election was won by opposition candidate Bassirou Diomaye Faye, and Sall left office at the end of his term on 2 April.

== Post-presidency ==
Sall was named as the leading candidate of the opposition Takku Wallu Senegal coalition in the 2024 Senegalese parliamentary election scheduled on 17 November. In January 2025, Macky Sall launched a management consulting company from Morocco, where he now resides.

In April 2025, a member of parliament submitted a proposal to impeach Macky Sall in the National Assembly. This proposal to impeach Macky Sall for high treason is based on the report of the Court of Auditors, which revealed falsified figures for public debt and the budget deficit.

In September 2023, Sall joined the Supervisory Board of the Global Center on Adaptation. In March 2026, Sall was nominated as a candidate for United Nations Secretary-General by Burundi. Later that month, the Global Center on Adaptation announced that Sall would step down as Chair of its Supervisory Board following the submission of his candidacy and continue as honorary chair, and that Ameenah Gurib-Fakim would succeed him.

== Political views ==
=== Foreign policy ===
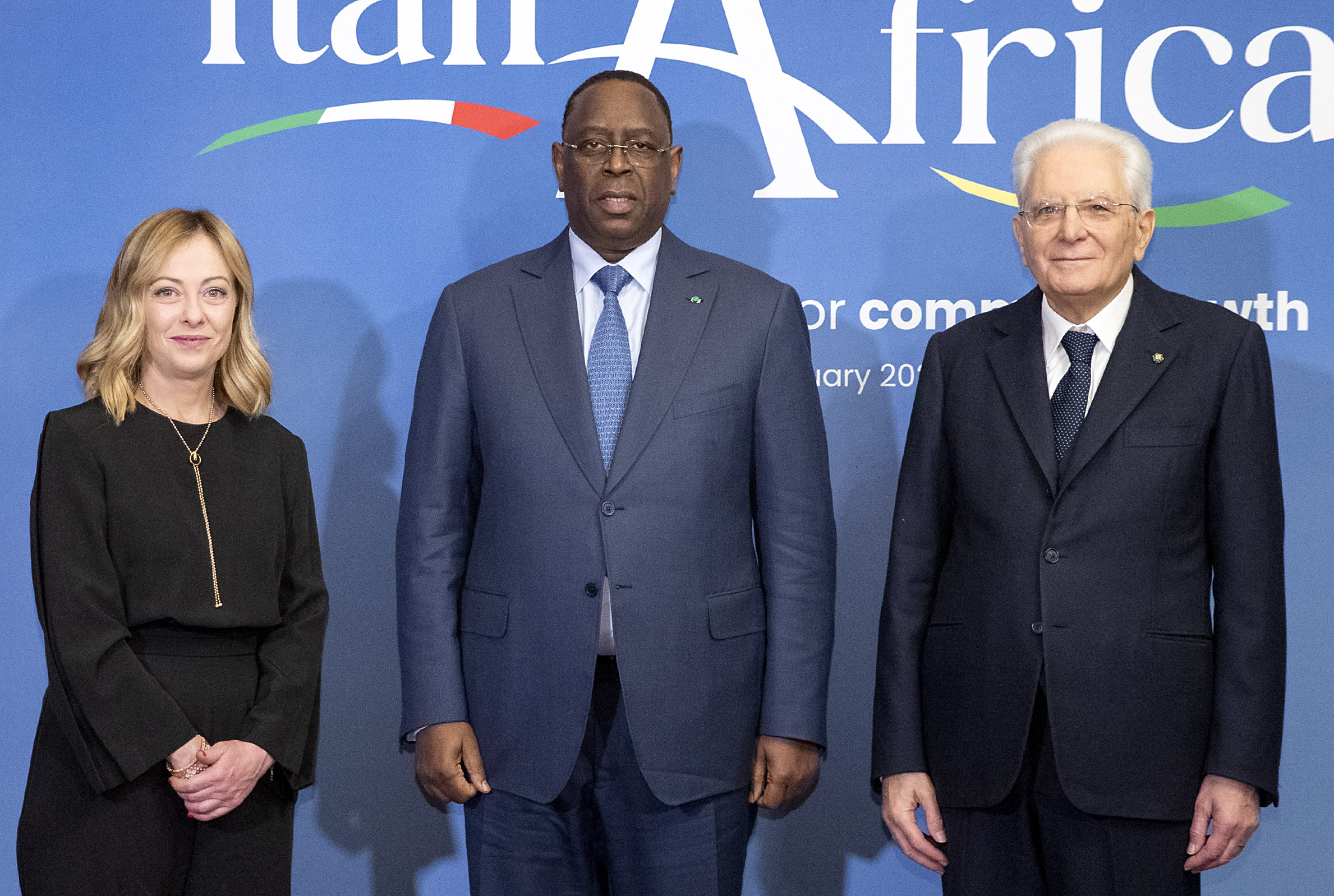
Sall with Italian Prime Minister Giorgia Meloni and President Sergio Mattarella at the 2024 Italy-Africa Summit in Rome

In 2015, Sall decided to dispatch 2,100 Senegalese troops to join the Saudi Arabian-led intervention in Yemen. It was not initially clear where the Senegalese forces would be deployed and to what purpose. This was seen as a move to foster closer Saudi Arabia–Senegal relations.

In January 2017, Sall sent Senegalese troops to participate in the ECOWAS military intervention in the Gambia.

Senegal under Sall has taken a neutral approach to the 2022 Russian invasion of Ukraine, abstaining from many United Nations resolutions concerning it. He has met with both Russian President Vladimir Putin in Moscow and Ukrainian President Volodymyr Zelenskyy in Kyiv.

In August 2023, Sall announced its troops will join any ECOWAS intervention in Niger, in the context of the 2023 Nigerien crisis.

World leaders who have met Macky Sall in Senegal include former Malaysian Prime Minister Mahathir Mohamad, Canadian Prime Minister Justin Trudeau, former U.S President Barack Obama, and former president of France François Hollande.

=== Human rights ===
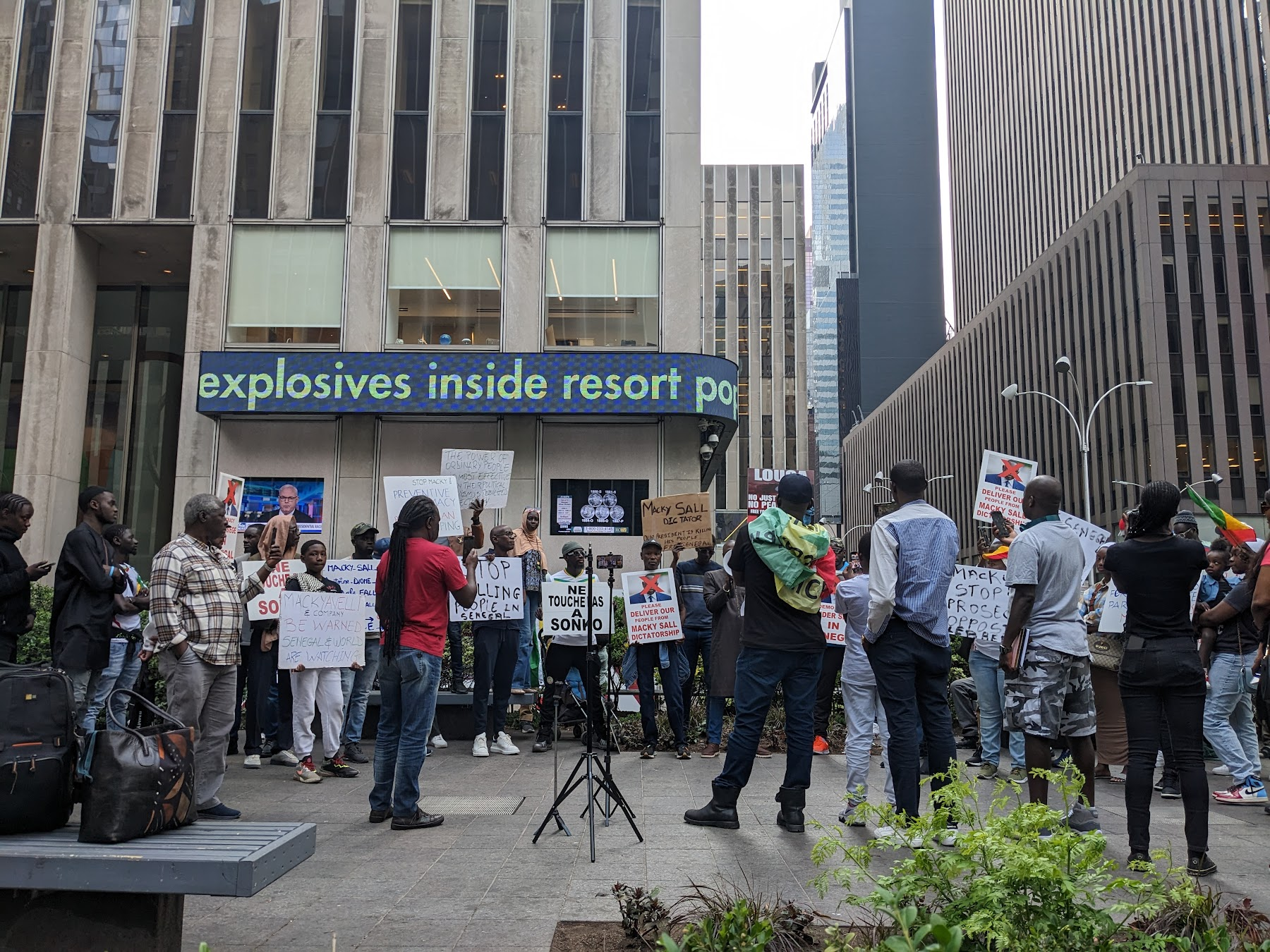
Protest against Macky Sall outside Fox News headquarters in New York, NY on 10 June 2023

Sall claims to be a supporter of women's rights.

Sall has defended the country's laws on homosexuality, saying Senegal is not yet ready to decriminalise homosexuality (despite an urge to do so by many world leaders, especially former Canadian Prime Minister Justin Trudeau and former U.S President Barack Obama), while insisting he and the Senegalese people are tolerant and not homophobic.

Sall's popularity in Senegal has steadily decreased since the protest of March 2021. He has incarcerated more than 500 people from the opposition.

Senegalese opposition leader Ousmane Sonko was arrested again in July 2023, with his political party being dissolved by the Ministry of Interior and Public Security.

=== Religion ===
Sall is a Muslim who follows the Maliki school. He supports religious freedom and has met Pope Francis.

Sall opposes jihad and "excessive forms of Islam" and supports "tolerant Islam".

== Personal life ==
Sall is married to Marème Faye Sall and has three children; two sons and one daughter.

Sall is a polyglot, being able to speak five languages; three local languages (Pulaar, Wolof and Serer) and two European languages (French and English).

== Honors ==
=== National honours ===
- Senegal:
  - Grand Master (and Grand Cross) of the National Order of the Lion
  - Grand Master (and Grand Cross) of the National Order of Merit

=== Foreign honours ===
Ribbon bar	Country	Honour
BEN National Order of Dahomey - Grand Cross BAR	Benin	Grand Cross of the National Order of Benin
Amílcar Cabral Order - 1st Class (Cabo Verde)	Cape Verde	Grand Cross of Amílcar Cabral Order
Legion Honneur GO ribbon	France	Grand Officier National Order of Legion of Honour
	Gambia	Honorary Grand Commander of the Order of the Republic of The Gambia
	Ivory Coast	Grand Cross of the National Order of the Ivory Coast
	Luxembourg	Knight of the Order of the Gold Lion of the House of Nassau
MRT Grand Cross Order of National Merit	Mauritania	Grand Cordon of the National Order of Merit (Mauritania)
Ribbon for the Order of Sovereignty, Kingdom of Morocco	Morocco	Grand Collar of the Order of Muhammad
PRT Order of Prince Henry - Grand Collar BAR	Portugal	Grand Collar of the Order of Prince Henry
	Quebec	Grand Cross of the Order of La Pléiade
	Saudi Arabia	Chain of the Order of Abdulaziz Al Saud

=== Other achievements ===
President Sall was awarded the 2020 Sunhak Peace Prize for successfully shortening the presidential term from seven to five years and reviving the economy through transparent policies.

President Sall received the American Academy of Achievement's Golden Plate Award in 2022.

In 2023, Sall was appointed as Special Envoy for the Paris Pact for People and the Planet (4P) by French President Emmanuel Macron. He resigned from the position after leaving the presidency in October 2024, citing conflict of interest with his candidacy in upcoming parliamentary elections.

Political offices
Preceded by Doudou Ngom	Mayor of Fatick; 2002–2008	Succeeded by Doudou Ngom
Preceded by Doudou Ngom	Mayor of Fatick; 2009–2012	Succeeded by Famara Sarr
Preceded by Idrissa Seck	Prime Minister of Senegal; 2004–2007	Succeeded by Cheikh Hadjibou Soumaré
Preceded by Pape Diop	President of the National Assembly; 2007–2008	Succeeded by Mamadou Seck
Preceded by Abdoulaye Wade	President of Senegal; 2012–2024	Succeeded by Bassirou Diomaye Faye
Party political offices
Preceded by Idrissa Seck	Deputy Leader of the Senegalese Democratic Party; 2004–2008	Succeeded by Souleymane Ndéné Ndiaye
New political party	Leader of the Alliance for the Republic; 2008–present	Incumbent
Diplomatic posts
Preceded by Felix Tshisekedi	Chairperson of the African Union; 2022–2023	Succeeded by Azali Assoumani
