= African Party for the Independence of the Masses =

Political party in Senegal

- Founded: July 1982
- Newspaper: Nation Africaine
- Ideology: Black nationalism

African Party for Independence of the Masses (in French: Parti Africain pour l'Indépendance des Masses) is a black nationalist political party in Senegal. It was legally registered in July 1982. PAIM publishes Nation Africaine.

PAIM favours a form of direct participative democracy.

In spite of its name, PAIM shares no organic link with PAI. Unlike PAI, PAIM is a non-Marxist party.

== Sources ==
- Zuccarelli, François. La vie politique sénégalaise (1940-1988). Paris: CHEAM, 1988.
