= And Defaar Sénégal =

Political alliance in Senegal

And Defaar Sénégal is a political alliance in Senegal. Its main member is the And-Jëf/African Party for Democracy and Socialism (AJ/PADS). In the 3 June 2007 parliamentary election, the alliance won 4.94% of the popular vote and 3 out of 150 seats.
