= Authentic Socialist Party (Senegal) =

Political party in Senegal

The Authentic Socialist Party (French: Parti socialiste authentique) is a political party in Senegal. The party was founded by Souty Touré, the current mayor of Tambacounda and a former government minister under Abdou Diouf. The party's base remains in the south eastern Tambacounda Region.

== History ==
In the 2007 elections the party received 1.5% of the national vote and won a single seat in the National Assembly. In the 2012 elections the party received just 0.5% of the vote and lost its single seat.
