= 2007 Senegalese parliamentary election =

- 3 June 2007
- All 150 seats in the National Assembly; 76 seats needed for a majority
- Turnout: 34.75%
Party	Leader	Vote %	Seats
Sopi 2007	Macky Sall	69.21	131
Takku Defaraat Sénégal	Robert Sagna	5.04	3
And Defaar Sénégal	Landing Savané	4.94	3
Waar Wi	Modou Fada Diagne	4.35	3
Rally for the People		4.25	2
FSD/Benno Jubël		2.18	1
APJ/Jëf-Jël	Talla Sylla	1.94	1
CRC	Aliou Dia	1.78	1
Authentic Socialist		1.53	1
UNP/Tekki		1.29	1
MRDS	Mbaye Niang	1.16	1
Rally of the Ecologists	Ousmane Sow Huchard	1.00	1
PSD/Jant Bi	Mamour Cissé	0.93	1
This lists parties that won seats. See the complete results below.

Parliamentary elections were held in Senegal on 3 June 2007 to elect the 150 members of the National Assembly. They had originally been planned to be held together with the presidential election on 25 February 2007, but were postponed. Fourteen parties or coalitions participated in the elections, but they were marked by a major opposition boycott. The ruling Sopi Coalition won 131 seats, including all 90 of the seats elected by majority voting.

== Electoral system ==
In late March, the National Assembly passed a law requiring gender parity in national candidate lists; this move was backed by Wade. However, in early April it was reported that, due to an appeal against the law filed by the Socialist Party, the application of the law was suspended and it was not in effect for the June election.

According to an electoral commission official in May, over 4,000 candidates were standing for the 150 National Assembly seats. Previously the Assembly was composed of 120 seats. 90 of the seats in the new Assembly were to be decided through majority votes and 60 were to be decided through proportional representation. Campaigning for the election began on 13 May and ran until midnight on 1 June. Members of the security forces voted a week early, on May 26 and May 27. Participation among the security forces was placed at 27.23%, and the boycotting parties (grouped into a coalition called the Siggil Sénégal Front) said that this indicated that the security forces observed the boycott.

== Campaign ==
On 2 April, twelve opposition parties, including the former ruling Socialist Party and the Rewmi party of Idrissa Seck, who placed second in the presidential election, announced they would boycott the election, alleging that the electoral roll was doctored. They wanted the electoral roll to be revised and for a new, independent electoral commission to be created. They had demanded that the Interior Minister, Ousmane Ngom, be dismissed; they also said that the constituencies were drawn to the advantage of the Democratic Party of President Abdoulaye Wade, and demanded that they be redrawn. Wade refused to talk to them and said that they could boycott if they wished. On 5 April, it was announced that the coalition And Defarat Sénégal, including And-Jëf/African Party for Democracy and Socialism (AJ-PADS), would contest the election, with a spokesman saying that boycotts were not politically effective. On 6 April, several of the main parties participating in the boycott announced that they were withdrawing their guarantees of 15 million CFA francs in order to invalidate their candidacies, citing the unwillingness of Wade to engage in dialogue. Prior to the deadline at midnight on the same day, 15 parties or coalitions filed candidate lists with the Interior Ministry, which had three days to determine the validity of the lists. Interior Minister Ngom pointed to the participation of 15 lists as evidence for the health of Senegalese democracy; others, however, have considered the situation to be a serious setback for democracy. 14 of the lists were approved and one, an independent list, was rejected.

In late April, the boycotting parties began a tour intended to explain the boycott throughout the country.

== Results ==
Initial reports described voter turnout as low, and it was estimated that turnout was no higher than 30–35%. Ngom and Prime Minister Macky Sall said that it was premature to say that turnout was low while voting was ongoing; Sall also argued that in any country, turnout in parliamentary elections is lower than in presidential elections. In the February 2007 presidential elections, turnout had been 70%; in the 2001 parliamentary elections it had been 67.4%. After voting, Wade expressed his hope for a large turnout but noted that voting was voluntary in Senegal. The Siggil Sénégal Front described turnout as very low and said that its boycott had been largely observed by the people. Ngom said that the next National Assembly would be legitimate regardless of the turnout rate. Former president Abdou Diouf voted in the election in Paris, despite the participation of the Socialist Party, which he led while he was president, in the boycott.

An interior ministry estimate on 4 June placed turnout at about 38%. Sall said that the Sopi Coalition won all 35 electoral districts and all of the 90 seats determined by majority voting. On the same day, the Siggil Sénégal Front demanded that Wade cancel the election and engage in dialogue with the opposition.

Provisional results were released on 7 June showed the Sopi Coalition with a total of 131 seats, taking all 90 of the seats elected by majority voting and a further 41 seats elected by proportional representation. Voter turnout was placed at 34.75%. Final results from the Constitutional Council on 14 June confirmed Sopi's victory with 131 seats.

Party	Votes	%	Seats		
Party	Votes	%	National	Departmental	Total
Sopi 2007	1,190,609	69.21	41	90	131
Takku Defaraat Sénégal	86,621	5.04	3	0	3
And Defaar Sénégal	84,998	4.94	3	0	3
Waar Wi	74,919	4.35	3	0	3
Rally for the People	73,083	4.25	2	0	2
Front for Socialism and Democracy/Benno Jubël	37,427	2.18	1	0	1
Alliance for Progress and Justice/Jëf-Jël	33,297	1.94	1	0	1
Convergence for Renewal and Citizenship	30,658	1.78	1	0	1
Authentic Socialist Party	26,320	1.53	1	0	1
National Patriotic Union/Tekki	22,271	1.29	1	0	1
Reform Movement for Social Development	20,041	1.16	1	0	1
Rally of the Ecologists of Senegal	17,267	1.00	1	0	1
Social Democratic Party/Jant Bi	15,968	0.93	1	0	1
Senegalese Patriotic Rally/Jammi Rewmi	6,847	0.40	0	0	0
Total	1,720,326	100.00	60	90	150
Valid votes	1,720,326	98.94			
Invalid/blank votes	18,349	1.06			
Total votes	1,738,675	100.00			
Registered voters/turnout	5,004,096	34.75			
Source: Direction Générale des Élections

== Aftermath ==
On 19 June Cheikh Hadjibou Soumaré, a technocrat who was not a member of the PDS, was appointed prime minister by Wade to replace Sall. A new government, largely similar to the old government and not including the opposition, was named on the same day.
