= Takku Defaraat Sénégal =

Political alliance in Senegal

Takku Defaraat Sénégal is a political alliance in Senegal, led by Robert Sagna. At the 3 June 2007 legislative elections, the alliance won 5.04% of the popular vote and 3 out of 150 seats.
