= Senegalese Democratic Union – Renewal =

Political party in Senegal

Senegalese Democratic Union-Renewal (in French: Union Démocratique Sénégalais-Rénovation), a political party in Senegal, founded in 1985 by Mamadou Fall, general secretary of the trade union UTLS, as a split from the Senegalese Democratic Party (PDS).

== Sources ==
1. Zuccarelli, François. La vie politique sénégalaise (1940-1988). Paris: CHEAM, 1988.
