= Senegalese Republican Movement =

Political party in Senegal

Senegalese Republican Movement (French: Mouvement Républicain Sénégalais) was a conservative political party in Senegal, founded on 3 July 1977.

MRS was legally recognized by Senegalese Law No. 78-60, on 28 December 1978. Senegal began a multi-party political process in 1976, with three legally-recognized parties. MRS became the fourth legal party in the country. The party was led by Boabacar Gueye, who served as its general secretary.

MRS worked for a free market economy and a society based on Islamic values. It represented the most conservative of the four parties in Senegal at the time.
