= Social Democratic Party/Jant Bi =

Political party in Senegal

The Social Democratic Party/Jant Bi (Parti social-démocrate) is a political party in Senegal. At the legislative elections of 3 June 2007, the party won 0.93% of the popular vote and 1 out of 150 seats.
