= Reform Movement for Social Development =

Political party in Senegal

The Reform Movement for Social Development (Mouvement de la réforme pour le développement social) is a political party in Senegal. At the legislative elections of 3 June 2007, the party won 1.16% of the popular vote and 1 out of 150 seats.
