= Alliance for Progress and Justice/Jëf-Jël =

Political party in Senegal

The Alliance for Progress and Justice/Jëf-Jël (Alliance pour le Progrès et la Justice/Jëf-Jël) is a political party in Senegal. At the legislative elections on 29 April 2001, the party won 0.8% of the popular vote and 1 out of 120 seats. At the legislative elections of 3 June 2007, the party won 1.94% of the popular vote and 1 out of 150 seats.
