= Front for Socialism and Democracy/Benno Jubël =

Political party in Senegal

- Secretary-General: Cheikh Bamba Dièye
- Founded: 3 June 2007
- Ideology: Social democracy

The Front for Socialism and Democracy/Benno Jubël (Front pour le socialisme et la démocratie) is a political party in Senegal. At the legislative elections of 3 June 2007, the party won 2.18% of the popular vote and 1 out of 150 seats.
