= Senegalese Democratic Party =

Political party in Senegal

Senegalese Democratic Party Parti démocratique sénégalais
- Secretary-General: Abdoulaye Wade
- Founded: 31 July 1974
- Headquarters: Dakar, Senegal
- Ideology: Liberalism; Economic liberalism
- Political position: Centre to centre-right
- National affiliation: Takku Wallu Sénégal
- Continental affiliation: Africa Liberal Network
- International affiliation: Liberal International
- Colours: Blue
- National Assembly: 0 / 150

The Senegalese Democratic Party (French: Parti démocratique sénégalais) is a political party in Senegal. The party considers itself a liberal party and is a member of the Liberal International. Abdoulaye Wade, who was President of Senegal from 2000 to 2012, is the party's leader. The PDS ruled together with smaller parties as part of the Sopi Coalition. Since Wade's defeat in the 2012 presidential election, the PDS has been the main opposition party.

== History ==
At a summit of the Organization of African Unity in Mogadishu in 1974, Wade told President Léopold Sédar Senghor that he wanted to start a new party, and Senghor agreed to this. The PDS was founded on 31 July 1974 and recognized on 8 August. In its first constitutive congress, held on 31 January – 1 February 1976, the PDS described itself as a party of labor, but soon afterwards a law was introduced according to which three parties were allowed in Senegal: a socialist party, a Marxist–Leninist party, and a liberal party. The first two categories were already taken, and the PDS assumed the role of a liberal party rather than be dissolved.

Abdoulaye Wade is the Secretary General of the PDS and has led the party since its foundation in 1974. The PDS joined the Liberal International at the latter's Berlin Congress in 1980.

The PDS participated, along with the ruling Socialist Party, in a national unity government that was formed in 1991, but withdrew from it on October 20, 1992, saying that the Socialist Party had monopolized control of the government and marginalized the PDS. Wade ran against the Socialist incumbent, Abdou Diouf, in the February 1993 presidential election, but lost to Diouf, receiving 32% of the vote against Diouf's 58%. In the subsequent May 1993 parliamentary election, the PDS won 27 out of 120 seats in the National Assembly. The PDS and the Socialist Party began discussing the formation of another government together, but this was aborted by the assassination of Constitutional Council vice-president Babacar Sèye on May 15; because the PDS had been critical of Sèye, they were suspected of responsibility for the killing. The PDS then joined the Bokk Sopi Senegaal opposition coalition, in which it remained until rejoining the government in March 1995.

Between 2005 and 2012 the PDS was associated with the international party network Alliance of Democrats. Within Senegal, the party has been part of the Patriotic Front for the Defence of the Republic since 2014 with And-Jëf/African Party for Democracy and Socialism.

After running alone in the 2012 election, the PDS contested the following elections as part of opposition alliances, Manko Wattu Sénégal in 2017 and Wallu Sénégal in 2022. The party succeeded in gradually increasing its parliamentary representation, up to 24 MPs in 2022, but didn't prevent Macky Sall from forming a government after both elections.

== Election results ==
=== Presidential elections ===
Election	Party candidate	Votes	%	Votes	%	Result
Election	Party candidate	First Round		Second Round		Result
1978	Abdoulaye Wade	174,817	17.8%	—N/a		Lost ✗
1983	Abdoulaye Wade	161,067	14.79%	—N/a		Lost ✗
1988	Abdoulaye Wade	291,869	25.80%	—N/a		Lost ✗
1993	Abdoulaye Wade	415,295	32.03%	—N/a		Lost ✗
2000	Abdoulaye Wade	518,740	31.01%	969,332	58.49%	Won ✓
2007	Abdoulaye Wade	1,914,403	55.90%	—N/a		Won ✓
2012	Abdoulaye Wade	942,327	34.81%	992,556	34.20%	Lost ✗

Wade ran in every presidential election from 1978 to 2012, finally becoming elected President of Senegal in 2000 against incumbent President Abdou Diouf. Wade was reelected in the first round of the 2007 election, but went on to lose the 2012 election to former Prime Minister Macky Sall.

=== National Assembly elections ===
Election	Party leader	Votes	%	Seats	+/–	Position	Outcome
1978	Abdoulaye Wade	172,948	17.88%	18 / 100	New	▲2nd	Opposition
1983	Abdoulaye Wade	150,785	13.97%	8 / 120	▼10	2nd	Opposition
1988	Abdoulaye Wade	275,552	24.74%	17 / 120	▲9	2nd	Opposition
1993	Abdoulaye Wade	321,585	30.21%	27 / 120	▲10	2nd	Opposition
1998	Abdoulaye Wade	233,287	19.1%	23 / 140	▼4	2nd	Opposition
2001 (Note: Run within Sopi Coalition.)	Abdoulaye Wade	931,617	49.6%	89 / 120	▲66	▲1st	Coalition (Sopi Coalition)
2007 (Note: Run within Sopi 2007 coalition.)	Abdoulaye Wade	1,190,609	69.21%	131 / 150	▲42	1st	Coalition (Sopi 2007)
2012	Abdoulaye Wade	298,846	15.23%	12 / 150	▼113	▼2nd	Opposition
2017 (Note: Run within Manko Wattu Sénégal coalition.)	Abdoulaye Wade	552,095	16.68%	19 / 165	▲7	2nd	Opposition
2022 (Note: Run within Wallu Sénégal coalition.)	Abdoulaye Wade	471,517	14.46%	24 / 165	▲5	▼3rd	Opposition
2024 (Note: Run as part of the Takku Wallu Sénégal coalition.)	Abdoulaye Wade	531,466	14.67%	16 / 165	▼8	▲2nd	Opposition

== See also ==
- Liberal Pupils and Students Movement
