= Sopi Coalition =

Political alliance in Senegal

The Sopi Coalition was the governing political alliance in Senegal during the presidency of Abdoulaye Wade. The alliance was composed of the Senegalese Democratic Party (PDS) and smaller parties. Wade was the Secretary-General of the PDS.

The alliance's name came from large crowds chanting "Sopi! Sopi!" at Wade's rallies during his successful campaign for president in 2000. "Sopi" is the Wolof word for "change."

In the April 2001 parliamentary election, the Sopi Coalition won 49.59% of the popular vote and 89 out of 120 seats in the National Assembly. Six years later, in the parliamentary election of 3 June 2007 (which was boycotted by most of the opposition), the Sopi Coalition 2007 won 69.21% of the popular vote and 131 out of 150 seats.
