= Abdoulaye Wade =

President of Senegal from 2000 to 2012

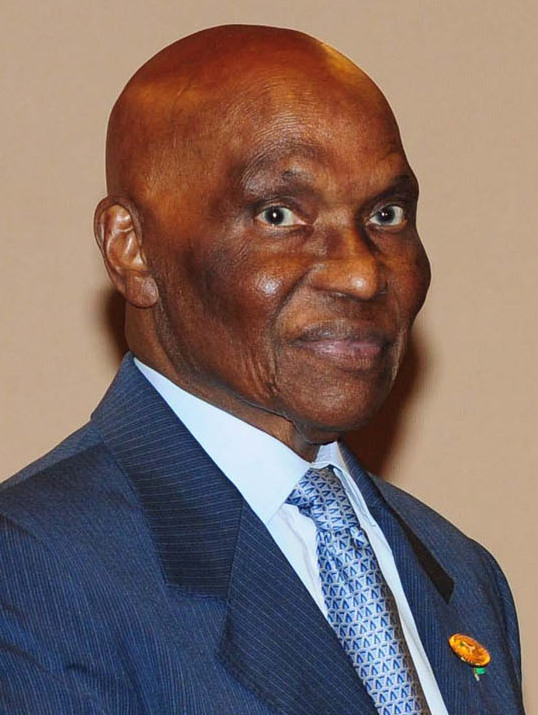
- Wade in 2011

3rd President of Senegal
- In office 1 April 2000 – 2 April 2012
- Prime Minister: Moustapha Niasse; Mame Madior Boye; Idrissa Seck; Macky Sall; Cheikh Hadjibou Soumaré; Souleymane Ndéné Ndiaye
- Preceded by: Abdou Diouf
- Succeeded by: Macky Sall

Secretary-General of the Senegalese Democratic Party
- Incumbent
- Assumed office 31 July 1974
- Preceded by: Party established

Personal details
- Born: 29 May 1926 (age 100) Kébémer, French Senegal (now Senegal)
- Party: Senegalese Democratic Party
- Spouse: Viviane Vert (m. 1963)
- Children: 2, including Karim

Abdoulaye Wade (French pronunciation: [abdulaj wad], Wolof: Abdulaay Wàdd; born 29 May 1926) is a Senegalese politician who served as the third president of Senegal from 2000 to 2012. He is also the Secretary-General of the Senegalese Democratic Party (PDS), having led the party since it was founded in 1974. Assuming office at 73, Wade was the oldest person to occupy the post.

A long-time opposition leader, Wade ran for president four times, beginning in 1978, before he was finally elected in the year 2000. He won re-election in 2007 with a majority in the first round, but was defeated in the second round in 2012 in a controversial bid for a third term. Wade also holds French citizenship.

== Early life ==
Wade was born in Kébémer, Senegal, on 29 May 1926 into a Wolof family from Gandiol and Waalo. Officially, he was born in 1926, although some claim he was born several years earlier, and the record-keeping of the time is not considered particularly reliable. He studied and taught law at the Lycée Condorcet in France. He holds two doctorates in law and economics. He was also dean of the law and economics faculty at the University of Dakar in Senegal.

== Political career ==
At a summit of the Organization of African Unity in Mogadishu in 1974, Wade told President Léopold Sédar Senghor that he wanted to start a new party, and Senghor agreed to this. The PDS was founded on 31 July 1974. The party—initially intended as a Labour party—adopted liberalism in 1976 due to the introduction of a law permitting the existence of only three parties with three distinct ideologies, two of which were taken by other parties (liberalism was therefore the only remaining option). Wade first ran for President in February 1978 against Senghor, taking 17.38% of the vote. Senghor gave Wade the nickname "Diombor" (Wolof for hare). Also in 1978, Wade was elected to the National Assembly, where he served until 1980. Wade attracted international attention in the wake of Senghor's announcement in late 1980 that he would resign; as the Secretary General of the PDS, he issued a statement denouncing the process and calling instead for the army to oversee a new set of elections. Subsequently he ran in the presidential elections of 1983 and 1988, taking second place each time, behind Senghor's successor Abdou Diouf. Following the 1988 election, he was arrested due to protests against the results and received a suspended sentence. Subsequently he went to France, but returned in 1990.

In April 1991, Wade and four other PDS members joined a national unity government together with the ruling Socialist Party (PS); Wade became Minister of State without portfolio. In October 1992, he and the other PDS ministers quit the government due to complaints about the manner in which the PS was said to control the government. In the February 1993 presidential election, Wade again took second place, with 32% of the vote, behind Diouf, who won with 58%. Following the May 1993 killing of Constitutional Council Vice-President Babacar Sèye, Wade, along with other PDS leaders, faced police questioning. On 1 October, Wade, his wife, and two PDS members of the National Assembly (Abdoulaye Faye and Ousmane Ngom), were charged with complicity in the murder, although they were not held in custody or put on trial. Following riots in February 1994, Wade was arrested along with many others for allegedly threatening state security. The charge of complicity in Sèye's murder was dismissed in May 1994, and Wade and his co-defendants began a hunger strike on 30 June. He and his co-defendants were released on 4 July, and the remaining charges were dismissed on 30 August 1994.

Wade rejoined the government as Minister of State in March 1995, but he and the other PDS ministers left again in March 1998. Although he was elected to the National Assembly in the February 1998 parliamentary election, he announced his resignation from the National Assembly in late July 1998, saying that there were "enough deputies to do the job in my place".

== Presidency (2000–2012) ==
=== 2000 election and first term ===
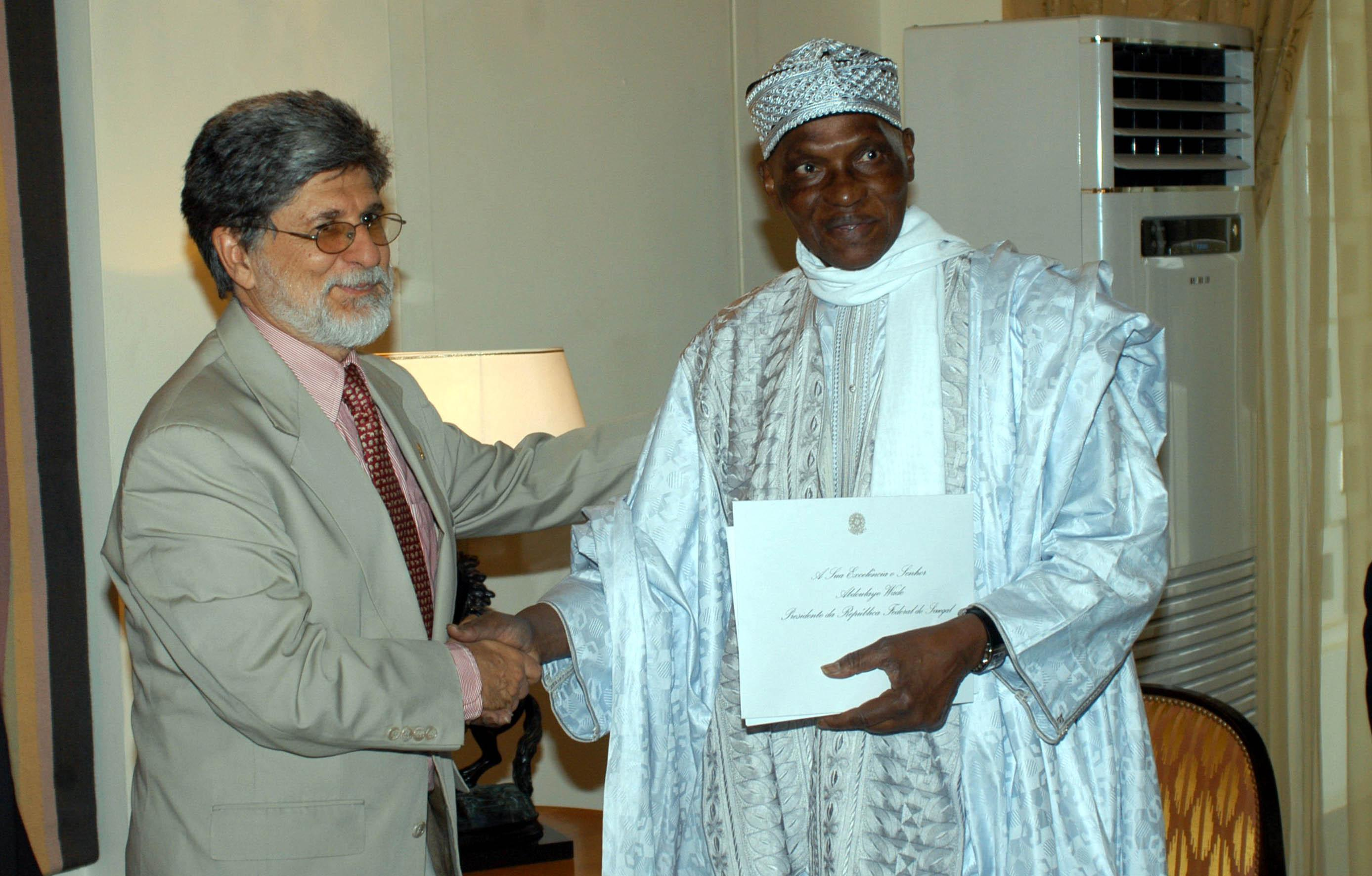
Wade and the Brazilian Foreign Minister Celso Amorim, in 2005

Wade subsequently spent a year in France, returning to Senegal in October 1999. In the first round of the 2000 presidential election, held on 27 February, he again took second place, receiving 31% of the vote, but for the first time, Diouf did not win a first round majority, and consequently a second round was held on 19 March. Wade won this round with 58.49% of the vote, having received the support of candidates from the first round, including third place candidate Moustapha Niasse. Wade became President on 1 April 2000 and appointed Niasse as his Prime Minister shortly afterwards. Wade initially cohabited with the PS, which held a majority in the legislature until the PDS and its allies (the Sopi Coalition) won a majority in the April 2001 parliamentary election.

A new constitution was adopted in 2001, reducing presidential terms to five years following the completion of Wade's seven-year term in 2007.

In September 2002, Wade received the World Peace Culture Award.

In December 2004, he signed a peace accord with rebels in Casamance after 22 years of war with rebels.

=== 2007 election and second term ===
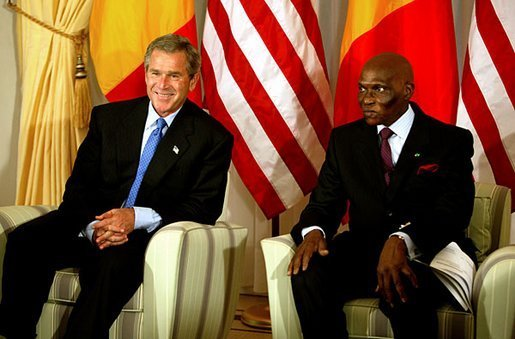
Wade with President of the United States George W. Bush in July 2003

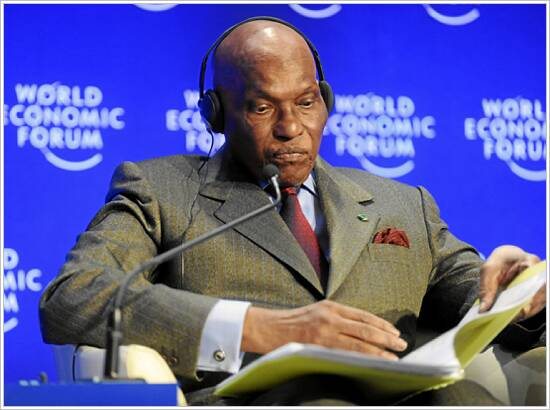
At the World Economic Forum Annual Meeting 2009

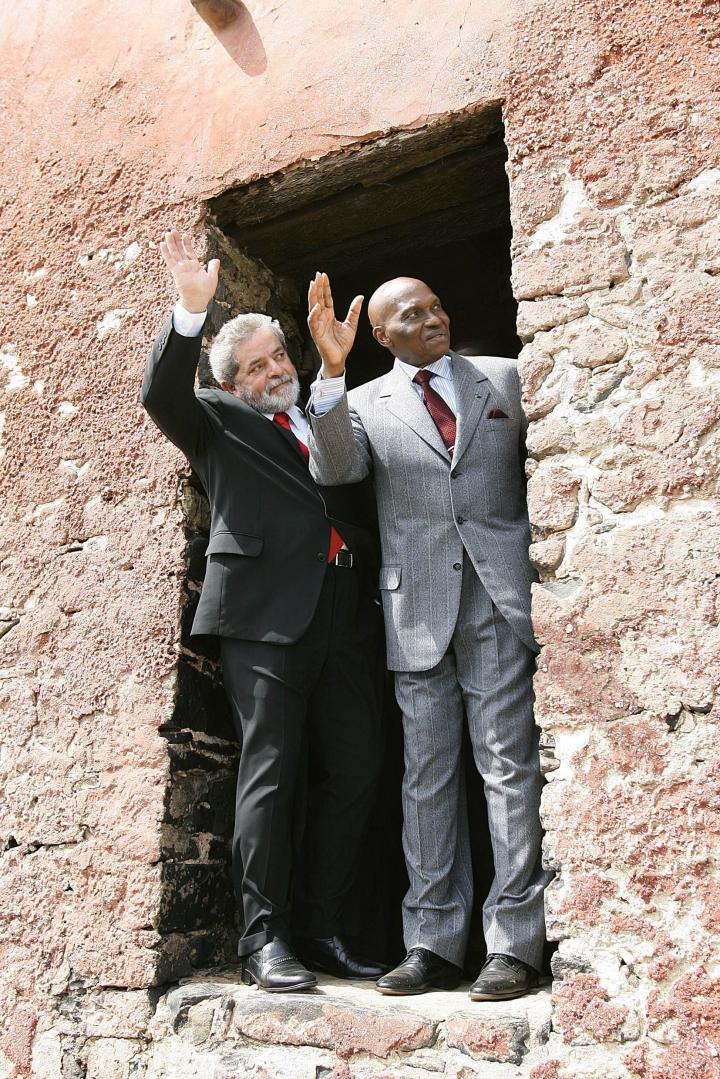
President of Brazil Lula da Silva and Wade, in April 2005

On 15 October 2006, Wade was nominated as presidential candidate of the PDS for the February 2007 presidential election. One of Wade's opponents in this election was his former prime minister Idrissa Seck, who was once considered Wade's protégé, but was arrested in 2005. Final results released on 11 March 2007, showed Wade winning in the first round with 55.9% of the vote, far ahead of his nearest opponents, Seck with about 15% and Socialist Party leader Ousmane Tanor Dieng with about 13.6%. Dieng and another opposition candidate, Abdoulaye Bathily, filed appeals regarding the election, but these were rejected by the Constitutional Council. Wade was sworn in for his second term on 3 April at the Leopold Sedar Senghor Stadium in Dakar, with many African leaders and about 60,000 spectators in attendance.

The main opposition parties did not accept Wade's 2007 victory and disputed his legitimacy as President; they boycotted elections to the National Assembly and the re-established Senate later in the year. Wade conclusively stated in an interview published by Le Soleil on 19 May 2008 that there was no longer any possibility of dialogue with the opposition unless it recognized him as the legitimate President. "Let them do what they want, it doesn't bother me," he said of the opposition, "so long as they respect law and order."

At the July 2007 African Union summit in Accra, Ghana, Wade supported quick formation of the proposed United States of Africa and said: "If we fail to unite, we will become weak, and if we live isolated in countries that are divided, we face the risk of collapsing in the face of stronger and united economies."

In March 2008 in the country of Comoros, the island of Anjouan decided to declare independence. Senegal would send troops to the islands of Comoros. Comoros, along with multiple African Union countries, would win the invasion.

=== 2012 election for third term ===
In July 2008, the National Assembly approved a constitutional amendment increasing the length of the presidential term to seven years, as it was prior to the adoption of the 2001 constitution. This extension would not apply to Wade's 2007–2012 term, but Minister of Justice Madické Niang stressed on this occasion that Wade could potentially run for re-election in 2012 if he was still healthy. Later, on 17 September 2009, Wade confirmed that he planned to run for a third term in 2012 "if God gives me a long life".

Wade, during a 14 July 2011 speech to supporters, used the Wolof phrase "Ma waxoon waxeet" ("I said it, I (can) take it back") in explaining his decision to go back on his 2007 pledge not to run for another term. The phrase subsequently became a popular rallying cry for the anti-Wade opposition.

On 27 January 2012, he was officially approved by the Constitutional Council to run for a highly controversial third term. Following this declaration, enraged mobs engaged in violent protests throughout the city. After the first round vote, Abdoulaye Wade acknowledged on 27 February 2012 that he had failed to win a majority in the election and would have to face a run-off. He subsequently lost the second round of voting, held on 25 March 2012, to the opposition candidate Macky Sall; Sall had received the backing of all of the candidates who were defeated in the first round, and he defeated Wade by a wide margin.

Wade was internationally praised for his handling of the 2012 presidential election, after congratulating his opponent on his victory and peacefully stepping down. Wade's quick concession was praised by the African Union, European Union, United Nations and the United States. It was pointed out that the leaders ruling some of Senegal's neighbors (including Guinea, Gambia and Guinea-Bissau) had all previously used the army to maintain their grasp on power. Because of this, Wade is considered among the rare African leaders who are committed to democracy. Sall succeeded Wade as President on 2 April 2012.

== Post-presidency (2012–present) ==
Following his defeat in the presidential election, Wade remained at the helm of the PDS, even as a number of the party's key figures abandoned it. He chose not to stand as a candidate for the July 2012 parliamentary election. The PDS won 12 seats in the vote, marking a tremendous decrease in the party's parliamentary representation, but Wade nevertheless said that he viewed the outcome as encouraging. He said that, contrary to expectations from some quarters that the PDS would disappear after losing power, it had emerged from the vote as the largest opposition party and the only one with enough seats to form a parliamentary group.

In 2015, despite being close to his 90th birthday, Wade brushed aside suggestions that he should retire, arguing that no credible younger men had come along to succeed him as head of the PDS and that his parents both lived and worked to an advanced age.

In the July 2017 parliamentary election, Wade planned to stand as a candidate at the head of the candidate list of an opposition coalition. Khalifa Sall, another prominent opposition leader, and his supporters decided to run separately due to disagreement about whether Wade or Sall should receive the top spot on the candidate list. The divided opposition performed poorly in the election; the coalition backing President Sall won 125 seats, a majority, while Wade's coalition trailed distantly in second place with 19 seats. As the top candidate on his coalition's candidate list, Wade himself won a seat, although he had no intention of actually serving as a Deputy; he announced his resignation on 10 September 2017, before the National Assembly even began meeting. He explained that his purpose in running was merely to support his coalition in the election.

As of 2019, Wade, although his power has waned somewhat, remains the Secretary-General of the Senegalese Democratic Party (PDS) and still exercises considerable influence within the party.

In the July 2017 parliamentary election, the Wades and the PDS joined a large opposition alliance, in particular with Ousmane Sonko's Pastef and Khalifa Sall's Taxawu Senegaal. However, Abdoulaye Wade decided to quickly leave this coalition in September 2021 and recreate a coalition (Wallu Senegal) that brought together roughly the same parties as the winning Manko Wattu coalition formed for the 2017 legislative elections. These local elections were a failure for the PDS, which failed to assert itself and found itself marginalized, while at the same time, the coalition led by Ousmane Sonko and Khalifa Sall asserted itself in major cities (Dakar, Ziguinchor, Kaolack).

Wade turned 100 years old in 2026. The Senegalese government held a series of official events commemorating the event, including a conference on his legacy in June organized in Dakar.

== Criticism ==
Wade's presidency was marred by allegations of corruption, nepotism and constraints on freedom of the press and other civil liberties.

He was also criticized for excessive spending on what have been described as "prestige projects". This includes commissioning a 160+ foot bronze statue (the African Renaissance Monument), for which Wade claims he is entitled to 35% of all tourist profits it generates because of the intellectual property for conceiving the idea.

In a parallel controversy, Wade has been criticized by Christian bishops in Senegal for publicly denying the divinity of Jesus Christ, comparing him to the statues found in the African Renaissance Monument, after local imams expressed their opposition to the monument. He later regretted that his comments had caused religious offense to Christians.

Wade also received criticism in 2009 for a "goodbye present" he reportedly gave to a departing IMF official after the two had dinner. The present turned out to be a bag of money worth almost US$200,000. Widespread speculation and criticism centered on the possibility that Wade was grooming his son Karim to succeed him.

During the corruption charges levied against his son Karim Wade, Wade held a press conference at his home in 2015 in which he insulted and falsely accused his successor Macky Sall of being a "descendant of slaves", and that Sall's parents were "cannibals" who "ate babies" and "were chased out of the village" for cannibalism. He went on to say that his son (Karim Wade) "will never accept that Macky Sall is above him", and if slavery still existed today in the country, he would have sold Macky Sall into slavery.

During his presidency, Wade's land reform laws targeted the land owning Serer community of Senegal - who have inherited their lands since lamanic times, causing many Serer farmers to lose their lands and livelihood. His land reform was strongly criticised by certain quarters of the Senegalese media.

== Personal life ==
Wade married Viviane Vert in 1963. Their son, Karim Wade, served as head of the national agency of the Islamic Organization Conference, and subsequently was Minister of State for International Cooperation, Urban and Regional Planning, Air Transport, and Infrastructure. Their daughter, Sindjely Wade, worked as a Special Assistant to the President and has participated in many Paris-Dakar rallies.

Wade never renounced his French nationality after the independence of Senegal. Wade, a pious Muslim, is a member of the Sufi Mouride brotherhood. In March 2012, he announced plans to go to Saudi Arabia for a religious pilgrimage.

He turned 100 on 29 May 2026, making him the first state leader in West African history to become a centenarian.

== Honours ==
=== National honours ===
- Senegal:
  - Grand Cross of the National Order of the Lion
  - Grand Cross of the National Order of Merit

=== Foreign honours ===
- France
  - Grand Officier of the Order of Legion of Honour
- Finland
  - Grand Cross with Collar of the Order of the White Rose of Finland (2009)
- Monaco
  - Grand Cross of the Order of Saint-Charles (9 November 2009)
- Morocco
  - Grand Cordon of the Order of the Throne (2000)
- UAE
  - Collar of the Order of Zayed (22 February 2004)

Political offices
Preceded by Abdou Diouf	President of Senegal; 2000–2012	Succeeded by Macky Sall
Diplomatic posts
Preceded by Alpha Oumar Konaré	Chairperson of the Economic Community of West African States; 2001–2003	Succeeded by John Kufuor
