= List of ministers of the interior of Senegal =

List of ministers of the interior of Senegal:

- Valdiodio Ndiaye
- Mamadou Dia
- Ousmane Alioune Sylla
- Doudou Thiam
- Abdoulaye Fofana
- Amadou Cissé Dia
- Amadou Clédor Sall
- Jean Collin
- Médoune Fall
- Ibrahima Wone
- Jean Collin
- André Sonko
- Famara Ibrahima Sagna
- Madieng Khary Dieng
- Djibo Leyti Kâ
- Abdourahmane Sow
- Lamine Cissé
- Mamadou Niang
- Macky Sall
- Cheikh Saadibou Fall
- Ousmane Ngom
- Cheikh Tidiane Sy
- Bécaye Diop
- Mbaye Ndiaye
- Général Pathé Seck
- Abdoulaye Daouda Diallo
- Aly Ngouille Ndiaye
- Mamadou Niang

== See also ==
- Interior ministry
- Politics of Senegal
