= List of ministers of the armed forces (Senegal) =

This is a list of ministers of the armed forces of the Republic of Senegal (French: Ministres des Forces Armées de la République du Sénégal):

== Key ==
Political parties

Socialist Party of Senegal (PSS)
Alliance of the Forces of Progress (AFP)
Senegalese Democratic Party (PDS)
Alliance for the Republic (APR)

Other factions

Independent

Minister	Party	Title	Start	End
Presidency of Léopold Sédar Senghor
Valdiodio Ndiaye	UPS	Minister of the Interior, provisionally charged with Defense	September 1960	3 May 1961
Mamadou Dia	UPS	President of the council, Minister of National Defense	13 May 1961	19 December 1962
Amadou Cissé Dia	UPS	Minister of Armed Forces	19 December 1962	9 December 1963
Amadou Cissé Dia	UPS	Minister of Armed Forces	9 December 1963	February 1964
Amadou Cissé Dia	UPS	Minister of Armed Forces	February 1964	13 June 1966
Amadou Karim Gaye	UPS	Minister of Armed Forces	16 June 1966	15 June 1966
Amadou Karim Gaye	UPS	Minister of Armed Forces	15 June 1966	9 March 1968
Amadou Karim Gaye	UPS	Minister of Armed Forces	9 March 1968	6 June 1968
Léopold Sédar Senghor	UPS	President filling the office of minister of Armed Forces	25 June 1968	14 September 1970
Abdou Diouf	UPS	Prime minister filling the office of minister of Armed Forces	14 September 1969	19 June 1972
Magatte Lô		Minister of State charged with Armed Forces	19 June 1972	16 February 1974
Amadou Clédor Sall	UPS / PS	Minister of Armed Forces	16 February 1974	21 November 1975
Amadou Clédor Sall	UPS / PS	Minister of Armed Forces	21 November 1975	5 January 1981
Presidency of Abdou Diouf
Daouda Sow	PS	Minister of Armed Forces	5 January 1981	3 April 1983
Médoune Fall		Minister of Armed Forces	3 April 1983	1 May 1983
Médoune Fall		Minister of Armed Forces	1 May 1983	2 June 1993
Madieng Khary Dieng	PS	Minister of Armed Forces	2 June 1993	15 March 1995
Cheikh Hamidou Kane Mathiara	PS	Minister of Armed Forces	15 March 1995	4 July 1998
Cheikh Hamidou Kane Mathiara	PS	Minister of Armed Forces	4 July 1998	3 April 2000
Presidency of Abdoulaye Wade
Youba Sambou	PDS	Minister of Armed Forces	3 April 2000	4 March 2001
Youba Sambou	PDS	Minister of Armed Forces	4 March 2001	2 October 2002
Mame Madior Boye	PDS	Prime minister, exercising the function of Minister of Armed Forces armées	2 October 2002	4 November 2002
Bécaye Diop	PDS	Minister of Armed Forces	6 November 2002	21 April 2004
Bécaye Diop	PDS	Minister of Armed Forces	21 April 2004	23 November 2006
Bécaye Diop	PDS	Minister of Armed Forces	23 November 2006	19 June 2007
Bécaye Diop	PDS	Minister of State, Minister of Armed Forces	19 June 2007	1 May 2009
Bécaye Diop	PDS	Minister of State, Minister of Armed Forces	1 May 2009	14 October 2009
Abdoulaye Baldé	PDS	Minister of State, Minister of Armed Forces	15 October 2009	10 September 2010
Bécaye Diop	PDS	Minister of State, Minister of Armed Forces	11 September 2010	3 December 2011
Moustapha Sourang	PDS	Minister of State, Minister of Armed Forces	4 December 2011	3 April 2012
Presidency of Macky Sall
Augustin Tine	APR	Minister of Armed Forces	4 April 2012	1 September 2013
Augustin Tine	APR	Minister of Armed Forces	2 September 2013	6 July 2014
Augustin Tine	APR	Minister of Armed Forces	6 July 2014	7 September 2017
Augustin Tine	APR	Minister of Armed Forces	7 September 2017	5 April 2019
Sidiki Kaba		Minister of Armed Forces	5 April 2019	14 May 2019
Sidiki Kaba		Minister of Armed Forces	14 May 2019	1 November 2020
Sidiki Kaba		Minister of Armed Forces	1 November 2020	In Office

== See also ==
- Ministry of Defense (Senegal)
