= Cheikh Tidiane Sy =

Senegalese politician

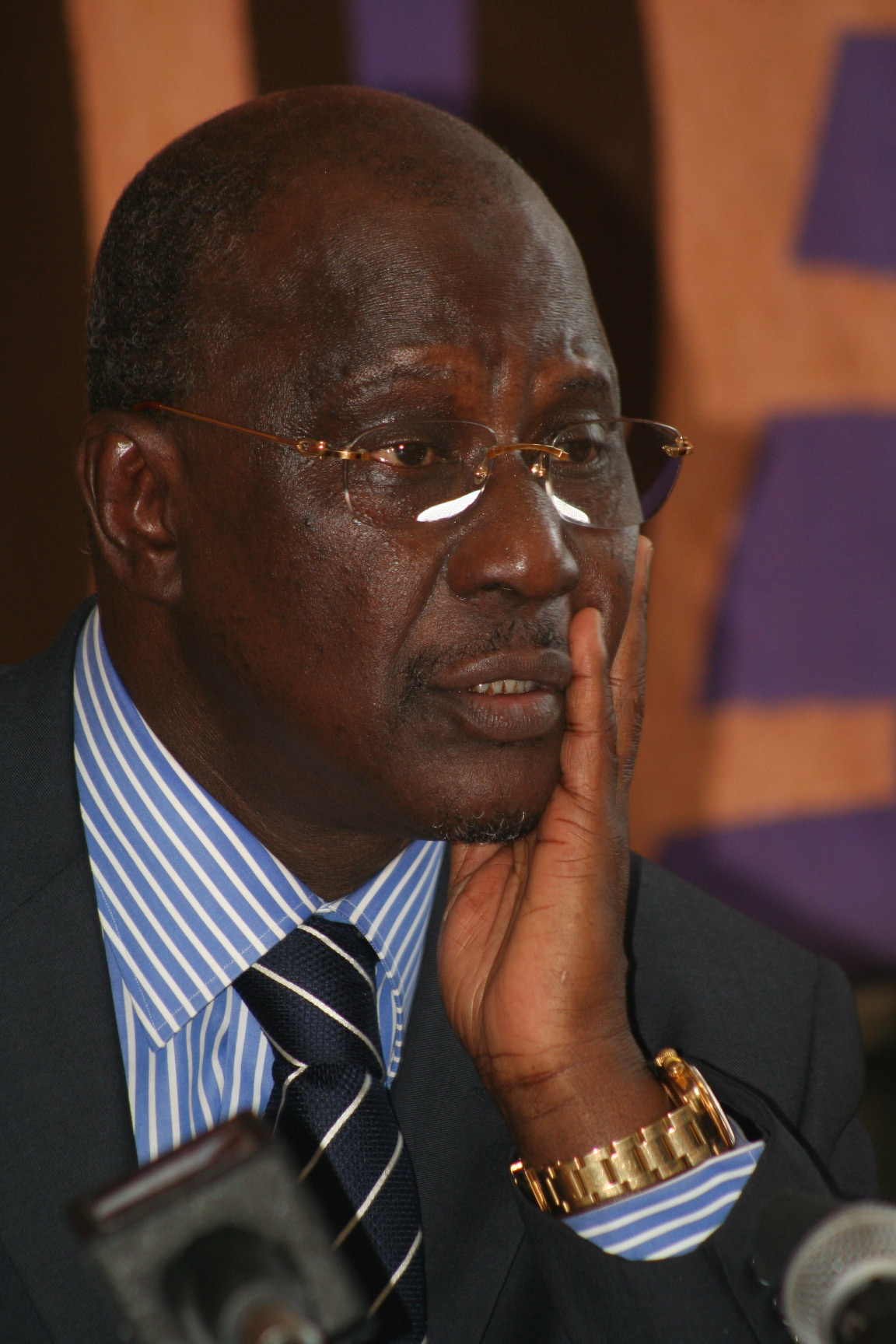

Minister of State for Justice
- In office 18 May 2005 – 19 June 2007
- President: Abdoulaye Wade
- Prime Minister: Macky Sall
- Preceded by: Serigne Lamine Diop

Minister of State for the Interior
- In office 19 June 2007 – 14 October 2009
- President: Abdoulaye Wade
- Prime Minister: Cheikh Hadjibou Soumaré, Souleymane Ndéné Ndiaye
- Preceded by: Ousmane Ngom
- Succeeded by: Bécaye Diop

Personal details
- Born: 11 January 1938 (age 88) Saint-Louis, Saint-Louis Region, French West Africa (AOF)
- Party: Senegalese Democratic Party (PDS)
- Profession: Professor of Sociology and Development; Diplomat

Cheikh Tidiane Sy (born 11 January 1938) is a Senegalese politician and official. During the presidency of Abdoulaye Wade, he was Minister of Justice from 2005 to 2008, Minister of the Interior from 2008 until October 2009, then Minister of Justice once more, from 2010 to 2012.

== Early life ==
After completing his studies at the North school and the Faidherbe lycée in Saint-Louis, Sy was a school headmaster in Popenguine from 1957 to 1959. From July 1959 until August 1961, he was head of the Central Bureau of Rural Administration in the Ministry of Planning and Development.

From September 1961 to December 1965, he reprised his studies, in France, at the Collège coopératif on rue Las Cases in Paris, at the School for Advanced Studies in the Social Sciences and in the Faculty of Literature and Human Sciences at the Sorbonne. He received a diploma from the Collège coopératif of Paris, a diploma from the School for Advanced Studies in the Social Sciences, a bachelor's in arts (English), and a doctorate from the École pratique des hautes études with a thesis entitled "Moorish Traditionalism and Rural Modernisation in Senegal: Contribution to the Study of Links between Socialism and Islam in Under-Developed Countries."

From December 1965 to June 1966, Sy was professor of the sociology of development and director of studies at the École nationale d'économie appliquée (ENEA) in Dakar, Senegal. From July 1966 to July 1968, he was a research associate at the Centre for African Studies at the University of California, Los Angeles (UCLA). From July 1968 to June 1970, he was the cultural advisor of the Senegalese embassy in Great Britain. From July 1970 to March 1972, he was Secretary General of the Association of African Universities in Accra, Ghana.

== International organisations ==
=== UNESCO ===
Sy then entered UNESCO in Paris. From April 1972 to February 1975, he was in programme co-ordinator for the higher education division. From October 1974 to February 1975, he was co-director for the African region of the Bellagio project for higher education and development. From February 1975 to June 1975, he was programme co-ordinator for the educational personnel division. From June 1975 to January 1978, he was programme co-ordinator in the politics, education, and planning divisions of UNESCO/World Bank.

From January 1978 to July 1978, Sy was a consultant at USAID in Washington DC for the Sahel development programme.

In July 1978, Sy returned to Senegal to take up the position of director of École nationale d'économie appliquée (ENEA) in Daker. He held this position until June 1988. He left Senegal in July 1988 to become personal foreign affairs advisor to Mobutu Sese Seko, President of Zaire.

From January 1990 until May 1995, Sy was principal advisor at ACG Africa, Senegal (politics and planning). Then he was principal consultant at AMEX International, Washington DC (democracy and governance) and principal consultant at the IMD Group, Alexandria VA (evaluation of projects and professional training) until November.

=== United Nations ===
Sy was employed by the United Nations from May 1995 until November 1995 as head of political and humanitarian affairs for the northeastern sector, in the United Nations mission in Bosnia-Herzegovina. Then, until August 1996, he was adjunct-director of civil and political affairs. Between September 1996 and February 1997, he was the principal political advisor of the Special Representative of the Secretary General of the United Nations in Burundi. Between January 1997 and May 2000, Sy himself was the Special Representative in Burundi. From June 2000 to June 2001, he was Special Representative of the Secretary General and Head of the UN Office in the Central African Republic.

== Senegal ==
In 2000, Abdoulaye Wade, a close friend of Sy, succeeded Abdou Diouf as President of Senegal. From October 2001 until November 2002, Sy was president of the administrative board of the Banque Internationale pour le Commerce et l'Industrie du Sénégal (BICIS). From June 2002 until August 2003, he was President of the Saint-Louis Regional Council.

From 27 August 2003 until 18 May 2005, he was Minister of State at the Presidency. Beginning on 18 May 2005, he was Minister of State for Justice in the governments of Prime Minister Macky Sall and then Minister of the Interior in Cheikh Hadjibou Soumaré's government. Subsequently, he was Minister of State for the Interior in Souleymane Ndéné Ndiaye's government. Bécaye Diop replaced him in this role in October 2009.

Sy was named president of the administrative board of the Société africaine de raffinage (SAR) on 18 November 2009. He was appointed as Minister of Justice again in June 2010. He was removed from these positions on 8 May 2011 and then re-appointed on 11 May, remaining in office until Abdoulaye Wade's defeat in the 2012 presidential election.

== Publications ==
- « Rural modernization in Senegal » in Nation by design, Doubleday, New York City, 1968
- « La confrérie sénégalaise des Mourides » (The Senegalese Brotherhood of the Mourides), Présence africaine, Paris, 1969
- « Ahmadou Bamba et l’islamisation des Wolofs » (Ahmadou Bamba and the Islamisation of the Wolofs), Bulletin de l’IFAN, vol.XXXII, 1970
- « L’épopée extraordinaire d’Ahmadou Bamba » (The Extraordinary Poetry of Ahmadou Bamba), Second International Congress of Africanists, Présence africaine, 1972
- Enseignement supérieur et développement au Zaïre (Higher Education and Development in Zaire), Étude sectorielle de l’éducation au Zaïre, UNESCO, 1976
- The Malian model of higher education in the Netherlands Antilles, UNESCO, June 1976 (Co–editor)
- « Éducation, développement endogène et identité culturelle en Afrique » (Education,, Local Development and Cultural Identity in Africa), Seminar paper, UNESCO 1976
- « Mouridisme et idéologie du travail » (Mouridism and the Ideology of Labour) in Éthiopiques, Dakar, 1976
- Crise du développement rural et désengagement de l’État au Sénégal (Crisis of Rural Development and the Disengagement of the State in Senegal), Nouvelles éditions africaines, Dakar, 1988 (Editor)

== See also ==
- List of ministers of the interior of Senegal
- Politics of Senegal

== Bibliography ==
- Les élites africaines : Cameroun, RCA, Congo, Côte d'Ivoire, Dahomey, Gabon, Haute-Volta, Mali, Mauritanie, Niger, Sénégal, Tchad, Togo, Ediafric, Paris, 1979 (5th ed.), p. 374
