= Movement of Democratic Forces of Casamance in Senegal =

Separatist movement in Casamance, Senegal

Movement of Democratic Forces of Casamance
- Mouvement des forces démocratiques de Casamance
- Flag of the MFDC
- Leaders: Augustin Diamacoune Senghor (until 2007); Mamadou Nkrumah Sané; Leopold Sagna (until 2000); Sidy Badji; Salif Sadio; César Atoute Badiate; Mamadou Niantang Diatta
- Dates active: 1982–present
- Active regions: Casamance, Senegal, Guinea-Bissau, The Gambia
- Ideology: Casamance nationalism; Jola interests
- Wars: Casamance conflict & the Guinea-Bissau Civil War

The Movement of Democratic Forces of Casamance (French: Mouvement des forces démocratiques de Casamance; MFDC) is the main separatist movement in the Casamance region of Senegal.

The modern MFDC was founded in 1982 under the leadership of Father Augustin Diamacoune Senghor to push for the independence of Casamance. It is named after a political organization that was founded during French rule of Senegal in 1949 by Emile Badiane and Ibou Diallo before being integrated into the Senegalese Democratic Bloc in 1954. The MFDC's armed wing was formed in 1985 and is called Atika (Jola for "warrior").

The MFDC has fought against the Government of Senegal in the Casamance conflict. Despite various peace agreements, factional splits within the MFDC have resulted in continued conflict.

== Background ==
The MFDC operates in the Casamance region of southern Senegal, which is south of the border with The Gambia. Casamance was the last part of Senegal to be conquered by Europeans in 1903. The Jola, an ethnic minority making up about 4% of Senegal, are primarily concentrated in this region.

In addition to ethnic differences, Casamance is widely viewed by separatists as having been neglected by the Senegalese government. Separatist narratives argue that northern elites have exploited resources from the rivers and forests of Casamance, and state policies like the cutting of funding for boarding schools in the 1970s further upset those in the region.

Map of Casamance

The MFDC claims to represent all ethnic groups, but Jola tradition is key to their efforts to build identity. The MFDC's armed wing, Atika, has been known to take sacred oaths as part of their initiation, which plays off of traditional Jola rites. Casamance is predominantly Muslim, but many locals have also retained traditional Jola religious beliefs. While Diamacoune Senghor was a Catholic priest, the MFDC's leadership has consisted of both Muslims and Christians, and some members of the MFDC are considered Awasena, meaning they follow Jola religious traditions. However, nobody in public leadership positions is known to be Awasena.

== History ==
=== Original MFDC (1949-1954) ===
The original MFDC was founded in 1949 during French rule of Senegal by schoolteachers Emile Badiane and Ibou Diallo as a regional political movement. Both founders were locals of the Casamance region, with Badiane being from a village close to Bignona and Diallo being from Sedhiou. The original MFDC sought to "rectify our local politics and militate as an intellectual community to raise, study, and solve the various local problems in a general framework, without, however, impeding or creating obstacles to issues of interest to Senegal as a whole or another region of the Colony".

This MFDC allied with Léopold Sédar Senghor's Senegalese Democratic Bloc (BDS), and in March 1952 elections, five of eight conseillers, or local officials under French rule, elected in Casamance were members of the MFDC. However, ensuing tensions between the MFDC and BDS resulting from MFDC conseillers feeling they were deprived of prestigious positions resulted in the MFDC deciding at a November 1953 convention in Marsassoum to remain autonomous, but still collaborate with the BDS on crucial issues until the 1957 elections.

At a June 1954 MFDC convention in Bignona, MFDC leaders agreed to fully join the BDS, marking the end of the MFDC as an independent organization. In response to this decision, a group of upset young MFDC supporters founded the Mouvement Autonome de Casamance (MAC), but the MAC dissolved in September 1957.

=== Modern MFDC (1982-Present) ===
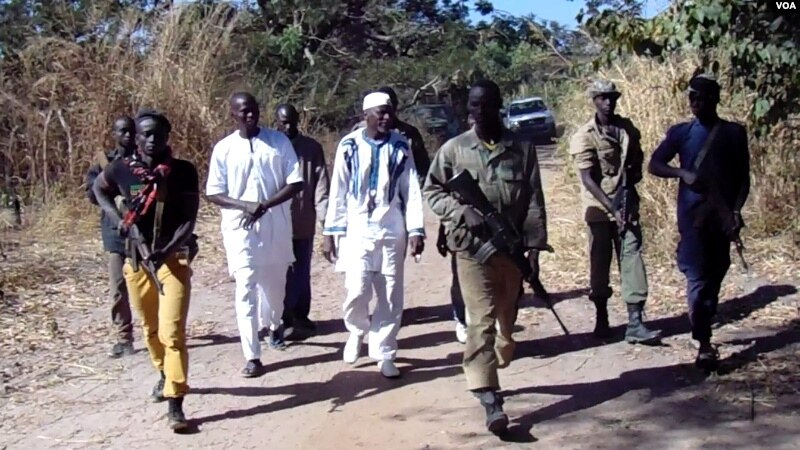
Photo of MFDC fighters

On December 26, 1982, the newly-formed, modern MFDC organized its first pro-independence demonstration, in which they replaced Senegalese flags in the city of Ziguinchor with white flags symbolizing independence. Protestors were able to reach the governor's office and place a white flag there, and leaflets calling for Casamance independence began to circulate. Their leader Augustin Diamacoune Senghor was amongst 32 people arrested and sentenced to prison for involvement in these demonstrations.

On December 6, 1983, three gendarmes were killed while intervening in a MFDC meeting close to Ziguinchor. Soon after, on December 18, 1983, in what MFDC members call "Red Sunday", MFDC demonstrators and security forces clashed, and MFDC sources claim that 200 demonstrators were killed.

In 1985, Atika, the MFDC's armed wing, was formed. In 1990, Atika fully mobilized under the leadership of Sidy Badji and launched their first military campaign, which was a surprise attack on a border post in Séléty by the Senegal-Gambia border. Two customs officers were killed, and subsequent attacks on security forces and civil servants along with armed robberies were committed by Atika. In response, President Abdou Diouf attempted to weaken the separatist cause by appointing four ministers from Casamance to his cabinet and splitting Casamance into two administrative regions, Ziguinchor and Kolda.

==== Internal divisions ====
The MFDC has experienced significant internal divisions and the emergence of different factional leaders within Atika. Sidy Badji, Leopold Sagna, Salif Sadio, César Atoute Badiate, and Mamadou Niantang Diatta have been notable leaders of Atika factions. Augustin Diamacoune Senghor, until his death in 2007, and Mamadou Nkrumah Sané have been the primary leaders of the MFDC's political wing.

Following Badji's signing of a May 31, 1991 ceasefire, Badji's followers who observed the ceasefire became known as the Front Nord, but other members of Atika known as the Front Sud disobeyed the ceasefire and notably killed a Casamance Member of Parliament and a rural councillor.

Sagna initially led the Front Sud, but he was dismissed from his role in 1993 and replaced by Sadio after attempting to meet with President Abdou Diouf. In 1997, Sadio attempted to take over Badji's Front Nord camps at the north bank of the Casamance River. In 2000, Sadio had Sagna killed, causing Atika and the political wing of the MFDC to further distance themselves from each other, with Diamacoune Senghor calling for a manhunt of Sadio.

In March 2001, division within the political leadership of the MFDC occurred as well, with Diamacoune Senghor signing a peace agreement that Sané did not approve of. Diamacoune Senghor passed away on January 13, 2007.

In a 2018 interview, Sané, now the Secretary-General of the MFDC, said that he no longer recognizes Sadio's faction of Atika as part of the MFDC.

As of 2021, Sadio and Badiate lead two major factions of Atika. The faction under Sadio, a Muslim Jola, has moved from southern Casamance to the north by the Gambia border, while Badiate, a Christian Jola, leads the faction in the south by the Guinea-Bissau border.

==== Opposition to Niafarang Project ====
Members of the MFDC have taken a vocal stance against the Niafarang Project, a proposed mineral sands mine in the Zinguinchor region of Casamance. 2014 interviews with MFDC representatives showed that they saw the mine as an exploitation of Casamance's resources, with a representative saying, "It's pillage, theft", and that, "All of Casamance will suffer".

== Involvement in peace negotiations ==
Throughout the Casamance conflict, MFDC leaders have been involved in a number of peace processes, but internal divisions have frequently undermined these initiatives.

On May 31, 1991, Badji signed a ceasefire agreement with Senegal's Defence Minister in Cacheu, Guinea-Bissau. However, the Front Sud faction of Atika, who had deviated from Badji's leadership, did not obey this agreement.

In 1993, Diamacoune Senghor agreed to a new ceasefire with Senegal's Minister of Armed Forces, Madieng Khary Dieng. In December 1999, Senegalese Interior Minister Lamine Cisse and Diamacoune Senghor signed a further agreement to immediately halt fighting and abide by the terms of the previous 1993 ceasefire.

In March 2001, Diamacoune Senghor signed another peace agreement and began to push for the state to build a University of Casamance, but Sané did not see the agreement as legitimate.

Further peace agreements in 2004 were signed and allowed the Senegalese government to officially launch the Program of Economic and Social Activities in Casamance (PRAESC), but the Sadio-led Front Sud of Atika still failed to collaborate. The PRAESC was a government-led, multi-sector framework for Casamance aimed at mine clearing, infrastructural recovery, supporting local development, and demobilizing and eventually reintegrating combatants into civilian life. The national committee overseeing the PRAESC was chaired by the Prime Minister and included members of both the MFDC and the Armed Forces of Senegal, in addition to local elected representatives.

In 2014, Sadio declared a unilateral ceasefire following talks in Italy between the Senegalese government and his faction of the MFDC.

On 25 February 2025, Guinea-Bissau's President Umaro Sissoco Embaló announced an agreement between the Senegalese government led by prime minister Ousmane Sonko and the MFDC to end the conflict between them following talks hosted and mediated by Guinea-Bissau. Similar to a previous deal in 2022, the agreement was signed between the Senegalese government and the MFDC's Badiate faction, with the latter again agreeing to disarm. In contrast, the MFDC's Sadio faction did not agree to the deal.

== Foreign relations ==
=== Guinea-Bissau ===
Members of the MFDC were directly involved in the Guinea-Bissau Civil War. On June 7, 1998, a coup erupted in Guinea-Bissau following a dispute over alleged arms sales from the Guinean armed forces to the MFDC. A report following a parliamentary investigation was set to be released on June 8 and absolve President João Bernardo Vieira from blame and incriminate his Chief of Staff, Ansumane Mané. Before the report was released, Mané launched a coup d'état, which was backed militarily by local military personnel and an unknown number of MFDC troops.

President Kumba Yala, who was in power from 2000 to 2003, took a pro-Senegal and anti-MFDC stance, launching an offensive initiative against Atika guerilla forces in the jungle near the Senegal-Guinea-Bissau border and making efforts to block arms supply to MFDC forces.

On May 3, 2013, Badiate's MFDC faction detained twelve humanitarian demining workers from South African firm MECHEM. Senegalese President Macky Sall sought the help of Guinea-Bissau's President Manuel Serifo Nhamadjo, who sent a diplomatic mission of army officers to Badiate. On May 27, with more help from Guinean non-governmental organization Djemberem di cumpo combersa (DDCC), three women were freed. The other nine workers were not freed until July 12 following Barack Obama's visit to Dakar.

Various negotiations involving the MFDC have taken place in Guinea-Bissau including a ceasefire signed on May 31, 1991, in Cacheu by Badji, the 2013 negotiations regarding the removal of land mines in Casamance, and 2022 and 2025 talks resulting in agreements between the Senegalese government and Badiate's MFDC faction.

Members of Atika are known to use religious rituals to ensure their safety. Some of their rituals are of Jola origin, but others come from the Manjaco, Mancagne, Bainounk, and Balanta people whose rituals were used during the Guinea-Bissau War of Independence.

=== The Gambia ===
Former Gambian President Yahya Jammeh, an ethnic Jola, has hosted various meetings aimed at peace in Casamance, but is also believed to have links with and to have supplied arms to the MFDC's Front Nord. In June 2001, Jammeh attempted to unify MFDC forces around Front Nord moderates, but this was unsuccessful.

The MFDC was rumored to have involved itself militarily in the 2016–2017 Gambian constitutional crisis and the subsequent ECOWAS military intervention in the Gambia on Yahya Jammeh's side.

=== Mauritania ===
The Senegalese government accused Mauritanian authorities of supplying Atika with weapons through the Mauritanian embassy in The Gambia, contributing to Senegal and Mauritania breaking diplomatic relations with each other from 1989 to 1992.

=== International mediation ===
In 1993, the Senegalese government and the MFDC agreed to appoint a French arbitrator to evaluate the MFDC's claim that Casamance was an autonomous territory under French colonial rule and therefore had a right to independence upon decolonization. Jacques Charpy, a former colonial administrator in northern Casamance, ultimately concluded that Casamance had never been governed as an autonomous unit, but the MFDC did not accept this conclusion.

On March 20, 2013, Geneva Call, a Swiss-based non-governmental organization supported negotiations between the Senegalese National Anti-Mine Action Centre (CNAMS) and 25 representatives from Badiate's MFDC wing in São Domingos, Guinea-Bissau to discuss the removal of land mines. Although the MFDC understood the need for demining, they argued that demining was dependent on a greater peace process.

On June 7, 2013, following the MFDC detaining twelve demining workers, Geneva Call sent its president to aid subsequent talks, but Badiate argued that demining is not allowed during wartime. Following this, Geneva Call suspended their Casamance work.

== Flag ==

Since 2013, photos indicate that the MFDC - or, at least one of its armed branches - uses a new flag, designed with a different geometrical arrangement of the elements of the flag adopted in 1983. The flag is horizontally divided green-yellow with a red triangle placed along the hoist, charged with a white star tilted to the upper hoist.

== See also ==
- Casamance conflict
- Politics of Senegal
