= Fatou Gaye Sarr =

Senegalese politician (died 2026)

Minister of Agriculture
- In office 30 April 2009 – 24 June 2010
- Prime Minister: Souleymane Ndéné Ndiaye
- Preceded by: Hamath Sall
- Succeeded by: Khadim Gueye

Personal details
- Died: 19 June 2026
- Party: PDS
- Occupation: Agricultural engineer

Fatou Gaye Sarr (died 19 June 2026) was a Senegalese politician of the Senegalese Democratic Party (PDS).

== Life and career ==
A qualified agricultural engineer, Gaye served as Minister-Delegate for Rural Development under the government of Cheikh Hadjibou Soumaré. On 30 April 2009, she became Minister of Agriculture, Pisciculture and Biofuels by Prime Minister Souleymane Ndéné Ndiaye, who had just been appointed by President Abdoulaye Wade. The ministry was renamed to Ministry of Agriculture on 3 December 2009. As minister, she notably launched the Grande offensive agricole pour la nourriture et l'abondance, which sought to provide Senegalese citizens with food self-sufficiency. She also served as a glorified government spokesperson, promoting the government's progress on the offensive and particularly on the distribution of subsidized seeds to farmers. In June 2010, she was removed from the position to serve as Minister of State to the President; she was replaced by Khadim Gueye. She was then dismissed from this post in November 2010 following allegations of mismanagement of funds, for which she was investigated by the Division des investigations criminelles in 2012. However, it was revealed that these allegations resulted from a conspiracy by several Senegalese business interests. She was never summoned for questioning.

== Death ==
Sarr died on 19 June 2026.
