= List of wars involving Senegal =

The following is a list of wars involving Senegal.

Conflict	Combatant 1	Combatant 2	Results
Casamance Conflict (1982– present)	Senegal; Guinea-Bissau (1998–1999, 2021); Turkey (2021, alleged by MFDC)	MFDC: Three main factions (Sadio, Badiatte, and Diatta Groups); Various splinter factions; Guinea-Bissau rebels (1998–1999); Supported by: Guinea-Bissau (2000s, alleged); The Gambia (1994–2017)	Ongoing low-level violence: Unilateral ceasefire by most MFDC factions; MFDC extremely weakened by 2021
Mauritania–Senegal Border War (1989–1991)	Senegal; FLAM	Mauritania; Supported by: Syria; Iraq	Indecisive: Mauritania and Senegal agree to reopen the border and end skirmishes.
Guinea-Bissau Civil War (1998–1999)	Guinea-Bissau; Senegal; Guinea; Supported by: France; Portugal	Military rebels MFDC; Supported by: United States	Defeat: Ousting of President João Bernardo Vieira
Invasion of Anjouan (2008)	African Union: Comoros; Senegal; Sudan; Tanzania; Supported by: France (logistical support); Libyan Arab Jamahiriya (logistical support); United States	Anjouan	Comorian government and African Union victory: Mohamed Bacar flees to Mayotte; Autonomous government of Anjouan is replaced
Intervention in Yemen (2015–present)	Saudi Arabia The Alliance: United Arab Emirates Sudan (2015–19) Bahrain Kuwait Qatar (2015–17) Egypt Jordan Morocco (2015–19) Senegal (Note: soldiers not yet deployed in 2016) South Korea (Note: soldiers not yet deployed in 2018 but did provided intel about Houthis) Academi contractors (2015–16) Saudi-paid Yemeni mercenaries; Supported by: United States; U.S. Navy (Note: logistic support and assistance with the naval blockade of Houthi-held territories in October 2016); United States Army (Special Forces) United Kingdom (Note: training, intelligence, logistical support, weapons, and blockade up to 2017.) France Canada South Korea; National Intelligence Service Malaysia Australia; In support of: Republic of Yemen (Presidential Leadership Council); Yemeni Armed Forces; Yemeni Air Force; Hirak; Popular Resistance Committee; Al-Islah Movement	Revolutionary Committee/Supreme Political Council: Houthi militants; Yemen Army (pro-Saleh and Houthis) (2015–17); Yemeni Republican Guard (2015–17); Allies: Iran (alleged by USA, denied by Iran) North Korea (according to USA and South Korea); Al-Qaeda: AQAP	Ongoing: Houthis dissolve Yemeni government.; Houthis take control of northern Yemen.
ECOWAS military intervention in the Gambia (2017–present)	ECOWAS forces: Senegal; Nigeria; Ghana; Mali (until 2020); Togo; Pro-Barrow forces; Supporters of Coalition 2016; Gambian Navy	Pro-Jammeh forces: Supporters of the Alliance for Patriotic Reorientation and Construction; MFDC; Foreign mercenaries; Protestors against continued ECOWAS presence	Ongoing: Amidst the Gambian constitutional crisis, ECOWAS intervenes in the country militarily (at the request of Adama Barrow) without resistance from pro-Jammeh forces.; Jammeh leaves the country as forces approach Banjul, and Barrow arrives as President days later.; 2,500 ECOWAS troops remain in The Gambia.; Clash between ECOWAS forces and alleged Pro-Jammeh elements in The Gambian military in April 2017.; Protests against continued presence of ECOWAS forces.; Clash between ECOWAS forces and MFDC Senegalese rebels on the Gambia-Senegal border in January 2022.
