= Bécaye Diop =

Senegalese politician

Minister of the Armed Forces of Senegal
- In office 2002–2009
- Preceded by: Youba Sambou
- Succeeded by: Moustapha Sourang

Minister of the Interior of Senegal
- In office 2010–2011
- Preceded by: Cheikh Tidiane Sy
- Succeeded by: Mbaye Ndiaye
- In office 2009–2012

Personal details
- Born: 1945 (age 80–81) Kolda, French West Africa (AOF)
- Citizenship: Senegal
- Party: Senegalese Democratic Party (PDS)
- Profession: Teacher

Bécaye Diop (born 1945) is a Senegalese politician, who is a member of the Senegalese Democratic Party (PDS) and has held several ministerial positions.

== Biography ==
Originally from Fuladu (Upper Casamance), Diop achieved a Certificat d'aptitude professionnelle from the Centre d'apprentissage for vocational training in Ziguinchor in 1961 and then became a schoolteacher, headmaster of an elementary school, and mayor of Kolda.

In 2000, when President Abdoulaye Wade and the Senegalese Democratic Party came to power, he was named ministerial delegate for the ministry of education, in charge of vocational education, professional training, literacy and national languages.

On 1 October 2002, the Minister of the Armed Forces, Youba Sambou was dismissed, following the sinking of the MV Le Joola on 26 September 2002. On 6 November 2002, Bécaye Diop succeeded him as head of the Ministry of the Armed Forces. He retained this role in several successive cabinets (those of Idrissa Seck, Habib Thiam and Cheikh Hadjibou Soumaré). On this extraordinary longevity, he claimed, "The secret of my longevity in government is my loyalty to President Wade ... I have only one objective: to please Wade and to serve him in every way." During a minor reshuffle in 2007, he was also appointed Minister of State.

In October 2009, Abdoulaye Baldé succeeded him as head of the ministry and he was named Minister of the Interior, replacing Cheikh Tidiane Sy. He lost this position in April 2012, as a result of the victory of Macky Sall in the Presidential elections. Mbaye Ndiaye became the new Minister of the Interior.

In 2014, as part of the Benno Bokk Yaakaar coalition, he became mayor of the small town of Ross Béthio.

Bécaye Diop is married and has six children.

== See also ==
- Politics of Senegal
- Armed Forces of Senegal

== Bibliography ==
- Babacar Ndiaye et Waly Ndiaye, Présidents et ministres de la République du Sénégal, Dakar, 2006 (2nd edition), pp. 161.
