= Abdourahmane Sow =

Senegalese politician (1942–2023)

Minister of the Interior of Senegal
- In office 1995 – January 1998
- Preceded by: Djibo Leyti Kâ
- Succeeded by: Lamine Cissé

Personal details
- Born: 14 March 1942 Cambérène, French West Africa
- Died: 15 July 2023 (aged 81) Dakar, Senegal

Abdourahmane Sow (14 March 1942 – 15 July 2023) was a Senegalese politician who was Minister of the Interior of Senegal under the presidency of Abdou Diouf, held the post of chair of the World Scout Committee.

In 1995 he became Minister of the Interior in the third government of Habib Thiam, replacing Djibo Leyti Kâ. General Lamine Cissé succeeded him in January 1998.

In 1998 Sow was appointed Minister of Urban Planning and Habitat in the government of Mamadou Lamine Loum. After being a socialist minister for several years, he was elected Liberal deputy of Louga to the National Assembly, of which he became the fourth vice-president.

Sow was married and had 6 children. He died on 15 July 2023, at the age of 81.

World Organization of the Scout Movement
Preceded by Neil M. Westaway	Chair, World Scout Committee; 1996–1999	Succeeded by Garnet de la Hunt
