= Mlomp (disambiguation) =

Mlomp is a locality in Oussouye Department, Casamance, Senegal.

Mlomp can also refer to:

- Mlomp, Bignona, a locality in Bignona Department, Casamance, Senegal
- The Mlomp language, a language mostly spoken in Mlomp, Bignona
