= École primaire supérieure Blanchot =

Secondary school in Senegal

The Blanchot Higher Primary School – also known as EPS Blanchot or, more commonly, École Blanchot – is a secondary educational institution founded in Saint-Louis (Senegal) in 1916. It is named in honor of General François Blanchot de Verly (1735–1807), who was a governor of Senegal. It is one of the pioneering institutions of the colonial era and, like Lycée Faidherbe, was a breeding ground for leaders in French West Africa (AOF). Many students, after completing their education, joined the William Ponty Normal School to become teachers. Numerous notable figures in Senegal's political, religious, and cultural scenes, such as Mady Cissokho, Cheikh Hamidou Kane, Mamadou Dia, Madior Cissé, Médoune Fall, Ousmane Socé Diop, Assane Seck, Diaraf Diouf, and Ibrahima Diallo, are alumni.

== History ==
In Saint-Louis, the institution succeeded the School for Sons of Chiefs and Interpreters, which itself was derived from the École des otages founded by Louis Faidherbe in 1855.

The school opened in Saint-Louis in 1916. It included several sections. Besides the standard curriculum aimed at future teaching monitors, other courses were designed to train public writers, typists, accountants, postal and telegraph employees, nurses, and manual and agricultural workers.

In 1931, École Blanchot had 180 students.

In 1952, EPS Blanchot was renamed Collège Blanchot.

In 1963, its premises were taken over by Lycée Ameth Fall.

== See also ==
=== Bibliography ===
- Denise Bouche, L'enseignement dans les territoires français de l'Afrique occidentale de 1817 à 1920 : mission civilisatrice ou formation d'une élite ?, Université Paris 1, 1974, 2 vol., 947 p. (doctoral thesis in Literature)
- Jean Capelle, L'éducation en Afrique noire à la veille des Indépendances, 1946-1958, Karthala, Paris, 1990, 326 p. ISBN 2-86537-240-5
- Boubacar Ly, Les instituteurs au Sénégal de 1903 à 1945, vol. III, La formation au métier d'instituteur, L'Harmattan, Paris, 2009, chapter XIII, p. 61-439 ISBN 9782296094154

=== Related articles ===
- Education in Senegal
