= Thiès massacre =

1938 massacre in French West Africa

- Part of the Great Depression in France
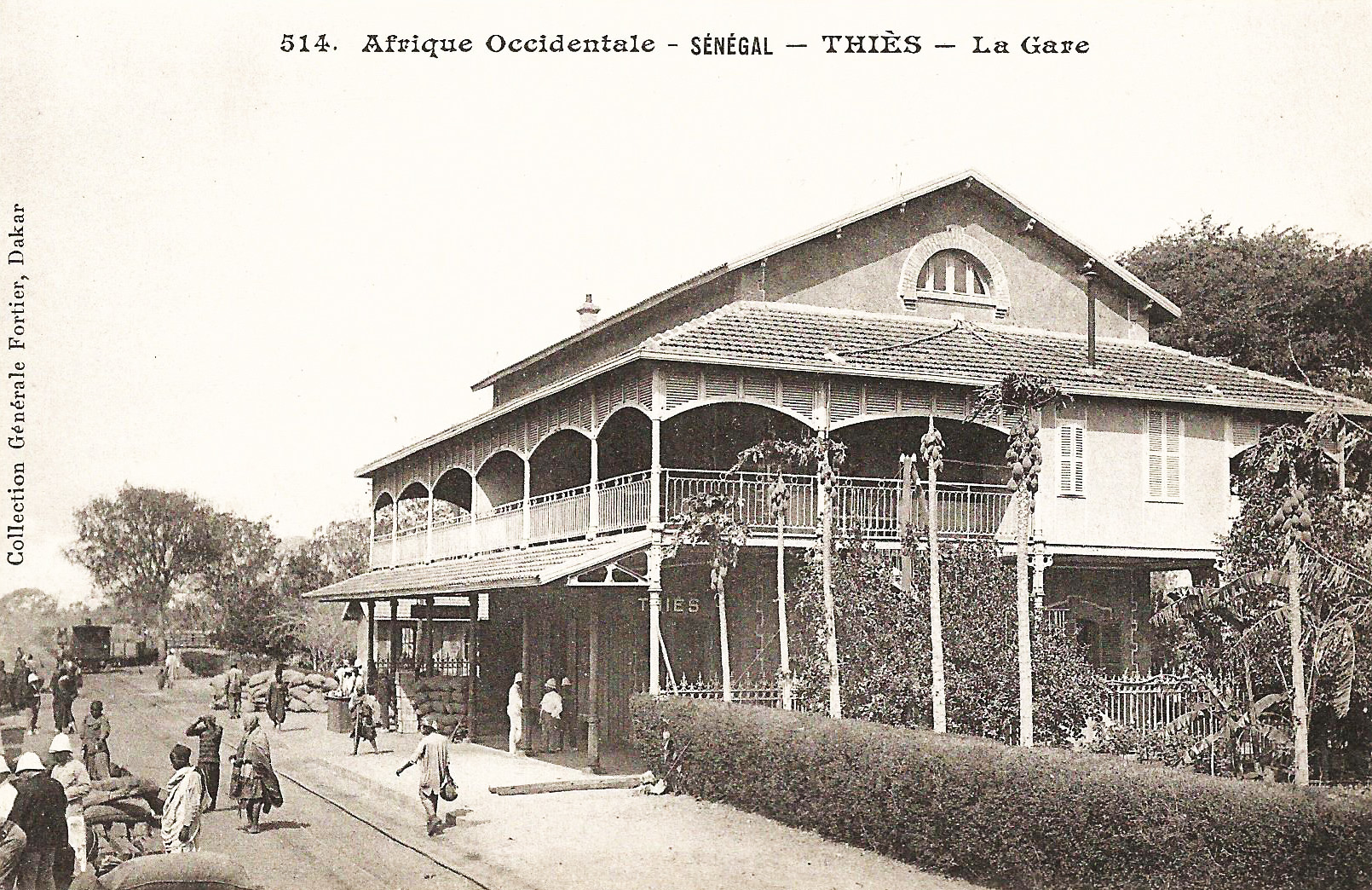
- Thiès station, Senegal (c. early 20th century)
- Location: Thiès, French West Africa (now part of Senegal)
- Date: 27 September 1938
- Deaths: 6
- Injuries: ~92
- Victim: Striking railway workers
- Perpetrators: French Army, colonial police
- Motive: Repression of the strike

The Thiès massacre (French: Massacre de Thiès) occurred on 27 September 1938 in the city of Thiès, Senegal (at the time part of French West Africa) when the French Army and colonial police fired on striking workers from the Dakar–Niger Railway, killing 6 people and injuring around 92 more.

== Background ==
Since the establishment of the Dakar–Saint-Louis railway in 1885, rail transport had become an important part of the economy for the city of Thiès. This became even more prominent after the Dakar–Niger Railway (DN) installed offices and repair shops there. Other minor branches leave Thiès and reinforce its importance in the logistics of the colony. The DN employed 8,617 people in 1943, of whom 7,500 were not covered by the status of "railway worker", instead being hired as auxiliary workers or day labourers.

Trade unionism within the Senegalese railway was organized on a racial basis, with a European workers' union (the AOF Railway Workers' Union) and another for African workers. Among African workers, however, there were also divisions, between those who enjoyed the status of railway workers, and auxiliaries and day labourers. The syndicat des travailleurs indigènes du Dakar-Niger (STIDN), led by François Gning, mainly brought together the incumbents, while a competing union was created by the auxiliaries. Each union was supported by a political figure, with Amadou Lamine-Guèye on the side of STIDN, and the deputy Ngalandou Diouf on the side of the syndicate of auxiliaries, the Association amicale professionnelle des Agents du Dakar-Niger.

=== Great Depression and crisis in Europe ===
The Great Depression caused a significant amount of inflation and made the cost of living more expensive, which became one of the main motivations of strikers. At the time of the strike, Europe was in the midst of the Sudeten crisis: on 26 September 1938, the leader of Nazi Germany, Adolf Hitler, delivered his ultimatum speech at the Berlin Sportpalast, and France's general mobilisation plan was ready; in French West Africa, it was strongly based on the railways, including that of the Dakar–Niger.

== Social movements in the summer of 1938 ==
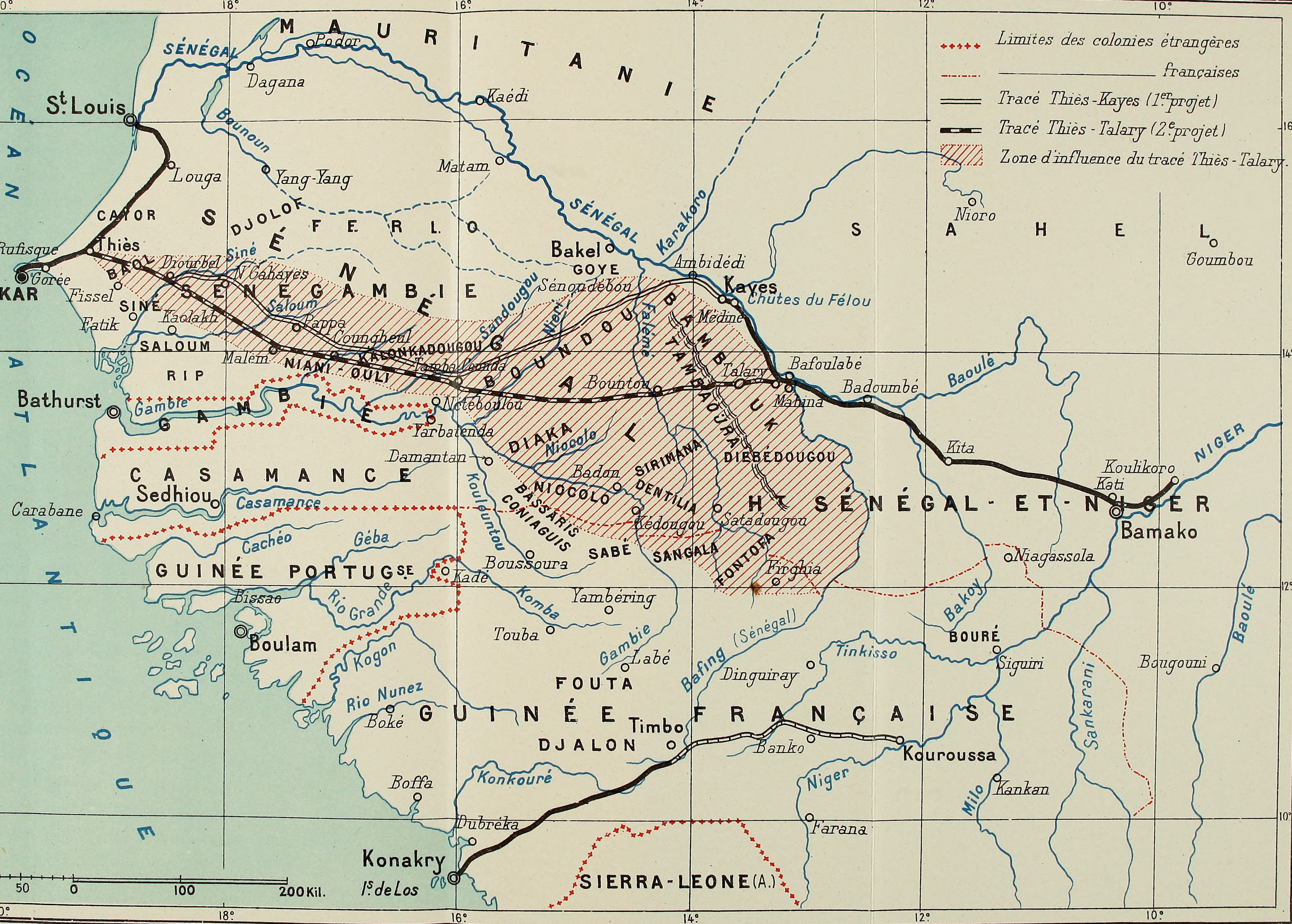
Map of the Dakar–Niger Railway, 1908

The auxiliaries did not benefit from the advantages of the incumbents,having lower wages and being without job security. In addition, since Girand's arrival in the DN leadership, many Dahomeans had been recruited, and the DN also recruited many workers trained at the École primaire supérieure Blanchot and the école professionnelle Pinet-Laprade, limiting the possibilities of professional ascent for many workers.

Because of this, The auxiliaries (led by the STIDN) sought to get a salary increase of 1.5 francs for employees with between 5 and 10 years of seniority, 3.5 francs for older employees, and travel allowances. They also wanted (among other things), the introduction of a commuter train from Dakar to Rufisque for railway workers.

On 20 June 1938, during a visit by the director to the workshops, a gathering took place. The agreement was reached on the wage increase, while negotiations on the other measures postponed until 9 August. However, on 11 August, STIDN denounced these negotiations that were taking place outside its presence. The negotiations failed, sabotaged by this denouncement, and (at the request of the governor-general of French West Africa) the decision was made to transfer Cheick Diack, leader of the auxiliaries, and to move him to another position in Gossas, which occurred on 26 September. The auxiliaries mobilize against this transfer by requesting a hearing (which was rejected) and by a petition signed by 806 of them. As a result, the auxiliaries started to strike.

== Massacre ==
Modern day picture of a level crossing in Thiès

On 27 September, the level crossing leading to the railway offices was guarded by 45 municipal and DN police officers, 5 cercle guards and 6 gendarmes, all Senegalese except 3 European gendarmes. The strikers, initially numbering at about 100, and armed with clubs, iron bars, hammers and other weapons, headed towards the crossing. Their aim was to stop the work of the non-strikers. The security forces moved to disperse the rally, but the strikers immediately defended themselves, wounding 5 of the police.

Two sections of the French West Africa infantry battalion were then called in as reinforcements, while other strikers joined the original group, bringing the crowd size to about 300. Security forces made orders to disperse, in both French and Wolof, but the strikers demanded the return of Cheick Diack. A second time, security pushed back the strikers, who return a few minutes later, more numerous, while a section of Senegalese Tirailleurs arrives as additional reinforcement.

The troops then charged towards the strikers, who defended themselves, with fighting being carried out with sharp objects and sticks. During the fight, the soldiers fired their weapons, which angered the strikers, who were now reinforced by the women of the city. The many dead and injured triggered a strengthening of the strike: the trains still in circulation were left immobilized. In a panic, officials were sent to ask Diack to resume traffic on the network. In a position of strength, he requested a meeting of all trade union delegates in Thiès to prepare for the negotiation. Diack met Governor Marcel de Coppet and Commander Cau at the cercle house: salary increases were granted and administrative sanctions lifted. Diack therefore orders the strike to be lifted.

== Aftermath ==
As a result of the military and police response, 6 of the strikers were killed. Many more were left injured: 12 were seriously injured (including 5 in the security forces), and 80 with minor injuries, 35 of them among the strikers. In addition, 27 strikers did not come seeking medical treatment until 30 September. The wounded were taken to the DN infirmary and then evacuated to the Hôpital Le Dantec in Dakar. The right-wing press condemned the governor Marcel de Coppet, who was appointed by the left-wing Popular Front, and campaigned for his recall.

The French government justified the repression of the strike by the threat it posed to a possible general mobilisation in the event of war. The colonial minister, Georges Mandel, sent Gaston Joseph to investigate the massacre. Governor Marcel de Coppet was recalled, alongside Albert Giran (Director of the DN), Maurice Lescanne (Deputy Director of the DN) and Pierre Cau (Deputy Administrator of Thiès). Meanwhile, those in charge of the military and law enforcement (Paolici, police commissioner of Thiès; Lagunegrand, commander of arms; and Rafeuil, second lieutenant, commander of the platoon of gunmen) were not punished.

The 1938 Dakar–Niger railway strike has been described as the first major strike in the French colonies of Africa.

== See also ==
- 1940s Senegalese general strikes
- Thiaroye massacre, another massacre in Senegal in 1944

== Bibliography ==
- Bangali, N’goran Gédéon (2021). "François Gning and the "yellow movement" in the two strikes of African railwaymen in Thiès (1938-1947)" [François Gning et le "mouvement jaune" dans les deux grèves des cheminots africains à Thiès (1938-1947)]. Revue gabonaise d’histoire et d’archéologie (in French). 2 (2): 33–56.
- Bernard-Duquenet, Nicole (1985). "La grève de Thiès et ses répercussions au Sénégal -- septembre 1938" [Thiès strike and its repercussions in Senegal -- September 1938]. Le Sénégal et le Front Populaire [Senegal and the Popular Front] (in French). L'Harmattan. pp. 182–218.
- Diop, Babacar Mbaye (2023). "17. Les martyrs de Thiès : la grève des cheminots du 27 septembre 1938" [The martyrs of Thiès: the railway strike of 27 September 1938]. La vocation de servir [The vocation to serve] (in French). Éditions Hermann. pp. 115–118. Archived from the original on 1 January 2026.
- Lescanne, Pierre (2021). La grève du Dakar-Niger (août-décembre 1938) : ma visite aux Archives nationales de l'Outre-Mer et ailleurs [The strike of the Dakar-Niger (August-December 1938): my visit to the National Archives of the Overseas and elsewhere] (in French). Vol. 1. SUDOC 255336047.
- Mbengue, Mamadou Seyni (April 1975). "The tragic strike of the Thiès railwaymen" [La grève tragique des cheminots de Thiès]. Éthiopiques, revue négro-africaine de littérature et de philosophie (in French) (2). Archived from the original on 15 October 2018.
