= Madieng Khary Dieng =

Senegalese politician (1932–2020)

Minister of the Interior
- In office April 1991 – May 1993
- Preceded by: Famara Ibrahima Sagna
- Succeeded by: Djibo Leyti Kâ

Minister of the Armed Forces
- In office June 1993 – March 1995
- Preceded by: Médoune Fall
- Succeeded by: Cheikh Hamidou Kane Mathiara

Ambassador to Gambia
- In office 1996–1998
- Preceded by: Moctar Kébé
- Succeeded by: Mamadou Diop

Personal details
- Born: November 21, 1932 Coki, Senegal
- Died: 27 November 2020 (aged 88) Rabat, Morocco
- Party: Socialist Party
- Profession: Civil administrator

Madieng Khary Dieng (21 November 1932 – 27 November 2020) was a Senegalese politician, who was a member of the Socialist Party. He served as a government minister several times during Abdou Diouf's presidency.

== Biography ==
Madieng Khary Dieng was born in Coki on 21 November 1932. He continued his studies in Paris where he was auditor at the Institute of Higher Studies from 1964 to 1966 and at Dakar, at the National School of Administration.

On 8 April 1991 he was appointed Minister of the Interior. In his memoirs, Prime Minister Habib Thiam described him as an "excellent interior minister". Both have had to face a particularly tense situation at the time of the election of 9 May 1993 and assassination of Vice President of the Constitutional Council Babacar Sèye, a few days later, on 15 May 1993.

Madieng Khary Dieng became Armed Forces Minister in the second government of Habib Thiam formed in June 1993. On 8 July 1993, in Ziguinchor, he signed an important cease-fire agreement with Augustin Diamacoune Senghor, Secretary General of the MFDC. On 15 March 1995, Cheikh Hamidou Kane Mathiara succeeded him to the Ministry of Armed Forces.

After leaving the government, Madieng Khary Dieng was appointed Ambassador to Gambia, a position he held from 1996 to 1998. General Mamadou Diop succeeded him.

A neighborhood in the city of Guédiawaye was named in his honor.

Dieng died on 27 November 2020.

== Bibliography ==
- Babacar Ndiaye and Waly Ndiaye, Présidents et ministres de la République du Sénégal, Dakar, 2006 (2nd ed.), p. 147
