= Mamadou Niang (military officer) =

Senegalese politician (1938–2020)

Interior Minister
- In office 2000–2002

Personal details
- Born: 1938 Podor, Senegal
- Died: 28 December 2020 (aged 81–82)

Mamadou Niang (1938 – 28 December 2020) was a Senegalese military officer who served as Minister of the Interior of the Republic of Senegal.

== Career ==
In 2001, he did not allow a planned LGBTQ demonstration in Dakar to take place.

== Death ==
Niang died in 2020.
