= Eugene F. Reid =

American scouting official

Chairman of the World Scout Committee
- In office 1990–1993
- Succeeded by: Neil M. Westaway

Eugene F. "Bud" Reid (28 September 1926 – 2 October 2005) was a notable official of the Boy Scouts of America and Chairman of the World Scout Committee.

After serving in the US Navy during World War II, he worked in the oil and gas sectors as a geologist.

== Background ==
He was the president of the World Jamboree Committee from 1978-1979, traveling to Australia, Egypt, Ireland, Senegal and Thailand. He then chaired the World Scout Committee from 1990 to 1993, meeting with Pope John Paul II during that time.

Reid was awarded the Bronze Wolf, the only distinction of the World Organization of the Scout Movement, awarded by the World Scout Committee for exceptional services to world Scouting. He was also a recipient of the Silver Buffalo Award in 1988.

World Organization of the Scout Movement
Preceded by	Chairman of the World Scout Committee; 1990–1993	Succeeded by Neil M. Westaway
