= Ministry of Armed Forces (Senegal) =

Government agency in Senegal

- Ministère des Forces Armées

Agency overview
- Jurisdiction: Government of Senegal
- Headquarters: MH78+56G, Dakar, Senegal
- Minister responsible: Sidiki Kaba, Minister of the Armed Forces
- Key document: Decree 2012-636
- Website: https://www.forcesarmees.gouv.sn/contact

The Ministry of Armed Forces (French: Ministère des Forces Armées), is the government agency responsible for overseeing the national defense and security of the Republic of Senegal. It is one of the key ministries in the Senegalese government and plays a crucial role in the management of the Senegalese Armed Forces.

== Overview and responsibilities ==
The Ministry of Armed Forces is tasked with the formulation and implementation of defense policies, as well as the coordination and management of the armed forces of Senegal. The Ministry of Defence has several core responsibilities, including: National Security, Defence Planning and Policy, Armed Forces Management, engaging in regional and international defense initiatives, and Civil-Military Relations.

== Minister of Defence ==
The Minister of Defence is the political head of the Ministry of Armed Forces. They are appointed by the President of Senegal and are responsible for providing strategic direction and leadership to the ministry. The minister oversees the implementation of defense policies, represents the ministry at national and international forums, and acts as the primary point of contact for matters related to defense.

=== Past titles ===
- Minister of the Interior, temporarily in charge of Defense (Ministre de l'Intérieur, temporairement chargé de la Défense).
- President of the council, Minister of National Defense (Président du conseil, ministre de la Défense nationale).
- Minister of Armed Forces (Ministre des Forces armées).
- Minister of State, Minister of Armed Forces (Ministre d'État, ministre des Forces armées).

== See also ==
- Government of Senegal
- List of ministers of the armed forces (Senegal)
- Senegalese Armed Forces
