= Cheikh Hamidou Kane Mathiara =

Senegalese politician and economist (1939–2009)

Minister of the Armed Forces
- In office 15 March 1995 – 2000
- Prime Minister: Habib Thiam; Mamadou Lamine Loum
- Preceded by: Madieng Khary Dieng
- Succeeded by: Youba Sambou

Member of the National Assembly of Senegal
- In office 2001–2007

Personal details
- Born: 18 December 1939 Dagana
- Died: 15 May 2009 (aged 69) Dakar
- Resting place: Yoff
- Citizenship: Senegal
- Party: Socialist Party; Alliance of the Forces of Progress
- Profession: economist

Cheikh Hamidou Kane, nicknamed "Mathaira," (18 December 1939 - 15 May 2009) was a Senegalese politician and economist who served as a government minister several times during Abdou Diouf's presidency. He was a member of the Socialist Party (PS) and later of the Alliance of the Forces of Progress (AFP).

== Biography ==
Of Futa origin, Cheikh Hamidou Kane initially undertook studies at Matam, where his father was Chief Financial Officer and paymaster for the cercle of Matam. In 1945, Kane began his Qur'anic studies which he completed with success six years later in 1951. It was as a result of these studies that he received the nickname Mathiara talibe Almoudo. In the same year he enrolled at the École normale supérieure William Ponty, from which he was expelled in 1959 as a result of a strike. He studied on his own for the baccalaureat and then enrolled at the Cheikh Anta Diop University and then in the economic and financial department of the École nationale d'administration, from which he received his diploma in 1967. He then travelled to France for the first time, visiting the Ministry of Economy and Finance and the prefecture of Poitiers before returning to Senegal.

In Senegal he held several high government positions in succession, mainly in the Ministry of Economy and Finance. In 1981, he was named Director of Debt and Investments in the Ministry of Economy and Finance, then Director of Economic Control and Director of Internal Trade, and finally Director of External Trade. Subsequently, from 1984 to 1990, he was Director of the Senegalese Company of Insurance and Re-Insurance (CSAR), which would become AXA Insurance.

In March 1990, he was named Ministerial Delegate at the Presidency for African Economic Integration. Further ministerial responsibilities were then conferred on him: he was Ministerial Delegate for Rural Development and Water from April 1991 to June 1993, then Minister of Commerce and Industry from June 1993 to March 1995. On 15 March 1995, he was appointed Minister of the Armed Forces in Habib Thiam's third cabinet. He retained this position in Mamadou Lamine Loum's cabinet. He lost his ministerial role in 2000, after Abdoulaye Wade and the Senegalese Democratic Party (PDS) came to power.

Long a member of the Socialist Party, he joined the Alliance of the Forces of Progress (AFP) of Moustapha Niasse (whom he had known in university) and was made part of the AFP's political bureau and regional co-ordinator for Matam.

Between 2001 and 2007 he was an AFP deputy in the National Assembly.

He was involved in the campaigns for the local elections in 2009, but after several months of illness he travelled to France to receive treatment and then returned to Senegal. He died in Dakar on 15 May 2009 and was buried in the Muslim cemetery at Yoff.

== Bibliography ==
- Babacar Ndiaye et Waly Ndiaye, Présidents et ministres de la République du Sénégal, 2000, p. 208.
