= Neil M. Westaway =

Neil M. Westaway AO

Chairman of the World Organization of the Scout Movement committee
- In office 1993–1996
- Preceded by: Eugene F. Reid
- Succeeded by: Abdourahmane Sow

Neil M. Westaway, AO of Victoria, Australia was The Scout Association of Australia's chief commissioner, as well as the chairman of the World Organization of the Scout Movement (WOSM) committee and chairman of its Scout Resources International (SCORE) board, replacing Kun-Bae Park.

Westaway began his career as a Cub Scout in Australia. As an adult leader, he became the Victoria state commissioner, the 16th World Scout Jamboree camp chief, and is currently a member of the World Scout Foundation.

In October 1999, WOSM awarded Westaway its 281st Bronze Wolf Award for exceptional services to world Scouting.

Westaway worked for the Deloitte consulting firm.

Westaway was appointed an Officer of the Order of Australia (AO) in the 2019 Queen's birthday honours for "distinguished service to youth through Scouts at the national and international level, and to the community of Victoria".

World Organization of the Scout Movement
Preceded by Eugene F. Reid	Chairman of the World Scout Committee; 1993–1996	Succeeded by Abdourahmane Sow
