= Mlomp, Bignona =

Mlomp
- Village
- Location in Senegal
- Coordinates: 12.8289°N 16.5275°W
- Country: Senegal
- Region: Ziguinchor
- Department: Bignona
- Arrondissement: Tendouck
- Elevation: 11 m (36 ft)

Population (2002)
  - Total: 2,746

Mlomp is a village in Lower Casamance, Senegal, located to the north of Thionck Essyl and to the south of Kartiack. At the time of the 2002 census, the locality contained 2,746 in 382 households. It is the main settlement of the rural community of Mlomp (Bignona), in Bignona Department of the Ziguinchor Region.

== History ==
List of chiefs of Mlomp:

- Landiany Sambou (1882–1903)
- Abdou Niamby Sambou (1903–1929)
- Idrissa Horro Sambou (1929–1945)
- Lalo Diatta (1945–1952)
- Mamadou Sambou (1952–1995)
- Idrissa Sambou (1995–2011)
- Mamadou diatta (2011–present)

== Administration ==
Village chief : Mamadou diatta (elected 29 October 2011)

Heads of the quarters : Lamine Coly (Boundia), who died 31 May 2015 at Ziguinchor; Sahissa Mané Sambou (Etamaya); Yaya Sambou (Balokir); Abba Diédhiou (Kawaguir)

Mlomp consists of four quarters which contain 11 sub-quarters.

- Boundia Quarter. Sub-quarters : Boussoya, Djifalone, Manana.
- Balokir Quarter. Sub-quarters : Balokir, Dialome, Kagogoune.
- Etamaya Quarter. Sub-quarters : Koubananck, Kagnédième, Boffé, Bakobote
- Kawaguir Quarter. Sub-quarters : Bondine, Dialome.

== People from Mlomp ==
- Youba Sambou, Senegalese Minister of Armed Forces (2000–2002)
