= Lamine Cissé (disambiguation) =

Lamine Cissé may refer to:

== People ==
- Mohammed Lamine Cissé, A French Professional Footballer on the Ligue 2 team Nancy
- Lamine Moise Cissé A Senegalese Professional Footballer
- Lamine Cissé (General) (1939–2019) General of the Army, and Minister of the Interior of Senegal
