= Youba Sambou =

Senegalese politician

Minister of the Armed Forces of Senegal
- In office 3 April 2000 – 1 October 2002
- Prime Minister: Moustapha Niasse; Mame Madior Boye
- Preceded by: Cheikh Hamidou Kane Mathiara
- Succeeded by: Bécaye Diop

Member of the National Assembly of Senegal
- In office 2007–2012

Mayor of Bignona

Personal details
- Born: 1944 (age 81–82) Mlomp, Casamance
- Citizenship: Senegal
- Party: Senegalese Democratic Party (PDS)
- Profession: teacher, headmaster

Youba Sambou (born 1944) is a Senegalese politician from Casamance who served in the government of Senegal as Minister of the Armed Forces from 2000 to 2002. He also served as Mayor of Bignona and was elected as a member of the National Assembly in 2007.

== Biography ==
Youba Sambou is of Jola descent and was born in Mlomp in Bignona Department in 1944. During the 1960s and 70s, he taught mathematics and physics at several lycées, before being appointed as a headmaster, initially in Diourbel and eventually (after a short administrative interlude in Paris) in Bignona in the 1990s.

Alongside his teaching duties, he took an active role in the Senegalese Democratic Party (PDS).

When PDS came to power in 2000, Sambou was named Minister of the Armed Forces in the cabinet of Moustapha Niasse, replacing Cheikh Hamidou Kane Mathiara of the Socialist Party. He was confirmed in his role on 12 May 2001. The sinking of the MV Le Joola with more than 1800 victims took place during his tenure and he had to resign on 1 October 2002, along with Prime Minister Mame Madior Boye. He was succeeded by Bécaye Diop.

Following a court action undertaken in 2003 by 22 families who had lost relatives in the tragedy, an international arrest warrant was issued on 12 September 2008 by a judge in Évry (Essonne) for Mame Madior Boye, Youba Sabou and seven other people, but the warrants for the two former ministers were annulled on 16 June 2009 by the Chambre de l'instruction of the Court of Appeal of Paris, on account of the roles that they held at the time of the disaster.

Youba Sambou was elected as a member of the National Assembly in the 2007 parliamentary election. He was also Mayor of Bignona until 2009. Mamadou Lamine Keita succeeded him in this position.

== See also ==
- Armed Forces of Senegal
- Politics of Senegal

== Bibliography ==
- Babacar Ndiaye & Waly Ndiaye, Présidents et ministres de la République du Sénégal, Dakar, 2006 (2nd edition), p. 355
