= École nationale d'administration (Senegal) =

Senegalese public institution

National School of Administration
- École nationale d'administration
- Type: Public institution
- Established: 1960
- Director: Mouhamadou Lamine Diallo
- Academic staff: 80–130
- Administrative staff: 28
- Location: Dakar, Senegal
- Language: French
- Website: ena.sn

The National School of Administration (ENA) of Senegal is a higher education institution located in Dakar, directly attached to the Office of the Prime Minister (Prime Minister).

== History ==
The National School of Administration of Senegal has a long history. Its origins are rooted in the colonial history of Senegal, France, and French West Africa (AOF). It was named the National School of Administration and Magistracy (ENAM) from 1975 to 1995.

== Organization ==
The entrance exam to this school is known for being very selective. In 2011, nearly 18,000 candidates (all cycles and sections combined) applied for 147 open positions.

== Notable alumni ==
- Mamadou Lamine Loum, politician, Prime Minister under Abdou Diouf from 1998 to 2000
- Ousmane Tanor Dieng, politician, Secretary-General of the Socialist Party
- Amadou Ba, politician, Prime Minister under Macky Sall
- Mame Mandiaye Niang, deputy Prosecutor of the International Criminal Court

== See also ==
- Education in Senegal
- École nationale de la France d'outre-mer

== Bibliography ==
- École nationale d'Administration, Rufisque, Impr. nationale, 1967, 37 p. (presentation booklet)
- « The Senegal National School of Administration (SNSA) », Cahiers africains d'Administration publique (Tangier), no. 1, May 1967, p. 11–29
