= Ibrahima Diallo (politician) =

Senegalese politician (born 1915)

Ibrahima Diallo (born 1915 in Sedhiou, Senegal) was a Senegalese politician who served in the French Senate from 1956 to 1958.
