= Mbaye Ndiaye (politician) =

Senegalese politician

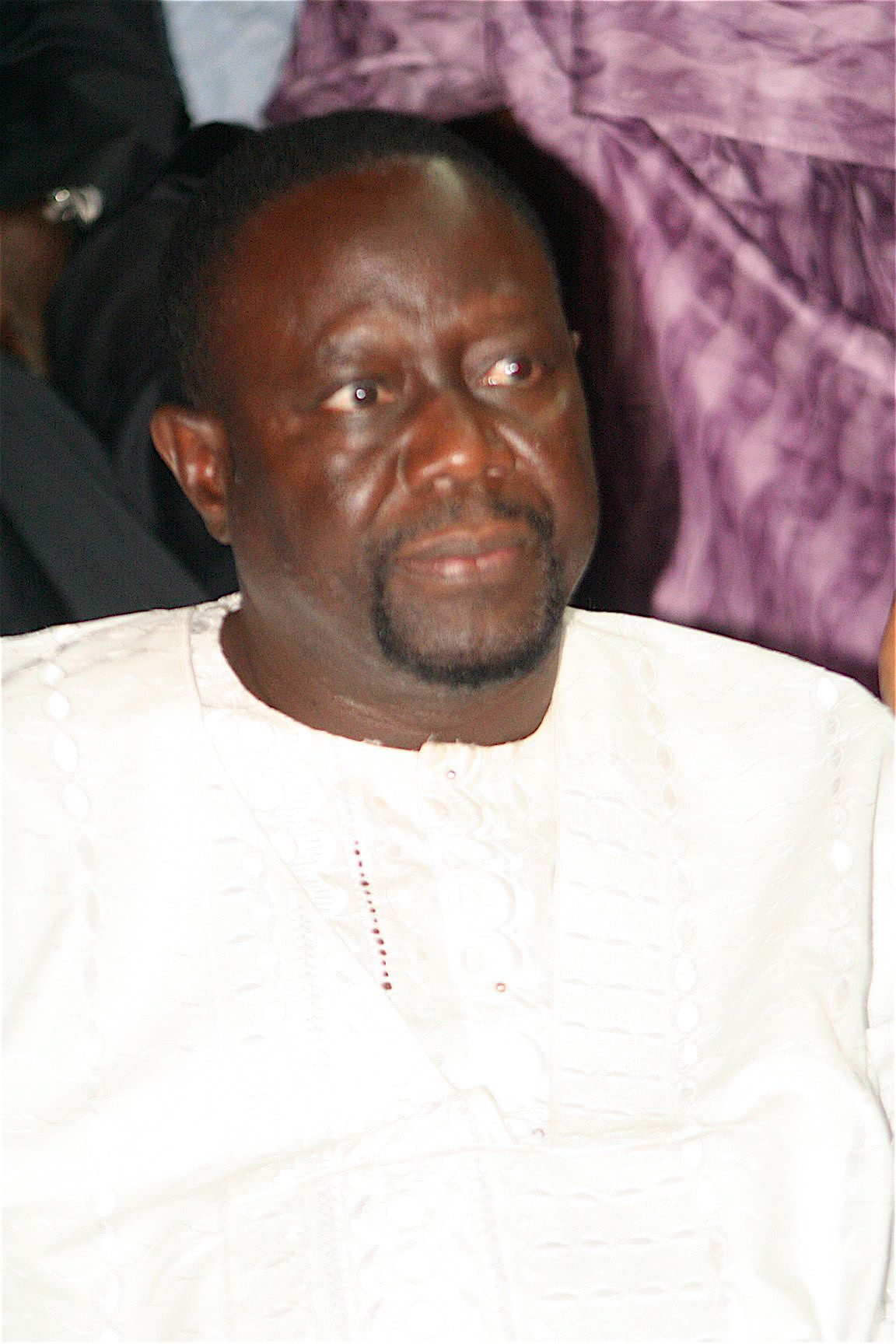
Mbaye Ndiaye in 2008

Mbaye Ndiaye is a Senegalese politician who was Minister of the Interior from 4 April 2012 to 29 October 2012, then Minister of State without Portfolio.

An old employee of Senelec and member of the Senegalese Democratic Party (PDS), Ndiaye became Mayor of the Parcelles Assainies district of Dakar in 2001. He opposed the expulsion of Macky Sall from the National Assembly by his own party and he left the party in 2008, losing his seat and perks as a result, in order to establish the Alliance for the Republic (APR) with Sall, becoming the new party's director of structures. Abdoulaye Wade removed him from his position as mayor on 29 October 2008 by presidential decree.

Ndiaye worked to build support for the APR in the country, particularly in Dakar.

An expert in the Senegalese electoral system and skilled strategist, Ndiaye was named Minister of the Interior after the victory of Macky Sall in the February–March 2012 presidential election, replacing Ousmane Ngom in April 2012. He took a series of risky positions and responded poorly to the protest of the Thiantacounes on 22 October 2012, leading to the loss of his office in a government reshuffle on 29 October. On the next day, he was named Minister of State without Portfolio under the President.
