= André Sonko =

Senegalese politician

Andre Sonko (born 4 February 1944 in Ngazobil) is a politician in Senegal.

Sonko was the Senegalese Minister for Education, and presided over the 1998 UNESCO World Conference for Higher Education.
