= Moustapha Sourang =

Senegalese politician (1949–2020)

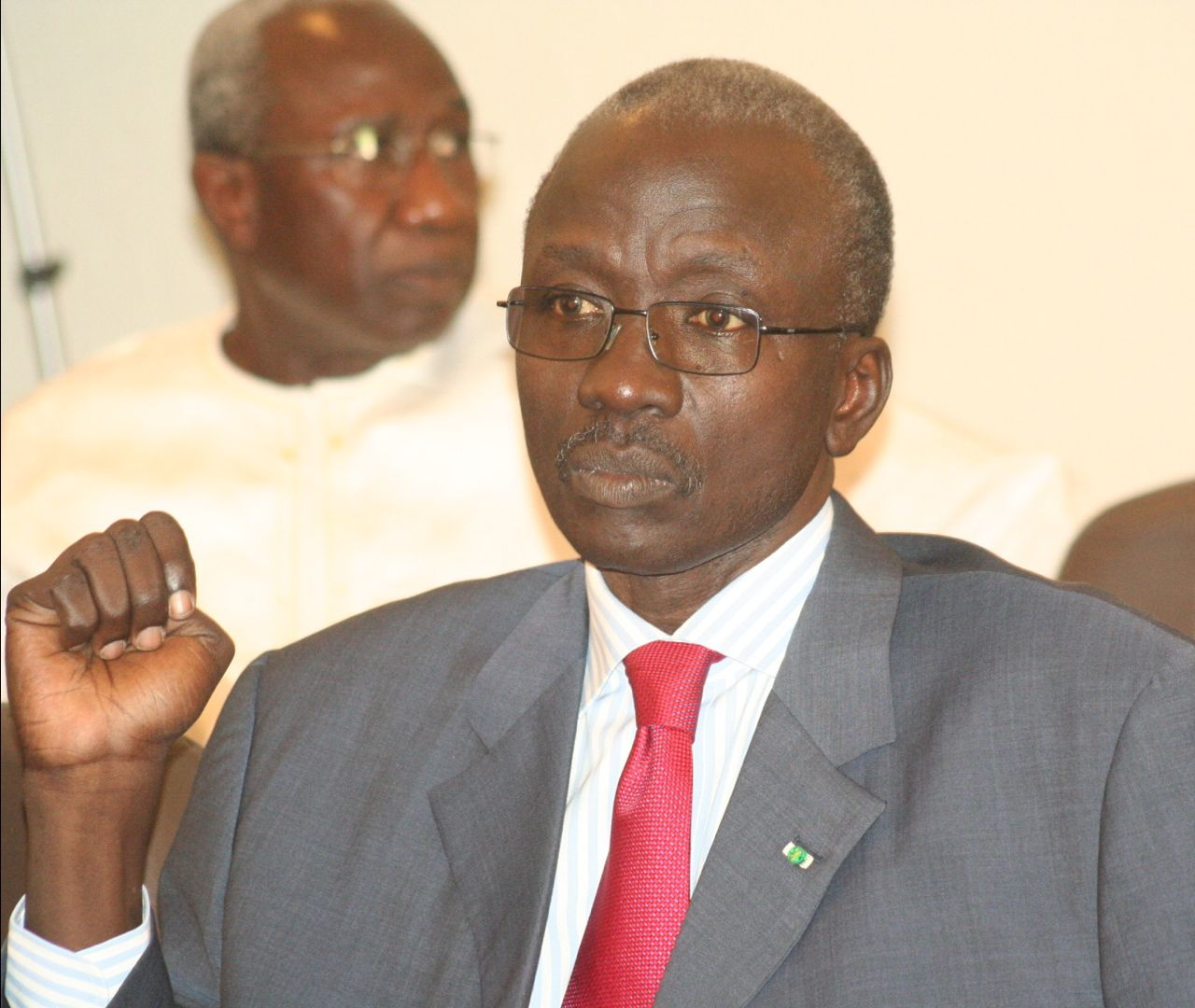

Minister of the Senegalese Armed Forces
- In office 4 December 2011 – 3 April 2012
- Preceded by: Bécaye Diop
- Succeeded by: Augustin Tine

Personal details
- Born: 24 July 1949 Saint-Louis, French West Africa
- Died: 4 August 2020 (aged 71) Dakar

Moustapha Sourang (24 July 1949 – 4 August 2020) was a Senegalese politician.

== Biography ==
Sourang was born on 24 July 1949 in Saint-Louis in the French West Africa colony. He was a direct descendant of Amadou Bamba, founder of the Mouride brotherhood. He was the son of Massourang Sourang, a nobleman during the 1920s.

Sourang earned a master's degree in public law from Cheikh Anta Diop University in Dakar in 1974. He then studied at the University of Bordeaux in France, earning a doctorate in public law in 1975, a doctorate in political science in 1976, and another degree in public law in 1980 with a thesis titled La technique contractuelle dans les rapports États-entreprises étrangères : contribution à l'étude des conventions d'établissement conclues par les États africains.

Sourang taught at Cheikh Anta Diop University, becoming Dean of the Faculty of Legal Sciences in 1984 and serving until 1998. In May 2001, he was appointed by Abdoulaye Wade as Minister of Education, a position he held until 1 October 2009, when he was appointed Minister of Justice and Keeper of the Seals. On 4 December 2011, he was appointed by Wade as Minister of the Armed Forces, a position he held until 3 April 2012

Sourang held a number of honors throughout his career. He was a Commander of the Ordre national du Mérite du Sénégal, a Commander of the Ordre national du Mérite of France, an Officer of the Ordre des Palmes académiques, and an Officer of the Ordre national du Mérite of Burkina Faso.
