= Ousmane Ngom =

Senegalese politician

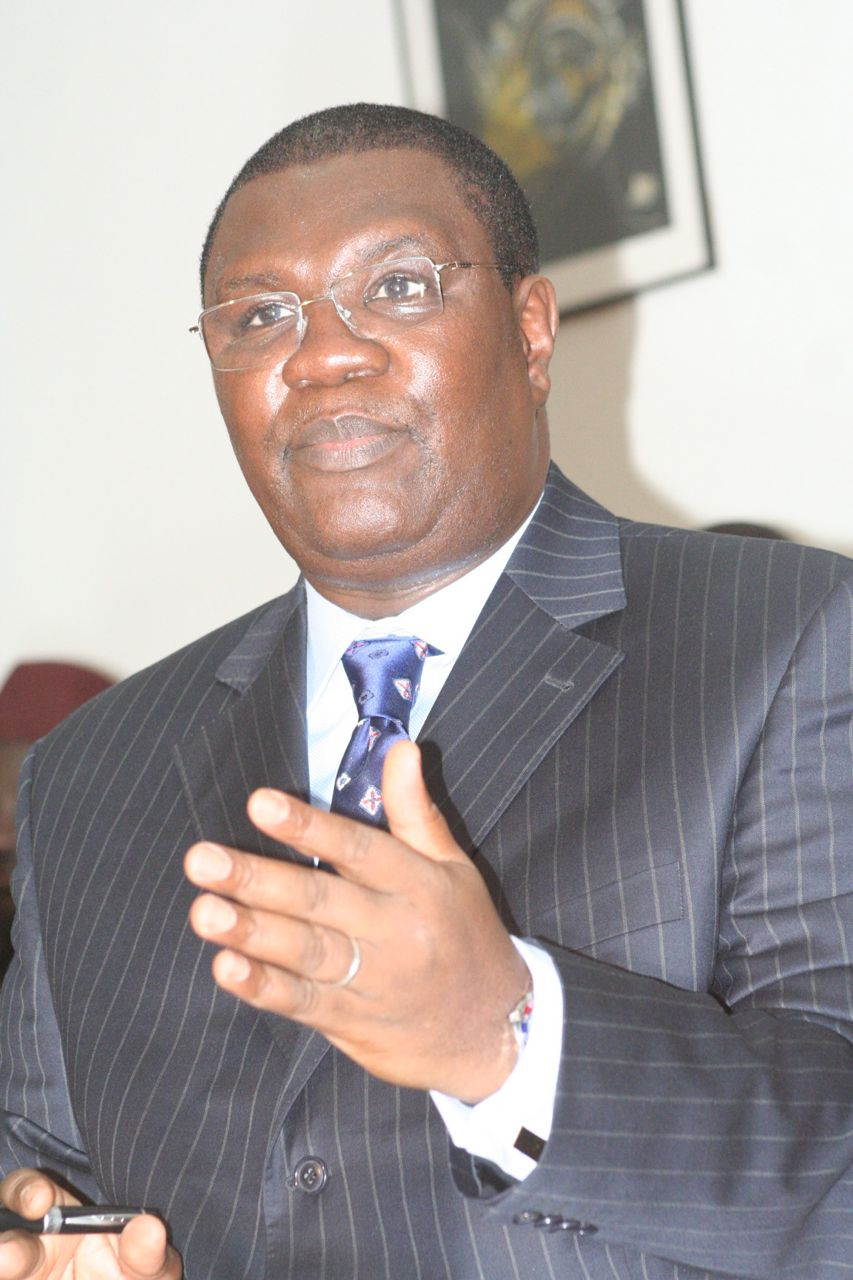
Ngom in 2008

Ousmane Alioune Ngom (born 18 May 1955) is a Senegalese politician. As a leading member of the Senegalese Democratic Party (PDS), Ngom served as a minister in national unity governments from 1991 to 1992 and from 1995 to 1998. He split from the PDS to form his own party in 1998, but returned to the PDS in 2003. Under President Abdoulaye Wade, Ngom was a presidential adviser from 2003 to 2004, and from 2004 to 2012 he again served as a minister in the government, ultimately as Minister of State for the Interior from September 2010 to April 2012. Since 2012, he has served as a Deputy in the National Assembly of Senegal.

== Political career ==
Ngom, a lawyer by profession, was born in Saint-Louis, Senegal. He held a variety of positions within the Senegalese Democratic Party (PDS) from 1975 to 1998, while it was in opposition, and for a time he was the party's second ranking figure, after Secretary-General Abdoulaye Wade. Over the years he served as the party's National Secretary for Press and Information, as Wade's spokesman for over 15 years, as National Secretary for Foreign Relations, and as Deputy Secretary-General. He was a member of the National Assembly and President of the Liberal Parliamentary Group from May 1988 to March 1991. When the PDS participated in the government from April 1991 to October 1992, Ngom served as Minister of Labor and Professional Training. From 1993 to 1995 he was again a member of the National Assembly and President of the Liberal Parliamentary Group.

Following the assassination of Constitutional Council Vice-President Babacar Sèye in May 1993, Ngom was brought in for questioning along with Wade on May 18. He and Wade were among those charged with complicity in the murder on October 1, 1993, but he was not held in custody or put on trial, enjoying parliamentary immunity.

When the PDS joined the government for a second time, Ngom became Minister of Health and Social Action and served in that position from March 1995 to March 1998. The PDS leadership was rearranged on June 5, 1998, and Ngom lost his position as deputy leader of the party; he was named Permanent Secretary instead. He promptly resigned from the PDS on June 11 and announced the creation of a new party, the Senegalese Liberal Party (PLS), on June 18.

Wade was elected as President in 2000. Ngom was elected to the National Assembly in the April 2001 parliamentary election, winning his seat through national list proportional representation; he was the only PLS candidate to win a seat. He was also elected to the Municipal Council of Saint-Louis and the Regional Council of Saint-Louis in May 2002. The PLS merged with the PDS in May 2003, and Ngom was appointed as Presidential Adviser for International Relations, with the rank of Minister, on August 14, 2003. He was then appointed to the government as Minister of Trade on July 19, 2004, before being moved to the position of Minister of the Interior in the government named on November 2, 2004.

In the government of Prime Minister Cheikh Hadjibou Soumaré, named on June 19, 2007, Ousmane remained Minister of the Interior and was promoted to the rank of Minister of State. On March 31, 2008, he was moved to the post of Minister of State for Mines, Industry, and Small and Medium-Sized Enterprises.

The Sopi Coalition was defeated in the March 2009 local election in Saint-Louis. Ousmane Masseck Ndiaye, the head of the Sopi candidate list and Mayor of Saint-Louis, accused Ngom of contributing to the defeat by engaging in "factional activities". Ngom's spokesman, in turn, compared Ndiaye to a general blaming his troops for losing a battle, and he said that Ndiaye should take responsibility for the defeat by resigning from his government and party positions. Following the election, both Ngom and Ndiaye were excluded from the government of Prime Minister Souleymane Ndéné Ndiaye, which was appointed on May 1, 2009. Ngom was succeeded in his ministry by Ibrahima Cissé. However, Wade reversed himself within days, reappointing Ngom to his post as Minister of State for Mines, Industry, and Small and Medium-Sized Enterprises on May 4.

On 11 September 2010, Wade moved Ngom back to the interior portfolio. In the February–March 2012 presidential election, President Wade was defeated by Macky Sall, and consequently Ngom lost his post in the government when Sall took office in April 2012. He was subsequently one of 12 PDS candidates to be elected to the National Assembly in the July 2012 parliamentary election. On 30 July 2012, he said that the PDS deputies would do well in their new role as the parliamentary opposition because they benefited from having experience of government.
