= Augustin Diamacoune Senghor =

Senegalese politician (1928–2007)

Father Augustin Diamacoune Senghor (4 April 1928 – 13 January 2007) was a Catholic priest and a leading figure in the Casamance independence movement (see Casamance Conflict) from Senegal. He served as director of the Saint-Louis of Ziguinchor Seminary (Séminaire Saint-Louis de Ziguinchor) from 1972 until 1975.

Senghor was born in Senghalène, Casamance, Senegal in 1928. His father, Mathieu Diamacoune Senghor, a Serer, was one of the founding members and active militants of the Senegalese Democratic Bloc (French: Bloc Démocratique Sénégalais (BDS)) of President Senghor. His mother, Marthe Badiate is a Jola.

After spending five years in a Senegalese prison, Senghor became the leader of the Movement of Democratic Forces in Casamance (MFDC), Casamance's main rebel movement.

Senghor signed a peace agreement with the government of Senegalese President Abdoulaye Wade in 2004. However, several factions of the MFDC refused to participate in the peace deal and continued their fighting. This division has divided Casamance's independence movement.

Analysts say that the death of Father Senghor may make reaching a permanent peace deal in Casamance much more difficult. The Senegalese government will need to find a new head of the rebel and separatist movement to negotiate with in Senghor's place. However, this will not be easy, as the separatist movement has splintered into rival factions since the 2004 peace agreement. Incidents of violence has also increased in 2006. In late December 2006, the president of the Ziguinchor regional council was assassinated. The Senegalese government blamed Casamance's rebels.

== The Casamance Conflict ==
Born on April 4, 1928, Father Augustin Diamacoune Senghor would go on to be an influential person in the Casamance conflict. In 1967, Diamacoune started speaking on the topic of Casamance independence. In 1978, he published a booklet outlining the injustices that the people of Casamance had suffered as a result of the Senegalese government. Father Diamacoune began to get more involved in raising awareness of the Casamance conflict from 1980-1981. During this time, Diamacoune held conferences, wrote letters to the Senegalese authorities, and distributed pamphlets. Father Diamacoune was recognized as a leading figure in the movement for Casamance independence, and in 1984, after a series of protests in Ziguinchor, he was arrested and sentenced to 10 years for violating territorial integrity (Ag Mohamed and Humphreys, 2005). Approximately halfway through his 10-year sentence, Diamacoune was granted amnesty by President Diouf because the aggressive military action taken by the Senegalese government in response to the MFDC was not working and Diouf wanted to try negotiating a peace accord. Diamacoune went on to serve a total of 5 years in prison between 1984-1991, but was released on May 31, 1991, after Sidi Badji signed a ceasefire agreement with Senegalese Defence Minister Medoune (Fall, 2010).

Diamacoune promptly withdrew underground and retreated to Guinea Bissau. However, Father Diamacoune was still recognized as the leading figure in the MFDC, and in attempt to quell increasing violence from the MFDC, the Senegalese government pressured the government of Guinea Bissau to return Diamacoune. On March 19, 1993, Diamacoune was returned to Senegal and was greeted by a peace march in Ziguinchor consisting of around 10,000 people, organized by various civic groups. On April 8, 1993, Father Diamacoune broadcast a ceasefire appeal to all of Senegal, then went on to sign a ceasefire accord with the Senegalese government in Ziguinchor on July 8, 1993. However, after an escalation in the Casamance conflict, due in part to the MFDC's acquisition of more advanced weapons, Diamacoune was placed under house arrest on April 21, 1995.

A year later, in September 1996, Father Diamacoune successfully reunited the front nord through rapprochement with Sidy Badji. Because of the reunion of the two branches, the front nord had a more impactful voice in peace negotiations. Looking to seize upon the new opportunity, Diamacoune proposed peace negotiations between the MFDC and the Senegalese government. He suggested holding the negotiations in Paris in 1997, but the Senegalese government declined the proposition. In January 1999 in Ziguinchor, Father Diamacoune went on to meet with President Diouf for the first time ever. After the meeting, President Diouf addressed the Casamance people and urged them to forgive the Senegalese government, and to think about reconciliation (Fall, 2010). A period of peace was ushered in, characterized by peaceful marches under the leadership of women and religious leaders. However, Diouf lost the 2000 presidential elections and was succeeded by President Wade. In September 2001, for the first time since the beginning of the conflict, the leader of the MFDC was invited to meet the Senegalese president in his palace. The meeting between Father Diamacoune and President Wade resulted in increased economic activities in Casamance under the Programme de Reconstruction Economique et Sociale de la Casamance. As president of the MFDC, Diamacoune declared that the MFDC had obtained a state of satisfaction, and that there was no more reason to fight (Marut, 2004). The last peace accord between the MFDC and the Senegalese government was signed in December 2004.

Father Augustin Diamacoune Senghor died on January 13, 2007, in Val-de-Grâce Military Hospital, Paris, France.
