= Casamance conflict =

Ongoing low-level conflict in Senegal

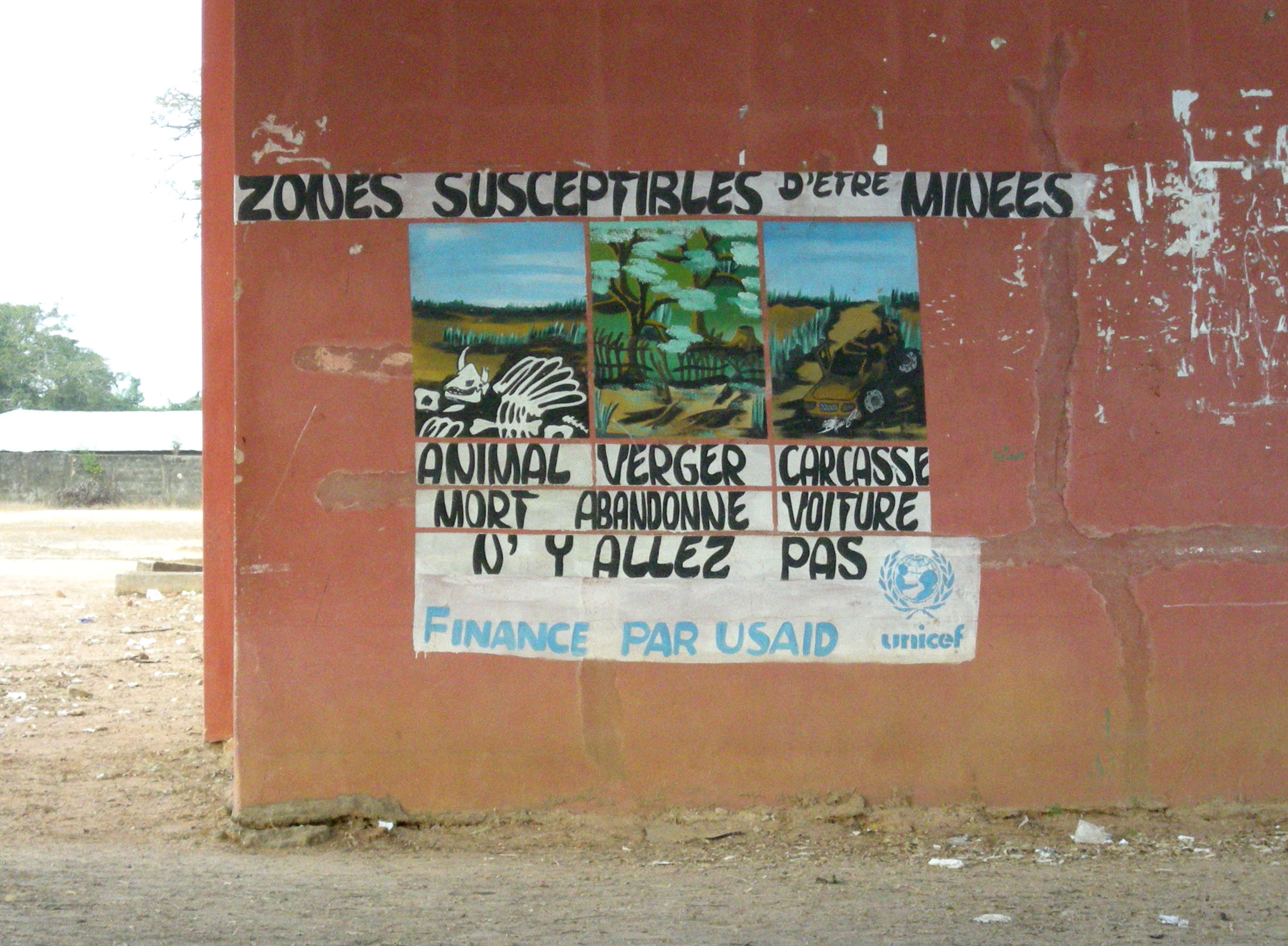
- Painting in Oussouye warning of land mines in the area.
Date	1982 – 1 May 2014 (main conflict); 2015 – present (low-level violence)
Location	Casamance, Senegal
Status	Ongoing low-level violence; Unilateral ceasefire by most MFDC factions; MFDC extremely weakened by 2021

Belligerents
Senegal; Guinea-Bissau (1998–1999, 2021); Turkey (2021, alleged by MFDC)	MFDC; Three main factions (Sadio, Badiatte, and Diatta Groups); Various splinter factions; Guinea-Bissau rebels (1998–1999)

Commanders and leaders
Abdou Diouf (1982–2000); Abdoulaye Wade (2000–2012); Macky Sall (2012–2024); Bassirou Diomaye Faye (from 2024); João Bernardo Vieira (1998–1999); Umaro Sissoco Embaló (2020–2025)	Augustin Diamacoune Senghor #; Salif Sadio (WIA); Caesar Badiatte; Mamadou Niantang Diatta; Adama Sané; Fatoma Coly (surrendered); Ansumane Mané (1998–99)

Strength
Armed Forces of Senegal: Thousands (2012)	300–600 (1989); 2,000–4,000 (2004); 180 (2006)

Casualties and losses
- 5,000 killed in total since 1982; 60,000 internally displaced

The Casamance conflict (French: Conflit en Casamance) is an ongoing low-level conflict that has been waged between the Government of Senegal and the Movement of Democratic Forces of Casamance (MFDC) since 1982. On 1 May 2014, the leader of the MFDC sued for peace and declared a unilateral ceasefire.

The MFDC has called for the independence of the Casamance region, whose population is religiously and ethnically distinct from the rest of Senegal. The bloodiest years of the conflict were during the 1992–2001 period and resulted in over a thousand battle related deaths.

On 30 December 2004, an agreement was reached between the MFDC and the government which promised to provide the voluntary integration of MFDC fighters into the country's paramilitary forces, economic recovery programmes for Casamance, de-mining and aid to returning refugees. Nevertheless, some hard-line factions of the MFDC soon defected from elements of the MFDC who had signed the agreement and no negotiations took place following the breakdown of talks in Foundiougne on 2 February 2005.

Fighting again emerged in 2010 and 2011 but waned following the April 2012 election of Macky Sall. Peace negotiations under the auspices of Saint Egidio community took place in Rome and on 14 December 2012, President Sall announced that Casamance would be a test-case for advanced decentralization policy.

== Background ==
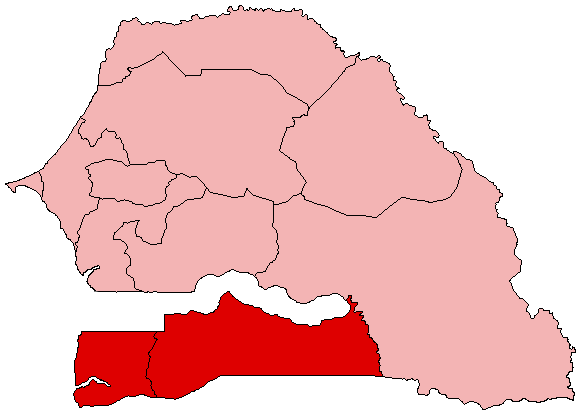
Map of the Casamance region (dark red) as part of wider Senegal

The distinct regional identity of the Casamance region has contributed to separatist arguments that distinguish the region and its people from the North.

=== Geography ===
The Casamance region is the southern region of Senegal which, although connected in the East, is separated from the rest of Senegal. The Gambia divides Senegal along nearly 300 kilometers by a width of 50 kilometers. Casamance contains two administrative regions named for their capitals: Ziguinchor to the west and Kolda to the east. The Ziguinchor region has been the most affected by the conflict, where it was initially confined. Beginning in 1995, the conflict spread into the Kolda region, largely affecting the department of Sédhiou.

The region's terrain differs from that of the northern Sahel landscape. Casamance terrain is filled with rivers, forests, and mangrove swamps.

=== Demographic and cultural differences ===
The principal inhabitants of the region are members of the Jola (Djiola, Diola) ethnic group, although they are overall a minority if all other ethnic groups of Casamance are combined. Besides Jola, the area also harbors Mandinka, Mankanya, Pulaar (a Fula group), Manjak, Balanta, Papel, Bainuk, and a small minority of Wolof. By contrast, the Wolof are the overall largest ethnic group in Senegal, dominating the north. The sentiment has existed amongst Jola that they do not benefit sufficiently from the region's richness and that Dakar, the capital, reaps most of the profit from the region's products. This feeling of unequal treatment is widespread in Casamance, even among those who do not support separatism. Many people within Casamance are Christians or animists, unlike the majority of Senegalese who are Muslims. However, relations between Senegal's Muslim and Christian populations have historically been mutually respectful, and religion has not played any significant role in the Casamance conflict.

=== Colonial rule ===
Though Senegal was colonized by France in the nineteenth century, Portugal was the first European country to make contact with the country. Portuguese administration was established in Ziguinchor in 1645 and remained until 1888. In the period which followed, French, Portuguese, and British powers competed for influence in the area. After French colonial rule was established, French Catholic missionaries concentrated their efforts among Jola in lower Casamance, along with the Serer ethnic group. The first proposal for the autonomy of Casamance emerged under French rule.

== Timeline ==
=== 1970s ===
In the late 1970s, a separatist movement first developed in Casamance. Political frustrations mounted from the lack of economic growth for Casamançais people. One of the recurring themes was that Northerners dominated the economy of the region. The administration in Ziguinchor was dominated by Northerners, predominantly of the Wolof ethnic group. Zinginchor and coastal areas underwent developmental expropriations, and many local officials from the northern regions gave relatives and clients access to land. This resulted in protests in Ziguinchor and Cap Skirring.

=== 1980s ===
In the 1980s, resentment about the marginalization and exploitation of Casamance by the Senegalese central government gave rise to an independence movement in form of the MFDC, which was officially founded in 1982. This initial movement managed to unite Jola and other ethnic groups in the region, such as Fulani, Mandinka and Bainuk, and led to rising popular resistance against the government and northerners.

On December 26, 1982, several hundred protesters gathered in Ziguinchor despite the arrest of most of the demonstration's leaders. This peaceful demonstration was attended by men and women of all classes as well as of Jola and other ethnic groups in the region. During the event, the protestors marched to the regional governor's office and replaced the Senegalese flag with a white flag. In response, the Senegalese government targeted Jola people.

The MFDC began to organise demonstrations, and tensions eventually escalated in massive riots in December 1983. On December 6, three gendarmes were killed while intervening at a MFDC meeting near Ziguinchor. On December 18, 1983, militants with weapons marched in Ziguinchor. This demonstration turned violent, with many casualties. Following this attack, the Senegalese government drove the MFDC underground into the forests. This caused the MDFC to form a more radicalized, armed wing that engaged in guerrilla combat against the Senegalese army and symbols of statehood in 1985. The armed wing was known as Attika ("warrior" in Diola). The Senegalese government answered by dividing the Casamance province into two smaller regions, probably in order to split and weaken the independence movement. This only heightened tensions, and the government began to jail MFDC leaders such as Augustin Diamacoune Senghor.

Another factor in the growing independence movement was the failure of the Senegambia Confederation in 1989, which had economically benefited Casamance and whose end only worsened the situation of Casamance's population. By the end of the 1980s, the military wing of the MDFC had an estimate of 300-600 trained fighters.

=== 1990s ===
The MFDC and other separatist groups originally used this vertical white-green-red tricolor as Casamance's national flag

The discovery of oil in the region emboldened the MFDC to organise mass demonstrations for immediate independence in 1990, which were brutally suppressed by the Senegalese military. This pushed the MFDC into a full armed rebellion. The following fighting was vicious, and 30,000 civilians were displaced by 1994. Several ceasefires were agreed during the 1990s, but none lasted, often also due to splits within the MFDC along ethnic lines and between those ready negotiate and those who refused to lay down their weapons. In 1992 the MFDC divided into two main groups, Front Sud and Front Nord. Whereas Front Sud was dominated by Jola and called for full independence, Front Nord included both Jola as well as non-Jola tribesmen and was ready to work with the government based on a failed agreement of 1991. Another ceasefire in 1993 led to the break-off of hardline rebel groups from the MFDC. These continued to attack the military. In 1994, Yahya Jammeh took power in the Gambia through a coup d'état. Jammeh would start to provide the MFDC with substantial support, and was even known to recruit MFDC fighters into the Gambian military, reportedly since they were more inclined to be loyal to Jammeh's regime than the people of the Gambia.

The Senegalese military relocated thousands of soldiers from the northern provinces to Casamance in 1995 in an attempt to finally crush the uprising. The northern soldiers often mistreated the local population and did not differentiate between those who supported the rebels and government loyalists. By this time, the rebels had established bases in Guinea-Bissau, reportedly being supplied with arms by Bissau-Guinean military commander Ansumane Mané. Mané's alleged support for the separatists was one factor which led to the Guinea-Bissau Civil War that erupted in 1998. When Senegal decided to send its military into Guinea-Bissau to fight for the local government against Mané's forces, the latter and the MFDC formed a full alliance. The two rebel movements started to fight side by side in both Senegal as well as Guinea-Bissau. Although the Senegal-supported government of Guinea-Bissau collapsed, the following MFDC-sympathetic regime was also overthrown in May 1999. Meanwhile, tensions within the MFDC resulted in rebel leader Salif Sadio killing 30 of his rivals; however, one of his main opponents among the insurgents, Caesar Badiatte, survived an assassination attempt.

In a renewed offensive against the separatists between April and June 1999, the Senegalese military shelled Casamance's de facto capital Ziguinchor for the first time, causing numerous civilian casualties and the displacement of 20,000 people along the Senegal–Guinea-Bissau border. From then on, fighting mostly took place in the eastern Kolda Region. Another attempt at peace talks started in December 1999, with Senegalese and MFDC representatives meeting in Banjul. Both sides agreed to a ceasefire. By the end of the 1990s, the MFDC had made little progress in both its diplomatic as well as militant attempts at furthering its cause. In addition, the party's reputation as a genuine separatist forces started to suffer, as it became evident that many MFDC commanders were less motivated by politics and more by money in their insurgency. Several would accept ceasefires with the Senegalese government as long as they received rewards by the authorities.

In 1999, Seynabou Male Cissé, a geography teacher in Ziguinchor, established the Regional Committee of Women's Solidarity for Peace in Casamance (French: Comité Régional de Solidarité des Femmes pour la Paix en Casamance), also known as Usoforal (Jola for "let's join hands"), which advocated for the "traditional" role of women as peacemakers in ending the Casamance conflict, as well as stressing the need for them to be part of peace talks and rebuilding efforts.

=== 2000s ===
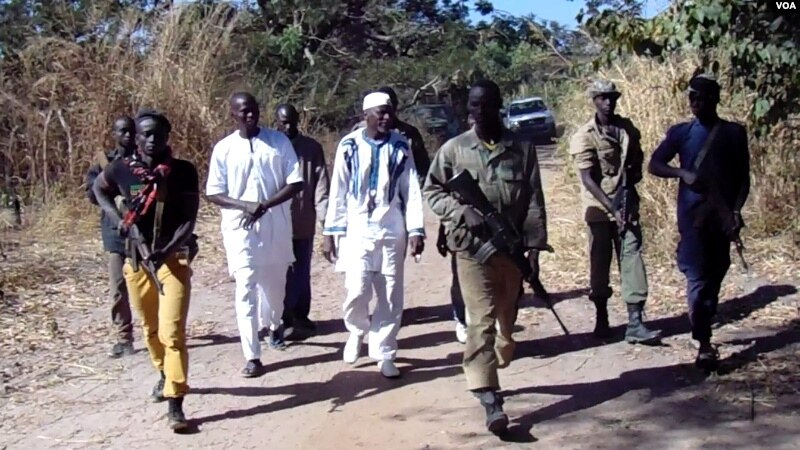
Photo of MFDC fighters, c. 2017

Peace talks resumed in January 2000, with both sides attempting to end the military conflict and aiming at restoring political and economic normality to Casamance. Discussions were held about the MFDC transforming into a political party, but the talks were hindered by the MFDC's factionalism, and the refusal of the Senegalese government to even consider Casamance's independence. As result, the peace talks collapsed in November 2000, with MFDC leader Augustin Diamacoune Senghor declaring that his group would continue to fight until achieving independence. A new ceasefire was agreed to in March 2001, but failed to stop the conflict. Meanwhile, internal divisions deepened among the MFDC about the movement's aims and Senghor's leadership.

On 30 December 2004, the two sides of the conflict signed a truce, which lasted until August 2006.

Since the split, low-level fighting has continued in the region. Another round of negotiations took place in 2005. Its results proved partial, and armed clashes between the MFDC and the army continued in 2006, prompting thousands of civilians to flee across the border to the Gambia. At the same time, the MFDC factions of Sadio and Badiatte also fought each other.

On 13 January 2007, Senghor died in Paris. His death hastened the split of the MDFC, which divided into three major armed factions, led by Salif Sadio, Caesar Badiatte, and Mamadou Niantang Diatta respectively. In addition, several smaller groups also emerged later on. Sadio claimed overall leadership of the MFDC's armed wing.

On 9 June 2009, radical MDFC militants killed a former MFDC member, who at the time was serving as a peace process mediator.

=== 2010s ===
By the 2010s, the MFDC had adopted a new flag for their rebellion

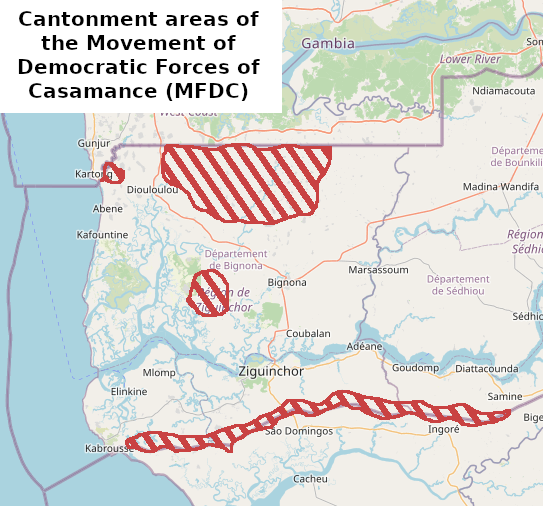
Map of areas with MFDC presence, around 2017

In October 2010, an illegal shipment of arms from Iran was seized in Lagos, Nigeria. The Senegalese government suspected that the arms were destined for the Casamance, and recalled its ambassador to Tehran over the matter. Heavy fighting occurred in December 2010 when about 100 MDFC fighters attempted to take Bignona south of the Gambian border supported by heavy weapons, such as mortars and machine guns. They were repulsed with several casualties by Senegalese soldiers who suffered seven dead in the engagement.

On 21 December 2011, Senegal media reported that 12 soldiers were killed in Senegal's Casamance region following a separatist rebel attack on an army base near the town of Bignona.

Three soldiers were killed during a clash 50 kilometers (31 mi) north of Ziguinchor. The Senegalese government blamed the conflict on separatists in the region on February 14, 2012.

Two attacks occurred on 11 and 23 March 2012, leaving 4 soldiers killed and 8 injured.

Since April 2012, peace in the Casamance has been a top priority for the administration of Senegalese President Macky Sall.

On 3 February 2013, four people were killed during a bank robbery perpetrated by the MFDC in the town of Kafoutine; the rebels stole a total of $8,400.

On 1 May 2014, one of the leaders of the MFDC, Salif Sadio, sued for peace and declared a unilateral ceasefire after secret talks held at the Vatican between his forces and the Government of Senegal led by Macky Sall. Sadio consequently lost much power among MFDC, with much of the movement no longer regarding him as leader.

In 2016, a presidential election resulted in the surprise defeat of Yahya Jammeh who had ruled the Gambia autocratically since 1994. He refused to accept his defeat, leading to a constitutional crisis. The Economic Community of West African States responded with a military intervention in 2017 during which MFDC rebels supported pro-Jammeh forces. Jammeh ultimately fled, resulting in Adama Barrow becoming the Gambia's president; he was known as being close to Macky Sall, meaning that the MFDC lost an important foreign ally.

Members of the group were suspected of being behind an ambush that left 13 people dead near the town of Ziguinchor on 6 January 2018. Leaders of the MFDC, however, have denied responsibility for the execution-style killing, which they say was connected with the illegal harvesting of teak wood and rosewood from the forested region, not the gathering of firewood.

=== 2020s ===
By 2020, most MFDC factions, including those of Badiate and Sadio, were still upholding ceasefires. In April of that year, tensions in the MFDC's Sikoun faction operating in the Goudomp Department resulted in a split. Diatta, until then leader of the faction, fell under suspicions of being in contact with the government. Adama Sané consequently assumed command of the Sikoun faction, even though Diatta maintained his own following. There was a general lull in fighting during 2020. However, an ally of Senegalese President Macky Sall, Umaro Sissoco Embaló, became President of Guinea-Bissau in that year, resulting in an increased cooperation of the countries.

On 26 January 2021, the Armed Forces of Senegal began an offensive against the MFDC factions of Sané and Diatta. The operation included 2,600 infantry, 11 Panhard AMLs, as well as artillery, and was supported by the Senegalese Air Force. The Senegalese forces were commanded by Lieutenant Colonel Mathieu Diogoye Sène and Lieutenant Colonel Clément Hubert Boucaly. With aid by the military of Guinea-Bissau, Senegalese troops overran four MFDC bases in Blaze forest during February, namely those at Bouman, Boussouloum, Badiong, Sikoun. The MFDC also alleged the involvement of the Turkish Armed Forces on the side of Senegal. At Badjom, the government forces seized a significant amount of rebel weaponry including mortars. The Senegalese troops also seized several hectares of marijuana cultivation. Both the military as well as the rebels claimed to have inflicted casualties on each other. Despite the offensive's success, the Senegalese military admitted that several rebel bases remained active, as neither the hardline Diakaye faction of Fatoma Coly (which supports Sané and Diatta) nor the groups of Sadio and Badiatte had been targeted. However, security analyst Andrew McGregor argued that the ease with which the Senegalese military had overrun the MFDC bases during the offensive pointed at the separatists having become extremely weak. He concluded that "the movement has clearly lost any broad support it might have once enjoyed".

From May to June 2021, the Senegalese military launched another counter-insurgency operation, this time in the area around Badème. Its aim was to close the border to Guinea-Bissau for the rebels and reduce wood as well as drug smuggling, and the army claimed to have captured several MFDC posts and bases. In January 2022, MFDC rebels attacked Senegalese soldiers operating as part of the ECOWAS mission in the Gambia, killing four and capturing seven. Though the prisoners were later released, the Senegalese military took this incident as reason for launching an operation against the Sadio faction which operated at the Senegalese-Gambian border. The offensive started on 13 March 2022, and caused 6,000 civilians to flee across the border into the Gambia.

In early August 2022, Caesar Badiatte signed a peace deal with the Senegalese government following mediation by Guinea-Bissau's President Umaro Sissoco Embaló. Though Badiatte only agreed on behalf of his faction, the government expressed hope that other MFDC groups would join the agreement. On 16 January 2023, the Senegalese military clashed with MFDC rebels near Bignona during an operation to disrupt rebel attempts to set up new bases at the Gambian border. One soldier was killed and four wounded. The military continued anti-insurgent sweeps at the border over the next months. In May 2023, Fatoma Coly's forces -about 250 fighters- surrendered, with President Macky Sall's government subsequently organizing their reintegration into civil society. In December 2023, four soldiers were killed when their vehicle hit a rebel anti-tank mine in the Bignona area. In February 2024, heavy protests erupted in Casamance over the delay of the next presidential election; clashes between protestors and security forces resulted in at least three deaths.

On 25 February 2025, Senegalese Prime Minister Ousmane Sonko declared that he had reached an agreement with MFDC elements to end the conflict following talks hosted and mediated by Guinea-Bissau. Similar to the 2022 deal, the agreement was signed between the Senegalese government and the Badiatte faction, with latter agreeing to disarm. In contrast, the MFDC's Sadio faction did not agree to the deal.
