= Djibo Leyti Kâ =

Senegalese politician (1948–2017)

Djibo Leyti Kâ (21 February 1948 – 14 September 2017) was a Senegalese politician and the Secretary-General of the Union for Democratic Renewal (URD). He was a prominent minister under President Abdou Diouf from 1981 to 1995 and founded the URD in 1998 after splitting from Diouf's Socialist Party (PS). From 2004 to 2012, he again served in the government under President Abdoulaye Wade, initially as Minister of State for Maritime Economy and then as Minister of State for the Environment beginning in 2007. Man of the state, he then was appointed Minister under Macky Sall's government before becoming the Director of the CNDT.

== Career ==
Kâ was born in Thiarny, located in Louga Region. He was Deputy Governor of Saint-Louis Region from 1975 to 1976, then Technical Adviser and Deputy Director of the Cabinet of President Leopold Sedar Senghor from 1976 to 1977. From 1978 to 1980, he was Director of the Cabinet of the President. When Abdou Diouf succeeded Senghor as President, Kâ became a member of the government; he was Minister of Communications from January 1981 to April 1988 (and was additionally responsible for relations with the assemblies from 1983 to 1988), Minister of Planning and Cooperation from 1988 to 1990, and Minister of National Education from 1990 to 1991. On April 8, 1991, he became Foreign Minister of Senegal, serving in that position until June 1, 1993; he was then moved to the position of Minister of State for the Interior, serving in that position until March 1995, when he was dismissed from the government.

Kâ subsequently formed the Renewal Movement within the governing Socialist Party (PS) to seek internal party reforms, and this move seriously divided the PS in late 1997. The PS steering committee rejected the formation of the Movement, and President Diouf expressed agreement with the steering committee's decision. Subsequently, on November 19, 1997, Kâ and ten other leading members of the Movement were suspended from the PS for three months by the party's Political Bureau. Kâ and his supporters were publicly denounced by the party in March 1998 and resigned from the party in early April 1998. The government also restricted him from travelling outside of Senegal, but the actions taken against him had the effect of raising his national profile greatly, and he was thus able to find more candidates to run alongside him in the May 1998 parliamentary election. His newly formed Union for Democratic Renewal (URD) received about 13% of the vote and won eleven seats in the National Assembly in that election. Kâ was one of the successful URD candidates, and he was President of the Democracy and Freedoms Parliamentary Group in the National Assembly from July 1998 to January 2001; he also became Secretary-General of URD in July 1998.

Kâ ran as the URD candidate in the February 2000 presidential election, placing fourth with about 7.1% of the vote. He initially supported the opposition candidate, Abdoulaye Wade, for the second round, but then switched his support to Diouf a few days before the second round was held, following a televised appeal from Diouf for Kâ's support. There was speculation that Diouf would appoint Kâ as Prime Minister if he was re-elected, but Wade defeated Diouf in the run-off, which was held on March 19.

In the April 2001 parliamentary election, Kâ was re-elected to the National Assembly through national list proportional representation as an URD candidate. Following that election, he became President of the Justice, Democracy, Culture, and Communication Commission in the National Assembly. President Wade later appointed Kâ to the government as Minister of State for Maritime Economy and International Maritime Transport on April 21, 2004. He and the URD supported Wade's bid for re-election in the February 2007 presidential election, and Kâ claimed that his party made a decisive contribution to Wade's victory in the first round.

In the June 2007 parliamentary election, Kâ was elected to the National Assembly on a departmental list of the Sopi Coalition. On July 5, 2007, Kâ's ministerial portfolio was changed from Maritime Economy and International Maritime Transport to the Environment, the Protection of Nature, Retention Basins and Artificial Lakes; he retained the rank of Minister of State. Kâ, speaking in the National Assembly on August 8, 2007, urged the creation of an African coalition to work against the effects of rising sea levels caused by global warming.

Wade was defeated by opposition candidate Macky Sall in the February–March 2012 presidential election, and Kâ lost his government post when Sall succeeded Wade in April 2012. The parties that had supported Wade performed poorly in the July 2012 parliamentary election, but Kâ nevertheless won a seat. He decided not to join any parliamentary group in the National Assembly, sitting as a non-inscrit. Once again in opposition, Kâ was scathing in his criticism of President Sall. However, on 21 December 2015 he was appointed as President of the National Commission for Territorial Dialogue, an advisory body created by Sall. He died on 14 September 2017 at the age of 69.
