= Souleymane Ndéné Ndiaye =

Senegalese politician

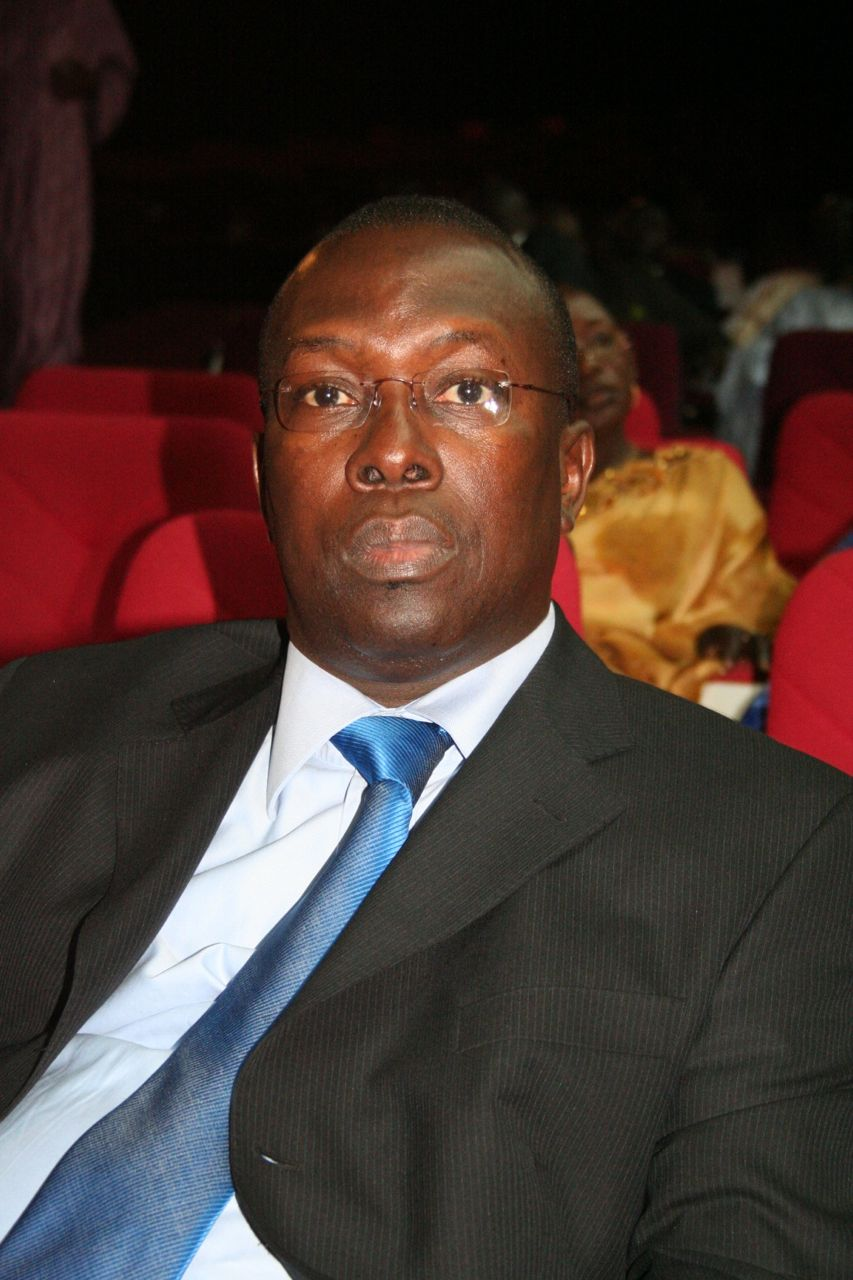
Image of Souleymane Ndéné Ndiaye

Souleymane Ndéné Ndiaye (born 6 August 1958) is a Senegalese politician who was Prime Minister of Senegal from 2009 to 2012. He was Minister of the Civil Service and Labour in 2005, Director of the Cabinet of the President of the Republic from 2005 to 2007, and Minister of State for the Maritime Economy from 2007 to 2009. A lawyer by profession, Ndiaye is the president of the National Union for the People (UNP). He was also Mayor of Guinguinéo.

== Political career ==
Ndiaye was born in Kaolack in 1958 and was first elected as Mayor of Guinguinéo in 2002. He served as Spokesman of President Abdoulaye Wade and as a Special Adviser to President Wade. He was first appointed to the Senegalese government as Minister of the Civil Service, Labour, Employment, and Professional Organizations on 9 March 2005. Adama Sall was appointed to replace Ndiaye in his ministry on 8 August 2005, and Ndiaye was moved to the position of Director of the Cabinet of the President of the Republic.

Ndiaye was elected to the National Assembly of Senegal in the June 2007 parliamentary election as a departmental candidate of the Sopi Coalition. He was then appointed to the government as Minister of State for the Environment and the Protection of Nature on 19 June 2007, as part of the government of Prime Minister Cheikh Hadjibou Soumaré, before being quickly moved to the position of Minister of State for the Maritime Economy on 5 July 2007. His ministerial portfolio was expanded to including fishing on 3 December 2007, and later it was expanded again to also include maritime transport.

Ndiaye was re-elected as Mayor of Guinguinéo in the March 2009 local elections; he was one of the only ministers and PDS leaders to prevail in the local elections, in which the opposition made large gains. Following the election, Prime Minister Soumaré resigned and President Abdoulaye Wade appointed Ndiaye as prime minister on 30 April 2009.

Ndiaye and Wade's son, Karim Wade, were widely viewed as having been at odds at the time of Ndiaye's appointment. Ndiaye nevertheless met with Karim Wade on 1 May 2009 and offered him a position in the new government, which Wade accepted. Ndiaye spoke positively of Karim Wade and downplayed suggestions that the two had a difficult relationship; he acknowledged their "political differences", but said this was "normal" and that there were "no problems" between them. It was widely believed that President Wade was grooming Karim to succeed him, and therefore all moves related to Karim were considered especially significant.

Ndiaye is a member of the PDS Political Bureau and the PDS Steering Committee. He has also served as First Vice-President of the Regional Council of Fatick.

In the February–March 2012 presidential election, President Wade was defeated by Macky Sall, and consequently Ndiaye lost his post as Prime Minister when Sall took office in April 2012. He was subsequently one of 12 PDS candidates elected to the National Assembly in the July 2012 parliamentary election. He nevertheless resigned from his parliamentary seat on 27 December 2012, while saying that he would remain Mayor of Guinguinéo. He also stressed that he remained loyal to Abdoulaye Wade and would not defect to the ruling party.

In May 2015 Ndiaye founded a new opposition party, the National Union for the People (UNP). He spoke warmly of Wade, but said that he felt the need to pursue his own "political destiny" by leaving the PDS. He declared that he "want[ed] to offer the Senegalese a new vision of politics".

Political offices
Preceded by Cheikh Hadjibou Soumaré	Prime Minister of Senegal; 2009–2012	Succeeded by Abdoul Mbaye
