= Cheikh Hadjibou Soumaré =

Prime Minister of Senegal, 2007–2009

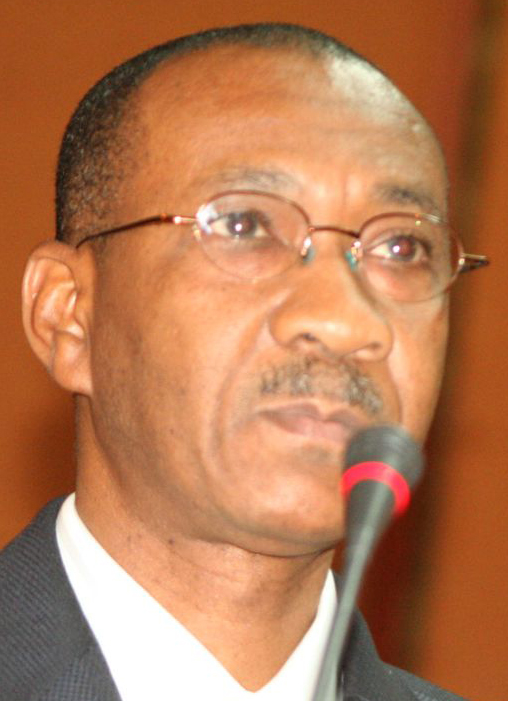

Prime Minister of Senegal
- In office 19 June 2007 – 30 April 2009
- President: Abdoulaye Wade
- Preceded by: Macky Sall
- Succeeded by: Souleymane Ndéné Ndiaye

Personal details
- Born: 24 October 1951 (age 74) Dakar, Senegal (then a French colony)
- Party: Independent

Cheikh Hadjibou Soumaré (born 24 October 1951) was Prime Minister of Senegal from 2007 to 2009 and Chairman of the Commission of the West African Economic and Monetary Union from 2011 to 2016.

== Life and career ==
Soumaré was born in Dakar and raised in Thiès. He was provisional administrator of the Bank of Credit and Commerce International Sénégal from September 1991 to September 1995, then technical advisor to the Ministry of the Economy, Finance and the Plan from October 1995 to July 1996, Director of Budget from July 16, 1996, to August 1, 2000, and Director-General of Finance from August 1, 2000 to May 23, 2001.

He entered the government as Minister-Delegate for the Budget and Housing at the Ministry of the Economy and Finance on May 23, 2001. He remained Minister-Delegate for the Budget until he was appointed as prime minister by President Abdoulaye Wade on June 19, 2007, following a parliamentary election on June 3.

Soumaré was considered a technocrat and was not a member of Wade's Senegalese Democratic Party (PDS). The Sopi Coalition, of which the PDS was part, won a large majority of seats in the parliamentary election, which was the subject of an opposition boycott. Soumaré's government, with 37 members (excluding Soumaré), was also named on June 19; it was similar to the previous government of Macky Sall and did not include the opposition. Soumaré and the new government were sworn in on June 21. On December 3, 2007, Soumaré's government was reduced in size to 28 members.

Following the March 2009 local elections, in which the opposition made broad gains, Soumaré resigned for reasons related to "personal convenience" and Wade appointed Souleymane Ndéné Ndiaye, Minister of State for the Maritime Economy, to succeed Soumaré on April 30, 2009.

Later, Soumaré was appointed by the heads of state of the countries comprising the West African Economic and Monetary Union (UEMOA) as Chairman of the UEMOA Commission on 16 November 2011; he was sworn in on 5 December 2011. After nearly five years in office, he announced his resignation from that post on 29 September 2016, effective on 1 December 2016.

Political offices
Preceded by Macky Sall	Prime Minister of Senegal; 2007 – 2009	Succeeded by Souleymane Ndéné Ndiaye
