= Médoune Fall =

Minister of the Interior
- In office January 1981 – April 1983
- President: Abdou Diouf
- Preceded by: Jean Collin
- Succeeded by: Ibrahima Wone

Personal details
- Born: 21 July 1919 Saint-Louis, Senegal
- Died: 3 February 2007 (aged 87) Dakar

Military service
- Allegiance: Senegal

Médoune Fall (born July 21, 1919, in Saint-Louis, died in Dakar on February 3, 2007) was a Senegalese politician and diplomat, former Minister of the Interior, then of the Armed Forces, under President Abdou Diouf between 1981 and 1993.

== Career ==
After graduating at the École normale supérieure William Ponty, he began his career in territorial administration as District Commander in Podor (formerly the River Region), then in Bambey (Diourbel Region), before being appointed Governor of Diourbel by former President Léopold Sédar Senghor. From governance, he moved to the Senegalese Agricultural Marketing Office (OCA), the predecessor of the former ONCAD.

He served as Permanent Representative of Senegal to the United Nations from 1971 to 1979. He also served as Senegal's Ambassador to France, in Brussels, in Moscow during the Soviet era, and in Tokyo.

In the first confederal cabinet, formed on November 4, 1982, he served as Confederal Minister of Security.

Succeeding Jean Collin, he was Minister of the Interior from January 1981 to April 1983. He was replaced by Ibrahima Wone.

In the first Niasse government, formed on April 5, 1983, he was Minister of the Armed Forces.
