= Addis (name) =

Addis is both a surname and a given name. Notable people with the name include:

Surname:

- Alfred Shea Addis (1832–1886), American photographer
- Ben Addis, Welsh actor
- Bob Addis (1925–2016), American former baseball player
- Charles Addis (1902–1983), English cricketer
- Charles Stewart Addis (1861–1945), Scottish banker
- Don Addis (1935–2009), American comic book artist
- Donna Rose Addis, New Zealand psychologist
- Fikirte Addis (born 1981), Ethiopian fashion designer
- Jim Addis, American politician
- John Addis (1914–1983), British diplomat and collector of Ming porcelain
- John Patrick Addis (1950–2006), American murderer
- Icer Addis, American emulator developer and video game designer who made NESticle and Genecyst
- Kristi Addis (born 1971), American beauty queen
- Mabel Addis (1912–2004), American writer, teacher, and video game designer
- Mark Addis (born 1969), British philosopher
- Martha L. Addis (1878–1942), American jeweler
- Michael Addis, television and film director
- Richard Addis (born 1956), British journalist and entrepreneur
- Robina Addis (1900–1986), British psychiatrist
- Thomas Addis (1881–1949), British-American physician-scientist
- William Addis (disambiguation)
- Yda Hillis Addis (1857–c.1902), American author

Given name:

- Addis Abebe (born 1970), Ethiopian long-distance runner
- Addis Gezahegn (born 1969), Ethiopian long-distance runner
- Addis Hintsa (born 1987), Ethiopian footballer
- Addis Mussa, known as Raptile (born 1976), German-Ethiopian singer
- Addis Pablo, Jamaican reggae musician
- Addis Priestley (1903–1984), Australian footballer
