= August 3 =

August 3 this year in various calendars
- Monday, 3 August 2026
Akan	Fodwo
Armenian	14 Nawasardi 1476
Aztec	Pānquetzaliztli 5, 11 Ācatl
Babylonian	19 Du'uzu, 2337 SE
Balinese pawukon	Luang, Pepet, Pasah, Jaya, Paing, Tungleh, Coma of Merakih, Kala, Dangu, Duka
Bengali	19 Shrabon, BS 1433
Chinese	Yin Earth Rooster・Roof Mansion; Fire Horse Year, Month 6, Day 21 (Dashu, 4 days until Liqiu)
Common Era	3 August 2026 CE
Coptic	27 Epip, AM 1742
Egyptian	19 Choiak, 2775 NE
Ethiopian	27 Ḥamlē, 2018 Amätä Məhrät
French Republican	Décade II, Sextidi de Thermidor de l'Année 234 de la République
Gregorian	3 August, AD 2026
Hebrew	20 Av, AM 5786
Hindu	Uttarabhādrapada・Sukarman; Solar: 18 Śrāvaṇa, 1948 SE; Lunisolar: Pañcamī, Kṛishna pakṣa of Āṣāḍha, 2083 VE; Rāudra・5127 KY・1,872,790
Icelandic	Mánudagur, 9 Heyannir 2026
Islamic	18 Safar, AH 1448 (using tabular method)
ISO week date	2026-W32-1
Japanese	21 Minazuki, Reiwa 8 (Taisho, 4 days until Risshū)
Julian	21 July, AD 2026 (AM 7534)
Julian day	2461256
Korean	21 Yangdal, 4359 DE
Maya	13.0.13.14.13; 6 Yaxkin, 11 Ben
Roman	ante diem XII Kalendas Augustas, MMDCCLXXIX AUC
Solar Hijri	12 Mordad, SH 1405
Tibetan	20 chu stod, me pho rta 2153 or 1772 or 1000

<<	August					>>
Su	Mo	Tu	We	Th	Fr	Sa
						1
2	3	4	5	6	7	8
9	10	11	12	13	14	15
16	17	18	19	20	21	22
23	24	25	26	27	28	29
30	31
2026

August 3 in recent years
2026 (Monday)
2025 (Sunday)
2024 (Saturday)
2023 (Thursday)
2022 (Wednesday)
2021 (Tuesday)
2020 (Monday)
2019 (Saturday)
2018 (Friday)
2017 (Thursday)

August 3 is the 215th day of the year (216th in leap years) in the Gregorian calendar; 150 days remain until the end of the year.

== Events ==
=== Pre-1600 ===
- 8 – Roman Empire general Tiberius defeats the Dalmatae on the river Bosna.
- 435 – Deposed Ecumenical Patriarch of Constantinople Nestorius, considered the originator of Nestorianism, is exiled by Roman Emperor Theodosius II to a monastery in Egypt.
- 881 – Battle of Saucourt-en-Vimeu: Louis III of France defeats the Vikings, an event celebrated in the poem Ludwigslied.
- 908 – Battle of Eisenach: An invading Hungarian force defeats an East Frankish army under Duke Burchard of Thuringia.
- 1031 – Olaf II of Norway is canonized as Saint Olaf by Grimketel, the English Bishop of Selsey.
- 1057 – Frederick of Lorraine elected as Pope Stephen IX.
- 1342 – The Siege of Algeciras commences during the Spanish Reconquista.
- 1347 – The city of Calais surrenders after a protracted siege to the English following the English defeat of a French relief fleet in the battle of Crotoy. It will remain in English hands for more than 200 years.
- 1492 – Christopher Columbus sets sail from Palos de la Frontera, Spain.
- 1527 – The first known letter from North America is sent by John Rut while at St. John's, Newfoundland.

=== 1601–1900 ===
- 1601 – Long War: Austria captures Transylvania in the Battle of Goroszló.
- 1645 – Thirty Years' War: The Second Battle of Nördlingen sees French forces defeating those of the Holy Roman Empire.
- 1678 – Robert LaSalle builds the Le Griffon, the first known ship built on the Great Lakes.
- 1692 – British-Dutch forces under William III defending the city of Brussels fight an inconclusive battle at Steenkerque against a French army under the duke of Luxembourg, with both sides suffering heavy casualties.
- 1778 – The theatre La Scala in Milan is inaugurated with the première of Antonio Salieri's Europa riconosciuta.
- 1795 – Treaty of Greenville is signed, ending the Northwest Indian War in the Ohio Country.
- 1811 – First ascent of Jungfrau, third highest summit in the Bernese Alps by brothers Johann Rudolf and Hieronymus Meyer.
- 1829 – The Treaty of Lewistown is signed by the Shawnee and Seneca peoples, exchanging land in Ohio for land west of the Mississippi River.
- 1852 – Harvard University wins the first Boat Race between Yale University and Harvard. The race is also known as the first ever American intercollegiate athletic event.
- 1859 – The American Dental Association is founded in Niagara Falls, New York.
- 1889 – An Anglo-Egyptian army defeats a Mahdist-Sudanese army in the battle of Toski.
- 1900 – The Firestone Tire and Rubber Company is founded.

=== 1901–present ===
- 1903 – Macedonian rebels in Kruševo proclaim the Kruševo Republic, which exists for only ten days before Ottoman Turks lay waste to the town.
- 1907 – Judge Kenesaw Mountain Landis fines Standard Oil of Indiana a record $29.4 million for illegal rebating to freight carriers; the conviction and fine are later reversed on appeal.
- 1914 – World War I: Germany declares war against France, while Romania declares its neutrality.
- 1921 – Major League Baseball Commissioner Kenesaw Mountain Landis confirms the ban of the eight Chicago Black Sox, the day after they were acquitted by a Chicago court.
- 1936 – Jesse Owens wins the 100 metre dash, defeating Ralph Metcalfe, at the Berlin Olympics.
- 1936 – A fire wipes out Kursha-2 in the Meshchera Lowlands, Ryazan Oblast, Russia, killing 1,200 and leaving only 20 survivors.
- 1940 – World War II: Italian forces begin the invasion of British Somaliland.
- 1946 – Santa Claus Land, the world's first themed amusement park, opens in Santa Claus, Indiana, United States.
- 1948 – Whittaker Chambers accuses Alger Hiss of being a communist and a spy for the Soviet Union.
- 1949 – The Basketball Association of America and the National Basketball League finalize the merger that would create the National Basketball Association.
- 1958 – The world's first nuclear submarine, the USS Nautilus, becomes the first vessel to complete a submerged transit of the geographical North Pole.
- 1959 – Portugal's state police force PIDE fires upon striking workers in Bissau, Portuguese Guinea, killing over 50 people.
- 1960 – Niger gains independence from France.
- 1972 – The United States Senate ratifies the Anti-Ballistic Missile Treaty.
- 1975 – A privately chartered Boeing 707 strikes a mountain peak and crashes near Agadir, Morocco, killing 188.
- 1977 – Tandy Corporation announces the TRS-80, one of the world's first mass-produced personal computers.
- 1981 – Senegalese opposition parties, under the leadership of Mamadou Dia, launch the Antiimperialist Action Front – Suxxali Reew Mi.
- 1997 – Oued El-Had and Mezouara massacre in Algeria: A total of 116 villagers killed, 40 in Oued El-Had and 76 in Mezouara.
- 1997 – Sky Tower in downtown Auckland, New Zealand opens after two-and-a-half years of construction, becoming the tallest free-standing structure in the Southern Hemisphere at the time.
- 2004 – The pedestal of the Statue of Liberty reopens after being closed since the September 11 attacks.
- 2005 – President of Mauritania Maaouya Ould Sid'Ahmed Taya is overthrown in a military coup while attending the funeral of King Fahd in Saudi Arabia.
- 2007 – Former deputy director of the Chilean secret police Raúl Iturriaga is captured after having been on the run following a conviction for kidnapping.
- 2010 – Widespread rioting erupts in Karachi, Pakistan, after the assassination of a local politician, leaving at least 85 dead and at least 17 billion Pakistani rupees (US$200 million) in damage.
- 2014 – A 6.1 magnitude earthquake kills at least 617 people and injures more than 2,400 in Yunnan, China.
- 2014 – The genocide of Yazidis by ISIL begins.
- 2018 – Two burka-clad men kill 29 people and injure more than 80 in a suicide attack on a Shia mosque in eastern Afghanistan.
- 2019 – Six hundred protesters, including opposition leader Lyubov Sobol, are arrested in an election protest in Moscow, Russia.
- 2019 – Twenty-three people are killed and 22 injured in a mass shooting at a Walmart in El Paso, Texas.
- 2023 – Major floods hit parts of Slovenia.

== Births ==
=== Pre-1600 ===
- 1442 – Galeotto I Pico, Duke of Mirandola (died 1499)
- 1486 – Imperia Cognati, Italian courtesan (died 1512)
- 1491 – Maria of Jülich-Berg, German noblewoman (died 1543)
- 1509 – Étienne Dolet, French scholar and translator (died 1546)

=== 1601–1900 ===
- 1622 – Wolfgang Julius, Count of Hohenlohe-Neuenstein, German field marshal (died 1698)
- 1692 – John Henley, English minister and poet (died 1759)
- 1724 – Alvise Foscari, Venetian admiral (died 1790)
- 1766 – Aaron Chorin, Hungarian rabbi and author (died 1844)
- 1770 – Frederick William III of Prussia (died 1840)
- 1803 – Joseph Paxton, English gardener and architect, designed The Crystal Palace (died 1865)
- 1808 – Hamilton Fish, American lawyer and politician, 26th United States Secretary of State (died 1893)
- 1811 – Elisha Otis, American businessman, founded the Otis Elevator Company (died 1861)
- 1817 – Archduke Albrecht, Duke of Teschen (died 1895)
- 1823 – Thomas Francis Meagher, Irish-American revolutionary and military leader, territorial governor of Montana (died 1867)
- 1823 – Francisco Asenjo Barbieri, Spanish clarinetist, composer, and musicologist (died 1894)
- 1832 – Ivan Zajc, Croatian composer, conductor, and director (died 1914)
- 1837 – Julien Reverchon, French botanist (died 1905)
- 1840 – John Bigham, 1st Viscount Mersey, English jurist and politician (died 1929)
- 1850 – Reginald Heber Roe, English-Australian swimmer, tennis player, and academic (died 1926)
- 1856 – Alfred Deakin, Australian lawyer and politician, 2nd Prime Minister of Australia (died 1919)
- 1860 – William Kennedy Dickson, French-Scottish actor, director, and producer (died 1935)
- 1863 – Géza Gárdonyi, Hungarian author and journalist (died 1922)
- 1867 – Stanley Baldwin, English businessman and politician, Prime Minister of the United Kingdom (died 1947)
- 1871 – Vernon Louis Parrington, American historian and scholar (died 1929)
- 1872 – Haakon VII of Norway (died 1957)
- 1886 – Maithili Sharan Gupt, Indian poet and playwright (died 1964)
- 1887 – Rupert Brooke, English poet (died 1915)
- 1887 – August Wesley, Finnish journalist, trade unionist, and revolutionary (died ?)
- 1890 – Konstantin Melnikov, Russian architect, designed the Rusakov Workers' Club (died 1974)
- 1894 – Harry Heilmann, American baseball player and sportscaster (died 1951)
- 1895 – Allen Bathurst, Lord Apsley, English politician (died 1942)
- 1896 – Ralph Horween, American football player and coach (died 1997)
- 1899 – Louis Chiron, Monegasque race car driver (died 1979)
- 1900 – Ernie Pyle, American soldier and journalist (died 1945)
- 1900 – John T. Scopes, American educator (died 1970)

=== 1901–present ===
- 1901 – John C. Stennis, American lawyer and politician (died 1995)
- 1901 – Stefan Wyszyński, Polish cardinal (died 1981)
- 1902 – Regina Jonas, German rabbi (died 1944)
- 1902 – David Buttolph, American film composer (died 1983)
- 1903 – Habib Bourguiba, Tunisian journalist and politician, 1st President of the Republic of Tunisia (died 2000)
- 1904 – Dolores del Río, Mexican actress (died 1983)
- 1904 – Clifford D. Simak, American journalist and author (died 1988)
- 1905 – Franz König, Austrian cardinal (died 2004)
- 1907 – Lawrence Brown, American trombonist and composer (died 1988)
- 1907 – Ernesto Geisel, Brazilian general and politician, 29th President of Brazil (died 1996)
- 1907 – Yang Shangkun, Chinese politician, and President of China (died 1998)
- 1909 – Walter Van Tilburg Clark, American author and educator (died 1971)
- 1911 – Alex McCrindle, Scottish actor and producer (died 1990)
- 1912 – Fritz Hellwig, German politician (died 2017)
- 1913 – Mel Tolkin, Ukrainian-American screenwriter and producer (died 2007)
- 1916 – Shakeel Badayuni, Indian poet and songwriter (died 1970)
- 1916 – José Manuel Moreno, Argentinian footballer and manager (died 1978)
- 1917 – Les Elgart, American trumpet player and bandleader (died 1995)
- 1918 – James MacGregor Burns, American historian, political scientist, and author (died 2014)
- 1918 – Sidney Gottlieb, American chemist and theorist (died 1999)
- 1918 – Larry Haines, American actor (died 2008)
- 1918 – Eddie Jefferson, American singer-songwriter (died 1979)
- 1920 – Norman Dewis, English test driver and engineer (died 2019)
- 1920 – Max Fatchen, Australian journalist and author (died 2012)
- 1920 – P. D. James, English author (died 2014)
- 1920 – Charlie Shavers, American trumpet player and composer (died 1971)
- 1920 – Elmar Tampõld, Estonian-Canadian architect (died 2013)
- 1921 – Richard Adler, American composer and producer (died 2012)
- 1921 – Hayden Carruth, American poet and critic (died 2008)
- 1921 – Marilyn Maxwell, American actress (died 1972)
- 1922 – John Eisenhower, American historian, general, and diplomat, 45th United States Ambassador to Belgium (died 2013)
- 1923 – Jean Hagen, American actress (died 1977)
- 1923 – Pope Shenouda III of Alexandria (died 2012)
- 1924 – Connie Converse, American musician and singer-songwriter (disappeared 1974)
- 1924 – Leon Uris, American soldier and author (died 2003)
- 1925 – Marv Levy, American-Canadian football player, coach, and manager
- 1925 – Lewis Rowland, American neurologist (died 2017)
- 1926 – Rona Anderson, Scottish actress (died 2013)
- 1926 – Tony Bennett, American singer and actor (died 2023)
- 1926 – Anthony Sampson, English journalist and author (died 2004)
- 1926 – Gordon Scott, American actor (died 2007)
- 1926 – Rushdy Abaza, Egyptian actor (died 1980)
- 1928 – Cécile Aubry, French actress, director, and screenwriter (died 2010)
- 1928 – Henning Moritzen, Danish actor (died 2012)
- 1930 – James Komack, American actor, director, producer, and screenwriter (died 1997)
- 1933 – Pat Crawford, Australian cricketer (died 2009)
- 1934 – Haystacks Calhoun, American wrestler and actor (died 1989)
- 1934 – Michael Chapman, English bassoon player (died 2005)
- 1934 – Jonas Savimbi, Angolan general, founded UNITA (died 2002)
- 1935 – John Erman, American actor, director, and producer (died 2021)
- 1935 – Georgy Shonin, Ukrainian-Russian general, pilot, and cosmonaut (died 1997)
- 1935 – Vic Vogel, Canadian pianist, composer, and bandleader (died 2019)
- 1936 – Jerry G. Bishop, American radio and television host (died 2013)
- 1936 – Edward Petherbridge, English actor
- 1937 – Steven Berkoff, English actor, director, and playwright
- 1937 – Roland Burris, American lawyer and politician, 39th Illinois Attorney General
- 1937 – Duncan Sharpe, Pakistani-Australian cricketer
- 1938 – Terry Wogan, Irish radio and television host (died 2016)
- 1939 – Jimmie Nicol, English drummer
- 1939 – Apoorva Sengupta, Indian general and cricketer (died 2013)
- 1940 – Lance Alworth, American football player
- 1940 – Martin Sheen, American actor and producer
- 1940 – James Tyler, American guitarist and songwriter (died 2010)
- 1941 – Juanita Helms, American politician (died 2009)
- 1941 – Beverly Lee, American singer
- 1941 – Martha Stewart, American businesswoman, publisher, and author, founded Martha Stewart Living Omnimedia
- 1943 – Béla Bollobás, Hungarian-English mathematician and academic
- 1943 – Princess Christina, Mrs. Magnuson of Sweden
- 1943 – Steven Millhauser, American novelist and short story writer
- 1944 – Morris Berman, American historian and social critic
- 1944 – Nino Bravo, Spanish singer (died 1973)
- 1945 – Eamon Dunphy, Irish footballer and journalist
- 1946 – Robert Ayling, English businessman
- 1946 – Jack Straw, English lawyer and politician, Shadow Deputy Prime Minister of the United Kingdom
- 1946 – John York, American bass player, songwriter, and producer
- 1947 – Ralph Wright, English footballer (died 2020)
- 1948 – Jean-Pierre Raffarin, French lawyer and politician, 166th Prime Minister of France
- 1949 – Philip Casnoff, American actor and director
- 1949 – B. B. Dickerson, American bass player and songwriter (died 2021)
- 1949 – Sue Slipman, English politician
- 1950 – Linda Howard, American author
- 1950 – John Landis, American actor, director, producer, and screenwriter
- 1950 – Jo Marie Payton, American actress and singer
- 1950 – Ernesto Samper, Colombian economist and politician, 29th President of Colombia
- 1951 – Marcel Dionne, Canadian ice hockey player
- 1951 – Jay North, American actor (died 2025)
- 1952 – Osvaldo Ardiles, Argentinian footballer and manager
- 1953 – Ian Bairnson, Scottish guitarist, songwriter and saxophonist (died 2023)
- 1953 – Marlene Dumas, South African painter
- 1954 – Michael Arthur, English physician and academic
- 1954 – Gary Peters, English footballer and manager
- 1956 – Kirk Brandon, English singer-songwriter and guitarist
- 1956 – Todd Christensen, American football player and sportscaster (died 2013)
- 1956 – Dave Cloud, American singer-songwriter and actor (died 2015)
- 1956 – Balwinder Sandhu, Indian cricketer and coach
- 1956 – Ian Crichton, Canadian guitarist
- 1957 – Bodo Rudwaleit, German footballer and manager
- 1957 – Kate Wilkinson, New Zealand lawyer and politician, 11th New Zealand Minister of Conservation
- 1958 – Lindsey Hilsum, English journalist and author
- 1958 – Ana Kokkinos, Australian director and screenwriter
- 1959 – Martin Atkins, English drummer and producer
- 1959 – Mike Gminski, American basketball player and sportscaster
- 1959 – John C. McGinley, American actor and producer
- 1959 – Koichi Tanaka, Japanese chemist and engineer, Nobel Prize laureate
- 1960 – Tim Mayotte, American tennis player and coach
- 1960 – Gopal Sharma, Indian cricketer
- 1961 – Molly Hagan, American actress
- 1961 – Nick Harvey, English politician, Minister of State for the Armed Forces
- 1961 – Lee Rocker, American bassist
- 1963 – Tasmin Archer, English pop singer
- 1963 – Frano Botica, New Zealand rugby player and coach
- 1963 – James Hetfield, American singer-songwriter and guitarist
- 1963 – David Knox, Australian rugby player
- 1963 – Ed Roland, American singer-songwriter, guitarist, and producer
- 1963 – Lisa Ann Walter, American actress, producer, and screenwriter
- 1963 – Isaiah Washington, American actor and producer
- 1964 – Lucky Dube, South African singer and keyboard player (died 2007)
- 1964 – Ralph Knibbs, British rugby union player
- 1964 – Nate McMillan, American basketball player and coach
- 1964 – Kevin Sumlin, American football player and coach
- 1964 – Abhisit Vejjajiva, English-Thai economist and politician, 27th Prime Minister of Thailand
- 1966 – Brent Butt, Canadian actor, producer, and screenwriter
- 1966 – Gizz Butt, English singer-songwriter and guitarist
- 1966 – Eric Esch, American wrestler, boxer, and mixed martial artist
- 1966 – Robert Laimer, Austrian politician
- 1967 – Mathieu Kassovitz, French actor, director, producer, and screenwriter
- 1967 – Skin, English singer and guitarist
- 1968 – Rod Beck, American baseball player (died 2007)
- 1969 – Doug Overton, American basketball player and coach
- 1970 – Stephen Carpenter, American guitarist and songwriter
- 1970 – Gina G, Australian singer-songwriter
- 1970 – Masahiro Sakurai, Japanese video game designer
- 1971 – Forbes Johnston, Scottish footballer (died 2007)
- 1971 – DJ Spinderella, American DJ, rapper, producer, and actress
- 1972 – Sandis Ozoliņš, Latvian ice hockey player and politician
- 1973 – Nikos Dabizas, Greek footballer
- 1973 – Michael Ealy, American actor
- 1975 – Wael Gomaa, Egyptian footballer
- 1975 – Argyro Strataki, Greek heptathlete
- 1976 – Troy Glaus, American baseball player
- 1977 – Tom Brady, American football player
- 1977 – Óscar Pereiro, Spanish cyclist and footballer
- 1978 – Joi Chua, Singaporean singer-songwriter and actress
- 1978 – Mariusz Jop, Polish footballer
- 1978 – Dimitrios Zografakis, Greek footballer
- 1979 – Evangeline Lilly, Canadian actress
- 1980 – Nadia Ali, Libyan-American singer-songwriter
- 1980 – Dominic Moore, Canadian ice hockey player
- 1980 – Hannah Simone, Canadian television host and actress
- 1981 – Fikirte Addis, Ethiopian fashion designer
- 1981 – Pablo Ibáñez, Spanish footballer
- 1982 – Kaspar Kokk, Estonian skier
- 1982 – Jesse Lumsden, Canadian bobsledder and football player
- 1983 – Ryan Carter, American ice hockey player
- 1984 – Yasin Avcı, Turkish footballer
- 1984 – Sunil Chhetri, Indian footballer
- 1984 – Ryan Lochte, American swimmer
- 1985 – Georgina Haig, Australian actress
- 1985 – Brent Kutzle, American bass player and producer
- 1985 – Ats Purje, Estonian footballer
- 1985 – Sonny Bill Williams, New Zealand rugby player and boxer
- 1986 – Charlotte Casiraghi, Monégasque journalist, co-founded Ever Manifesto
- 1986 – Darya Domracheva, Belarusian biathlete
- 1987 – Kim Hyung-jun, South Korean singer and dancer
- 1989 – Jules Bianchi, French racing driver (died 2015)
- 1989 – Tyrod Taylor, American football player
- 1989 – Nick Viergever, Dutch footballer
- 1990 – Jourdan Dunn, English model
- 1990 – Kang Min-kyung, South Korean singer
- 1992 – Gamze Bulut, Turkish runner
- 1992 – Gesa Felicitas Krause, German runner
- 1992 – Karlie Kloss, American fashion model
- 1994 – Kwon Alexander, American football player
- 1994 – Esther Earl, American author, vlogger, and online personality (died 2010)
- 1994 – Younghoe Koo, South Korean-born American football player
- 1995 – Zac Gallen, American baseball player
- 1995 – Victoria Kan, Russian tennis player
- 1996 – Alec Bohm, American baseball player
- 1996 – Bokondji Imama, Canadian ice hockey player
- 1996 – Derwin James, American football player
- 1997 – Luis Robert Jr., Cuban baseball player
- 1999 – Zach Wilson, American football player
- 1999 – Brahim Díaz, Spanish-Moroccan footballer
- 1999 – Yoo Yeon-jung, South Korean singer

== Deaths ==
=== Pre-1600 ===
- 908 – Burchard, duke of Thuringia
- 908 – Egino, duke of Thuringia
- 908 – Rudolf I, bishop of Würzburg
- 925 – Cao, Chinese empress dowager
- 979 – Thietmar, margrave of Meissen
- 1003 – At-Ta'i, Abbasid caliph (born 929)
- 1355 – Bartholomew de Burghersh, 1st Baron Burghersh, English nobleman
- 1460 – James II, king of Scotland (born 1430)
- 1527 – Scaramuccia Trivulzio, Italian cardinal
- 1530 – Francesco Ferruccio, Italian captain (born 1489)
- 1546 – Antonio da Sangallo the Younger, Italian architect, designed the Apostolic Palace (born 1484)
- 1546 – Étienne Dolet, French scholar and translator (born 1509)

=== 1601–1900 ===
- 1604 – Bernardino de Mendoza, Spanish commander and diplomat (born 1540)
- 1621 – Guillaume du Vair, French lawyer and author (born 1556)
- 1712 – Joshua Barnes, English historian and scholar (born 1654)
- 1720 – Anthonie Heinsius, Dutch politician (born 1641)
- 1721 – Grinling Gibbons, Dutch-English sculptor and woodcarver (born 1648)
- 1761 – Johann Matthias Gesner, German scholar and academic (born 1691)
- 1773 – Stanisław Konarski, Polish poet and playwright (born 1700)
- 1780 – Étienne Bonnot de Condillac, French epistemologist and philosopher (born 1715)
- 1792 – Richard Arkwright, English engineer and businessman (born 1732)
- 1797 – Jeffery Amherst, 1st Baron Amherst, English field marshal and politician, Colonial Governor of Virginia (born 1717)
- 1805 – Christopher Anstey, English author and poet (born 1724)
- 1835 – Wenzel Müller, Austrian composer and conductor (born 1767)
- 1839 – Dorothea von Schlegel, German author and translator (born 1763)
- 1857 – Eugène Sue, French author and politician (born 1804)
- 1866 – Gábor Klauzál, Hungarian politician, Hungarian Minister of Agriculture (born 1804)
- 1867 – August Böckh, German historian and scholar (born 1785)
- 1877 – William B. Ogden, American businessman and politician, 1st Mayor of Chicago (born 1805)
- 1879 – Joseph Severn, English painter (born 1793)
- 1894 – George Inness, American painter (born 1825)

=== 1901–present ===
- 1913 – William Lyne, Australian politician, 13th Premier of New South Wales (born 1844)
- 1916 – Roger Casement, executed Irish poet and activist (born 1864)
- 1917 – Ferdinand Georg Frobenius, German mathematician and academic (born 1849)
- 1920 – Peeter Süda, Estonian organist and composer (born 1883)
- 1922 – Ture Malmgren, Swedish journalist and politician (born 1851)
- 1924 – Joseph Conrad, British novelist (born 1857)
- 1925 – William Bruce, Australian cricketer (born 1864)
- 1929 – Emile Berliner, German-American inventor and businessman, invented the phonograph (born 1851)
- 1929 – Thorstein Veblen, American economist and sociologist (born 1857)
- 1936 – Konstantin Konik, Estonian surgeon and politician, 19th Estonian Minister of Education (born 1873)
- 1942 – Richard Willstätter, German-Swiss chemist and academic, Nobel Prize laureate (born 1872)
- 1943 – Frumka Płotnicka, Polish resistance fighter during World War II (born 1914)
- 1949 – Ignotus, Hungarian poet and author (born 1869)
- 1954 – Colette, French novelist and journalist (born 1873)
- 1958 – Peter Collins, English race car driver (born 1931)
- 1959 – Herb Byrne, Australian footballer (born 1887)
- 1961 – Hilda Rix Nicholas, Australian artist (born 1884)
- 1963 – Signe Salén, Swedish doctor (born 1871)
- 1964 – Flannery O'Connor, American short story writer and novelist (born 1925)
- 1966 – Lenny Bruce, American comedian, actor, and screenwriter (born 1925)
- 1968 – Konstantin Rokossovsky, Marshal of the Soviet Union during World War II (born 1896)
- 1969 – Alexander Mair, Australian politician, 26th Premier of New South Wales (born 1889)
- 1972 – Giannis Papaioannou, Turkish-Greek composer (born 1913)
- 1973 – Richard Marshall, American general (born 1895)
- 1974 – Edgar Johan Kuusik, Estonian architect and interior designer (born 1888)
- 1975 – Andreas Embirikos, Greek poet and photographer (born 1901)
- 1977 – Makarios III, Cypriot archbishop and politician, 1st President of the Republic of Cyprus (born 1913)
- 1977 – Alfred Lunt, American actor and director (born 1892)
- 1979 – Bertil Ohlin, Swedish economist and politician, Nobel Prize laureate (born 1899)
- 1979 – Angelos Terzakis, Greek author and playwright (born 1907)
- 1983 – Carolyn Jones, American actress (born 1930)
- 1992 – Wang Hongwen, Chinese labor activist and politician, member of the Gang of Four (born 1935)
- 1995 – Ida Lupino, English-American actress and director (born 1918)
- 1995 – Edward Whittemore, American soldier and author (born 1933)
- 1996 – Jørgen Garde, Danish admiral (born 1939)
- 1997 – Pietro Rizzuto, Italian-Canadian lawyer and politician (born 1934)
- 1998 – Alfred Schnittke, Russian composer and journalist (born 1934)
- 1999 – Rod Ansell, Australian hunter (born 1953)
- 1999 – Byron Farwell, American historian and author (born 1921)
- 2000 – Joann Lõssov, Estonian basketball player and coach (born 1921)
- 2001 – Christopher Hewett, English actor and director (born 1922)
- 2003 – Roger Voudouris, American singer-songwriter and guitarist (born 1954)
- 2004 – Henri Cartier-Bresson, French photographer and painter (born 1908)
- 2005 – Françoise d'Eaubonne, French author and poet (born 1920)
- 2006 – Arthur Lee, American singer-songwriter, guitarist, and producer (born 1945)
- 2006 – Elisabeth Schwarzkopf, German-English soprano and actress (born 1915)
- 2007 – John Gardner, English author (born 1926)
- 2007 – Peter Thorup, Danish singer-songwriter, guitarist, and producer (born 1948)
- 2008 – Skip Caray, American sportscaster (born 1939)
- 2008 – Erik Darling, American singer-songwriter (born 1933)
- 2008 – Aleksandr Solzhenitsyn, Russian novelist, dramatist and historian, Nobel Prize laureate (born 1918)
- 2009 – Nikolaos Makarezos, Greek soldier and politician, Deputy Prime Minister of Greece (born 1919)
- 2010 – Bobby Hebb, American singer-songwriter (born 1938)
- 2011 – William Sleator, American author (born 1945)
- 2011 – Bubba Smith, American football player and actor (born 1945)
- 2012 – Frank Evans, American baseball player, coach, and manager (born 1921)
- 2012 – Martin Fleischmann, Czech-English chemist and academic (born 1927)
- 2012 – Paul McCracken, American economist and academic (born 1915)
- 2012 – John Pritchard, American basketball player (born 1927)
- 2012 – George Shanard, American politician and agribusinessman (born 1926)
- 2013 – John Coombs, English-Monegasque race car driver and businessman (born 1922)
- 2013 – Jack English Hightower, American lawyer and politician (born 1926)
- 2013 – Jack Hynes, Scottish-American soccer player and manager (born 1920)
- 2014 – Miangul Aurangzeb, Pakistani captain and politician, 19th Governor of Khyber Pakhtunkhwa (born 1928)
- 2014 – Edward Clancy, Australian cardinal (born 1923)
- 2014 – Dorothy Salisbury Davis, American author (born 1916)
- 2014 – Kenny Drew, Jr., American pianist and composer (born 1958)
- 2014 – Lydia Yu-Jose, Filipino political scientist and academic (born 1944)
- 2015 – Robert Conquest, English-American historian, poet, and academic (born 1917)
- 2015 – Mel Farr, American football player and businessman (born 1944)
- 2015 – Coleen Gray, American actress (born 1922)
- 2015 – Margot Loyola, Chilean singer-songwriter and guitarist (born 1918)
- 2015 – Johanna Quandt, German businesswoman (born 1926)
- 2015 – Jef Murray, American artist and author (born 1960)
- 2020 – John Hume, Northern Irish politician (born 1937)
- 2022 – Jackie Walorski, American politician (born 1963)
- 2023 – Mark Margolis, American actor (born 1939)
- 2023 – Bram Moolenaar, Dutch software engineer (born 1961)
- 2024 – Yamini Krishnamurthy, Indian dancer (born 1940)
- 2025 – Loni Anderson, American actress (born 1945)

== Holidays and observances ==
- Anniversary of the Killing of Pidjiguiti (Guinea-Bissau)
- Armed Forces Day (Equatorial Guinea)
- Christian feast day:
  - Blessed Augustin Kažotić
  - George Freeman Bragg, W. E. B. Du Bois (Episcopal Church)
  - Lydia of Thyatira
  - Myrrhbearers (Lutheran Church)
  - Nicodemus
  - Olaf II of Norway (Translation of the relic)
  - Stephen (Discovery of the relic)
  - Waltheof of Melrose
  - August 3 (Eastern Orthodox liturgics)
- Flag Day (Venezuela)
- Independence Day, celebrates the independence of Niger from France in 1960.
  - Arbor Day (Niger)
- National Guard Day (Venezuela)
