= SWO =

SWO or Swo may refer to:

== Places ==
- SeaWorld Orlando, a theme park in Florida, US
- Southwestern Ontario, a region in Canada

== Science and technology ==
- Strict weak ordering, in mathematics

== Transport ==
- Snowdown railway station, Kent, England (National Rail station code: SWO)
- Stillwater Regional Airport (IATA and FAA LID code: SWO)

== Other uses ==
- Socialist Workers Organization (disambiguation)
- Surface warfare officer
- Swo, a language of Cameroon
- Staff Weather Officer, United States Air Force personnel
- Scene World Magazine, a disk magazine for the Commodore 64 computer
