= Union for People's Democracy =

Political movement in Senegal

- General Secretary: Hamédine Racine Guissé
- Founded: 1970s
- Dissolved: 1991
- Merged into: And-Jëf/African Party for Democracy and Socialism
- Ideology: Communism; Marxism-Leninism; Hoxhaism

Union for People's Democracy (French: Union pour la Démocratie Populaire) was an underground Hoxhaist political movement in Senegal that emerged in the 1970s, formed as a continuation of the Movement of Young Marxist-Leninists. Hamédine Racine Guissé was the general secretary of the organization. UDP published Voix du Peuple. On July 20, 1981 UDP was legalized. In 1983, UDP supported Mamadou Dia's presidential campaign. The party recognized the Albanian Party of Labor as the leader of the international communist movement.

In 1991 UDP merged into And-Jëf/African Party for Democracy and Socialism.
