= Senate (Senegal) =

Upper house of Parliament of Senegal (1999–2001, 2007–2012)

The Senate (French: Sénat) was the upper house of the Parliament of Senegal from 1999 to 2001 and from 2007 to 2012.

== History and elections ==
The Senate was initially established during the presidency of Abdou Diouf in 1999, but in 2001, after Abdoulaye Wade won the previous year's presidential election, it was abolished with the introduction of a new constitution. It was established again in 2007 with 100 seats: 65 appointed by the president and 35 elected by about 12,000 deputies and local councillors. The ruling Senegalese Democratic Party (PDS) won 34 of the 35 elected seats in the senatorial election held on August 19, 2007; one seat, for Vélingara Department, was won by And-Jëf/African Party for Democracy and Socialism (AJ/PADS). Five other groups participated but did not win seats. Most of the main opposition parties boycotted the senatorial election, as they did the June 2007 National Assembly election.

Following the election, the Senate was installed on September 26, 2007, and Pape Diop was elected as its President on October 3.

A new Senate election was planned to be held in September 2012, but shortly beforehand, in late August 2012, President Macky Sall announced plans to abolish the Senate and return to a unicameral chamber. In the midst of serious flooding, he said that scrapping the Senate would save money that would then be directed toward flood prevention: "the relief of the suffering of the people is more important than the Senate, for us to stop the floods that cyclically affect our country".

== See also ==
- List of presidents of the Senate of Senegal
