= Jerry Cornes =

English runner, colonial officer, and schoolmaster (1910–2001)

John Frederick Cornes
Personal information
- Born: 23 March 1910 Darjeeling, British India
- Died: 19 June 2001 (aged 91)
- Education: Clifton College; Corpus Christi College, Oxford
- Occupation: Schoolteacher
- Spouse: Rachael Addis (m. 1937)
- Relatives: Charles Stewart Addis (father-in-law); Robina Addis (sister-in-law); John Addis (brother-in-law); William Addis (brother-in-law)

Sport
- Club: University of Oxford AC; Achilles Club
Medal record
Men's athletics
Olympic Games
Representing Great Britain
| Silver medal – second place | 1932 Los Angeles | 1500 metres |
British Empire Games
Representing England
| Bronze medal – third place | 1930 Hamilton | 1 mile |
| Bronze medal – third place | 1934 London | 1 mile |

John Frederick Cornes also known as Jerry Cornes (23 March 1910 – 19 June 2001) was an English middle distance runner, colonial officer, and schoolmaster. He was born in Darjeeling, British India.

== Early life ==
The son of a judge in the Indian Civil Service, Cornes was educated at Clifton College and won a scholarship to Corpus Christi College, Oxford, where he read history. He stayed at Oxford for an extra year, studying one of the languages of Nigeria and learning how to work in the colonies. He left Oxford in 1932, when he competed in the Olympics at Los Angeles.

== Career ==
After the 1932 Olympic Games, Cornes was posted to Nigeria as a civil servant. He stayed there for five years, during which time he was given leave to attend the 1936 Games in Berlin. He only decided to go for the '36 Olympics a year before, so he did no intensive training in between, but during that time he raced a local Nigerian around the walls of Katsima and lost.

In 1937, Cornes returned from Nigeria and on 12 June he married Rachael Addis in Frant, Sussex. Their marriage was extremely happy. In 1997, they celebrated their diamond wedding anniversary.

Also in 1937, he went to work for the civil service in Palestine, as assistant district officer of Ramallah, in Judea. He also worked in Hebron and Safad. His three elder sons, Nick, Colin and John were born in Palestine. He was working at the King David Hotel at the time of the King David Hotel bombing. He was curious when he heard a small explosive blast in the street outside the hotel, which had been set off by terrorists to keep passers-by away from the area. He went outside to investigate, and while he was outside a bomb inside the hotel was detonated, killing everyone on his floor.

Cornes left Palestine in 1947. Returning home, he worked for the Colonial Office and taught colonial service students at Oxford until 1953. His youngest son, Andrew, was born during this period. In 1953, he came into an inheritance and bought West Downs School, Winchester, where he taught history, Religious Studies and Latin, as well as being headmaster. He retired in 1988 and the school was closed down.

== Athlete ==
Cornes first became interested in running at Clifton, where he won the seven-mile cross-country 'Long Pen Pole' race, as his father had done twice before him. When the Achilles Club from Oxford and Cambridge came for a match against Clifton, he beat, on handicap, Douglas Lowe, who was an Olympic champion. At Oxford, he won the Freshman cross-country race.

Shortly before the 1930 British Empire Games in Canada, Cornes finished second behind Reg Thomas in the 1 mile event at the 1930 AAA Championships. At the 1930 British Empire Games he won the bronze medal in the 1 mile event. Four years later at the 1934 Empire Games he won again the bronze medal in the 1 mile competition.

Cornes became the national 1 mile champion after winning the British AAA Championships title at the 1932 AAA Championships.

Shortly afterwards he was selected to represent Great Britain at the 1932 Olympic Games in Los Angeles, in the 1500 metres, where he won the silver medal. His time was 3 minutes 52 seconds. He then competed in the 1936 Summer Olympics in Berlin, gaining sixth place in the 1500 metres event but running his personal best time of 3 minutes 51.4 seconds. The race was exceptional because the first two runners broke World Records and the first five, Olympic Records.
