= Yasin Avcı =

Yasin Avcı may refer to:

- Yasin Avcı (footballer born 1983), Turkish footballer
- Yasin Avcı (footballer born 1984), Turkish footballer
