= Seynabou Male Cissé =

Senegalese human rights activist (born 1952)

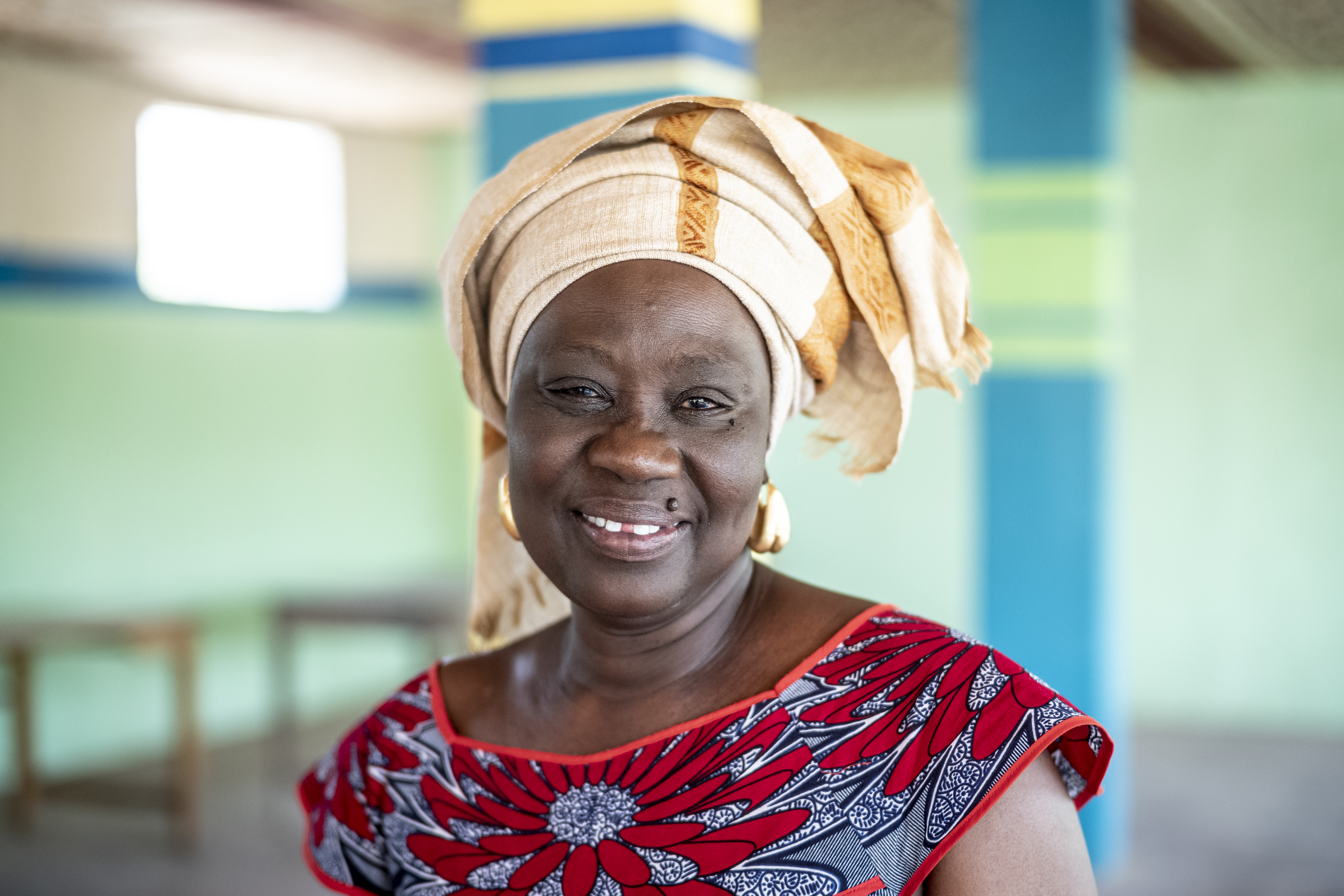
- Cissé in 2020
- Born: 1952 (age 73–74); Gandiaye, Senegal, French West Africa
- Citizenship: Senegal
- Occupations: Human rights activist Teacher
- Years active: 1974–present
- Organization(s): Usoforal; Platforme des Femmes pour la Paix en Casamance
- Known for: Campaigning for peace during the Casamance conflict
- Political party: And-Jëf (until 2003)

Seynabou Male Cissé (born 1952) is a Senegalese human rights activist and teacher. Born and raised in Kaolack, she later moved to Casamance, where she worked as a geography teacher for 25 years. Following the outbreak of the Casamance conflict in 1982, Cissé began calling for peace, in addition to defending the rights of women impacted by the conflict.

== Biography ==
=== Early years and education ===
Cissé was born in 1952 in Gandiaye, Senegal, which was at that time a constituent country of French West Africa. She was raised in a multi-ethnic family; her father was from the north of the country, while her mother was from central Senegal. As a student at university, Cissé was a founding member of And-Jëf/Revolutionary Movement for New Democracy, a Marxist–Leninist political party established in 1974, and played an active role in its student movement. After obtaining bachelor's and master's degrees in geography, and studying at a teacher training college in Thiès, Cissé moved to the city of Ziguinchor in the Casamance region of Senegal, where she married Nouha Cissé, an And-Jëf secretary general. Cissé worked as a secondary school teacher in Ziguinchor for 25 years.

During her early years in Casamance, Cissé campaigned for greater equality and rights for women living in Casamance, particularly in rural villages, where she did outreach work challenging patriarchal ideas on the roles of women, as well as raising awareness about managing health conditions such as malaria and diarrhoea. In addition to teaching at a state secondary school, she also worked for an And-Jëf-funded school that aimed to get girls and women who had dropped out of school back into education.

=== Casamance conflict and subsequent activism ===
In 1982, the Casamance conflict broke out between the government of Senegal and the Movement of Democratic Forces of Casamance, which called for the independence of Casamance from the rest of the country. During the main conflict, which continued until 2014, women, and particularly women from rural areas, experienced displacement, sexual assault and kidnapping, as well as financial difficulties caused by the loss of male relatives. Cissé began campaigning for female victims of the conflict, as well as raising awareness of their experiences.

During the 1990s, when peace talks began between both factions in Banjul, the Gambia, Cissé made efforts to ensure that women were included as delegates in the peace process. In 1999, she established the Regional Committee of Women's Solidarity for Peace in Casamance (French: Comité Régional de Solidarité des Femmes pour la Paix en Casamance), also known as Usoforal (Jola for "let's join hands"), which advocated for the "traditional" role of women as peacemakers in ending the Casamance conflict, as well as stressing the need for them to be part of peace talks and rebuilding efforts. In addition to its role in the peace process, Usoforal loaned money and farming equipment to help women support themselves and their families, in addition to working to improve conditions to allow displaced peoples to return to their homes. While Usoforal initially had links to And-Jëf, Cissé left the party in 2003 after it joined the government coalition.

In 2010, Cissé established the Platforme des Femmes pour la Paix en Casamance, a coalition of 210 civil society organisations with over 40, 000 activists trying to attain "peace and justice" in Casamance. The following year, she organised a peace vigil of 5000 women to raise awareness of women killed during recent skirmishes between government and rebel forces. Cissé also spoke at the World Social Forum in Dakar, calling for women to be part of the Casamance peace process, citing United Nations Security Council Resolution 1325, which supported the right of women to partake in reconstruction efforts in countries impacted by conflict. When the President of Senegal, Macky Sall, agreed to meet with Casamance rebels, he publicly stated he would include Cissé and the PFPC in planned peace talks.

== Recognition ==
In 2013, Cissé received the Women's Creativity in Rural Life Award from the Women's World Summit Foundation for her "courageous and creative" work in the rural women's movement.

In 2023, she received the Ignacio Ellacuría Award for Development Cooperation from the Basque Government for her work in the field of peace and women's rights. It cited her "her commitment to creating a more just and equitable society in Senegal and her dedication to building peace through dialogue and conflict mediation, with the active participation of women and a constant defence of equality and respect for their rights", and stated the award was also in recognition of the work of other female peace activists across Africa.
