= Convention of Democrats and Patriots =

Political party in Senegal

The Convention of Democrats and Patriots (Convention des Démocrates et des Patriotes, CDP/Garab-gi) was a political party in Senegal that was led by Iba Der Thiam.

The party was founded by Thiam in June 1992. Its nickname, "Garab-gi", is Wolof for medicine, metaphorically reflecting a desire to restore the health of democracy in Senegal. The group was part of the Let Us Unite League (Japoo Liggueyal Senegal), which held three seats in the National Assembly following the February 1993 parliamentary election, along with And-Jëf/African Party for Democracy and Socialism and the National Democratic Rally. Thiam ran in the 2000 Senegalese presidential election, and after receiving 1.21% of the popular vote (fifth place) in the first round, he backed opposition leader Abdoulaye Wade in the second round. In the parliamentary election held on 29 April 2001, the party was part of the Sopi Coalition, an alliance of parties that included the Senegalese Democratic Party (PDS) of President Wade; the coalition together won 49.6% of the popular vote and 89 out of 120 seats.

The party subsequently merged with the PDS at a congress on May 7, 2005.
