= Ralph Leatham =

Royal Navy Admiral (1888-1954)

Admiral Sir Ralph Leatham KCB
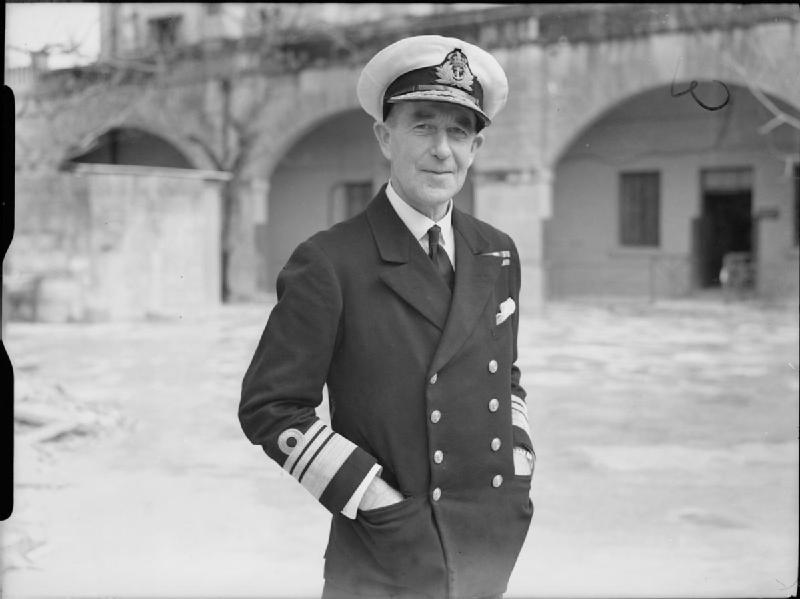
- Leatham on his appointment as Vice Admiral Malta

Governor of Bermuda
- In office 1945 – May 1946
- Monarch: George VI
- Preceded by: William Addis
- Succeeded by: Alexander Hood

Personal details
- Born: 3 March 1888 Hemsworth, West Yorkshire
- Died: 10 March 1954 (aged 66)
- Spouse: Enid Birks (m. 1910)
- Children: 2
- Military career
- Allegiance: United Kingdom
- Branch: Royal Navy
- Service years: 1900–1946
- Rank: Admiral
- Commands: HMS Yarmouth; HMS Durban; HMS Ramillies; HMS Valiant; 1st Battle Squadron; East Indies Station; FO-in-Charge, Malta & Malta Dockyard; Levant Station; Plymouth Station
- Conflicts: World War I World War II
- Awards: Knight Commander of the Order of the Bath

Admiral Sir Ralph Leatham, KCB (3 March 1888 – 10 March 1954) was a Royal Navy officer who served as Commander-in-Chief, Plymouth during World War II.

== Naval career ==
Leatham joined the Royal Navy in 1900 as a cadet on the training ship Britannia. He served on various ships during World War I. After the War he went on to command HMS Yarmouth, HMS Durban, HMS Ramillies and HMS Valiant. He was appointed Commander of the 1st Battle Squadron on 14 June 1938 holding that post until February 1939.

He served in World War II as Commander-in-Chief, East Indies Station from 12 April 1939 until 16 July 1941. He was next appointed as Admiral Superintendent Malta Dockyard and Flag Officer in Charge, Malta from January 1942 taking part in actions against the Italian Navy until December 1942. He became Deputy Governor of Malta in 1943 and was briefly temporary Commander-in-Chief, Levant before becoming Commander-in-Chief, Plymouth later in 1943. He retired in 1946.

In retirement he became Governor of Bermuda.

== Family ==
In 1910 he married Enid Birks; they had one son and one daughter.

Military offices
| Preceded by Sir James Somerville | Commander-in-Chief, East Indies Station; 1939–1941 | Succeeded by Sir Geoffrey Arbuthnot |
| Preceded by Sir Wilbraham Ford | Flag Officer, Malta; 1941–1942 | Succeeded by Sir Stuart Bonham Carter |
| Preceded by Sir Charles Forbes | Commander-in-Chief, Plymouth; 1943–1945 | Succeeded by Sir Henry Pridham-Wippell |
Government offices
| Preceded by Lord Burghley | Governor of Bermuda; 1946–1949 | Succeeded by Sir Alexander Hood |
