= And-Jëf =

And-Jëf may refer to two different Senegalese political parties:

- And-Jëf/African Party for Democracy and Socialism, an active socialist political party in Senegal
- And-Jëf/Revolutionary Movement for New Democracy, a defunct Marxist-Leninist political party in Senegal
