= Initiative Committee for Permanent Revolutionary Action =

Political group in Senegal

- Abbreviation: CIARP
- Dissolved: 1971
- Ideology: Marxism-Leninism
- Political position: Left-wing

Initiative Committee for Permanent Revolutionary Action (in French: Comité d'Initiative pour une Action Révolutionnaire Permanente) was a radical Marxist-Leninist group in Senegal. CIARP was founded by the Blondin Diop brothers following a split in the Movement of Young Marxist-Leninists.

CIARP was dismantled by Senegalese police in July 1971. Omar Blondin Diop was sentenced to three years imprisonment. He died in 1973 during torture at the prison of Gorée Island.
