= 1993 Senegalese presidential election =

- 21 February 1993
- Turnout: 51.46% (▼7.31pp)
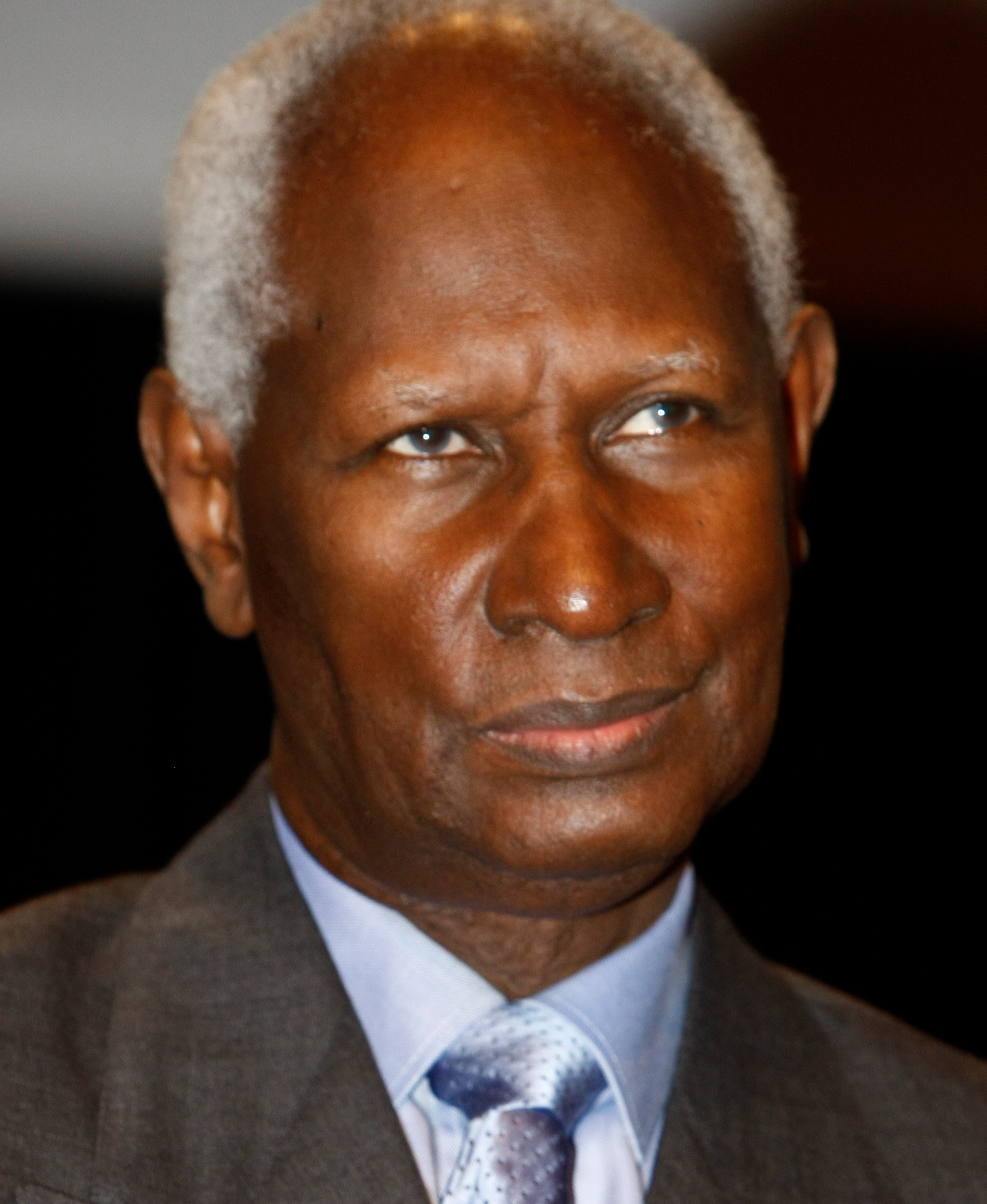

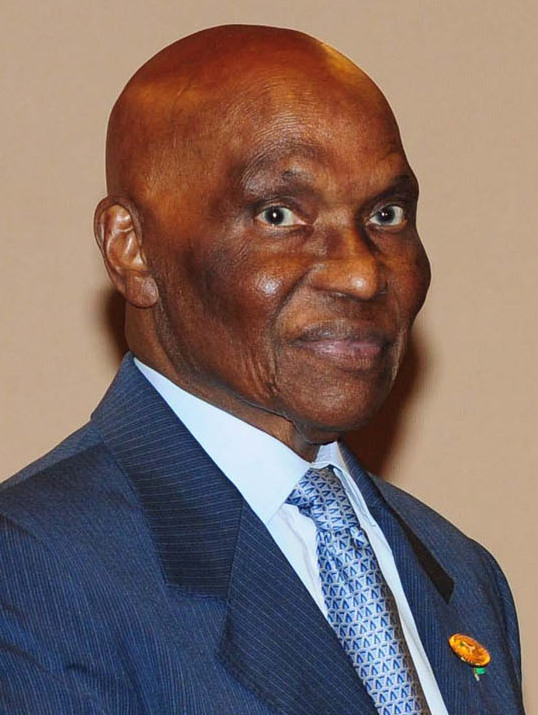
Candidate	Abdou Diouf	Abdoulaye Wade
Party	PS	PDS
Popular vote	757,311	415,295
Percentage	58.40%	32.03%
President before election
Abdou Diouf
PS
Elected President
Abdou Diouf
PS

Presidential elections were held in Senegal on 21 February 1993. Incumbent president Abdou Diouf of the Socialist Party defeated seven other candidates, receiving 58% of the vote. Voter turnout was 51%.

== Results ==
Candidate	Party	Votes	%
Abdou Diouf	Socialist Party	757,311	58.40
Abdoulaye Wade	Senegalese Democratic Party	415,295	32.03
Landing Savané	And-Jëf/African Party for Democracy and Socialism	37,787	2.91
Abdoulaye Bathily	Democratic League/Movement for the Labour Party	31,279	2.41
Iba Der Thiam	Convention of Democrats and Patriots	20,840	1.61
Madior Diouf	National Democratic Rally	12,635	0.97
Mamadou Lô	Independent	11,058	0.85
Babacar Niang	Party for the Liberation of the People	10,450	0.81
Total		1,296,655	100.00
Valid votes		1,296,655	98.82
Invalid/blank votes		15,499	1.18
Total votes		1,312,154	100.00
Registered voters/turnout		2,549,699	51.46
Source: Direction Générale des Élections
