= List of presidents of the Senate of Senegal =

President of the Senate of Senegal
- Coat of arms

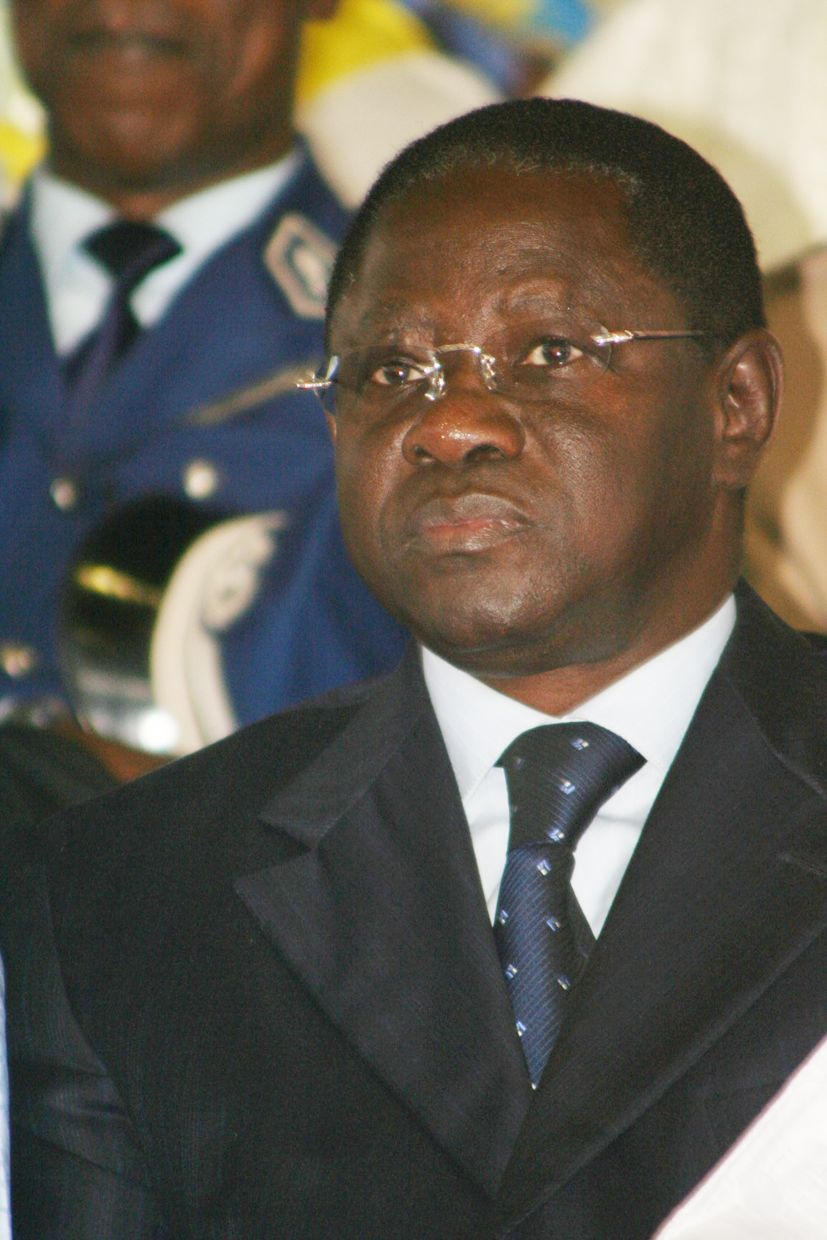
- Pape Diop
- Formation: 24 January 1999; 3 October 2007
- First holder: Abdoulaye Diack
- Final holder: Pape Diop
- Abolished: 7 January 2001; 19 September 2012
- Succession: None

List of presidents of the Senate of Senegal.

Below is a list of office-holders:

#	Portrait	Name	Term of office		Party
1		Abdoulaye Diack	24 January 1999	7 January 2001	Socialist Party of Senegal
Post abolished (7 January 2001–3 October 2007)
2		Pape Diop	3 October 2007	19 September 2012	Senegalese Democratic Party
Post abolished (19 September 2012–Present)

== See also ==
- Senate (Senegal)
