= Gandiaye =

- Town and commune
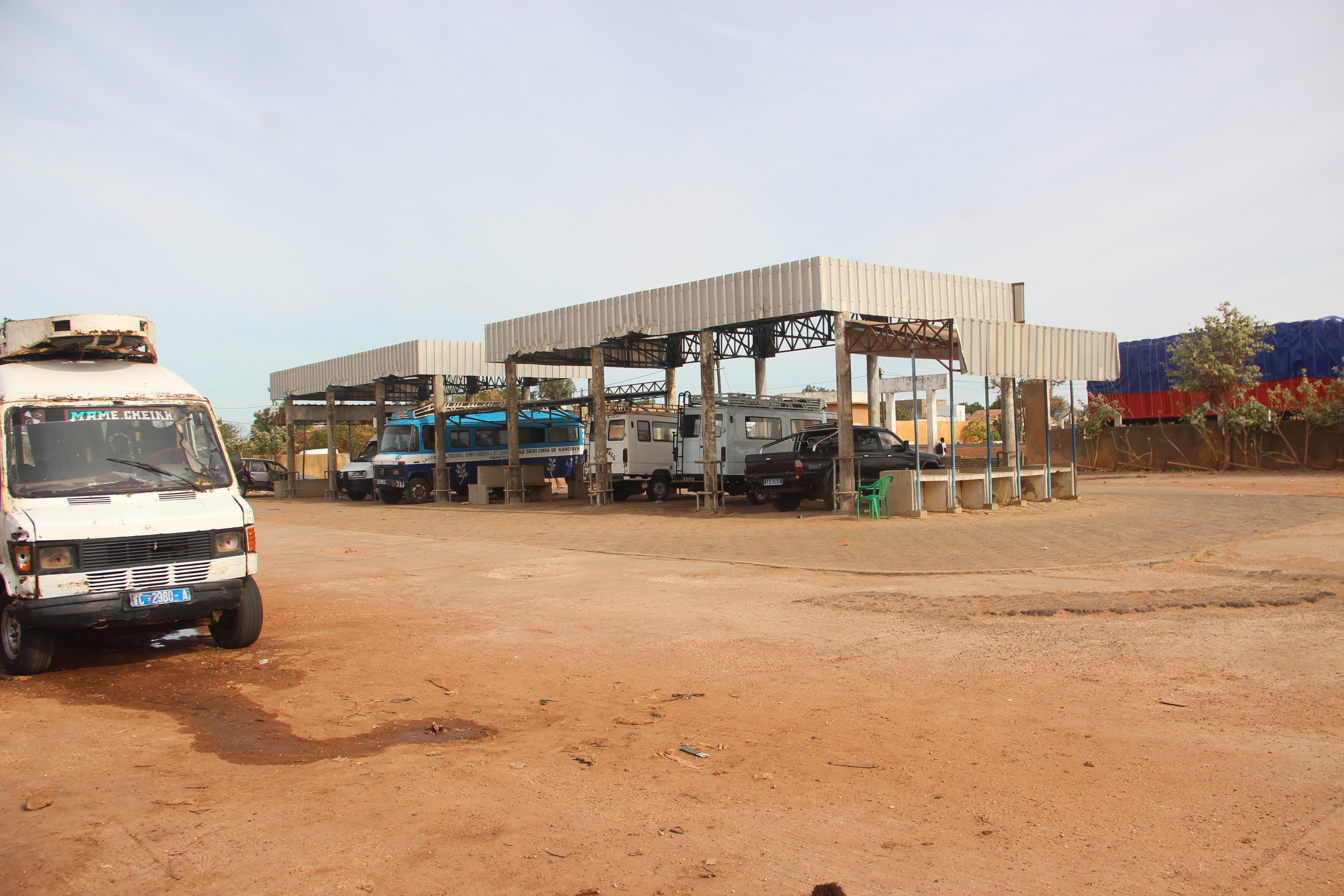
- Bus station in Gandiaye

- Location within Senegal
- Coordinates: 14.24340°N 16.27313°W
- Country: Senegal
- Region: Kaolack Region
- Department: Kaolack Department

Area
  - Town and commune: 3.924 km^{2} (1.515 sq mi)

Population (2023 census)
  - Town and commune: 18,239
  - Density: 4,648/km^{2} (12,040/sq mi)

The town and urban commune of Gandiaye in the Department of Kaolack, central Senegal, lies along National Route 1 about 24 kilometers from Kaolack. It had a population of 18,239 (2023 census) consisting of the Serer, Wolof, Fula, Bambara and Jola) ethnic groups.

The rural towns of Thiomby, le Dya, and Ndiebel are located in the surrounding rural commune of Thiomby. The economy is mainly agricultural, marketing to highway traffic. Outsiders come to fish in the Saloum River tributaries.

As of 2002 the Mayor of Gandiaye was Dr. El Hadji Gueye. The area is Muslim, Catholic and adherents to Serer religion. The town has a Muslim and a Catholic cemetery.

== Notable residents ==
- Seynabou Male Cissé (born 1952), teacher and activist.
