= Iba Der Thiam =

Senegalese writer, historian, and politician (1937–2020)

First Vice-President of the National Assembly of Senegal
- In office 2001–2012
- President: Youssou Diagne

Minister of Education
- In office 1983–1988
- President: Abdou Diouf

Personal details
- Born: 26 February 1937 Kaffrine, French West Africa
- Died: 31 October 2020 (aged 83) Dakar, Senegal
- Party: Convention of Democrats and Patriots (CDP) (1992–2005); Senegalese Democratic Party (PDS)
- Occupation: Writer, historian, politician

Iba Der Thiam, also known as I. D. Thiam (26 February 1937 – 31 October 2020), was a Senegalese writer, historian, and politician. He served in the government of Senegal as Minister of Education from 1983 to 1988; later, he was First Vice-President of the National Assembly of Senegal from 2001 to 2012.

== Life and career ==
Thiam was born in Kaffrine on 26 February 1937. Thiam became an Associate Professor of History at the University of Dakar in October 1974, and was one of the participants in the General History of Africa project by the UNESCO. A union leader for 20 years he was imprisoned under President Léopold Sédar Senghor for attempting to organize the country's intellectuals.

Under President Abdou Diouf, he served in the government as Minister of National Education from 1983 to 1988. In September 1987, he founded the "Abdoo nu dooy" movement to campaign for Diouf's re-election in the February 1988 presidential election. He was dismissed from the government after the 1988 election and founded the Convention of Democrats and Patriots (CDP/Garab-gi) in June 1992.

Thiam was the CDP's candidate in the February 1993 presidential election. He was also elected to the National Assembly in 1993; he was re-elected as the CDP's only deputy in 1998. In late August 1999, Thiam was again designated as the CDP's candidate for the 2000 presidential election. He received 1.21% of the popular vote in the first round of the election, held on 27 February 2000, and he said on 1 March that Diouf's failure to win a majority in the first round was the result of popular disillusionment associated with a pay rise for deputies that was announced during the campaign. He backed opposition leader Abdoulaye Wade in the second round; Wade won the election. Thiam was re-elected to the National Assembly through national list proportional representation as a candidate of the pro-Wade Sopi Coalition in the 2001 parliamentary election, and during Wade's presidency he served as First Vice-President of the National Assembly. The CDP/Garab-gi merged with Wade's Senegalese Democratic Party (PDS) in May 2005.

Thiam was re-elected to the National Assembly as a candidate of the Sopi Coalition in the June 2007 parliamentary election, winning his seat through national list proportional representation. Following the election, on 20 June 2007 he was re-elected as First Vice-President of the National Assembly. It was reported that he declined an offer from President Wade to become a Minister of State, preferring to remain in his National Assembly post. As of 2007, Thiam was the Coordinator of the Convergence of Actions around the President of the Republic for the 21st Century (CAP 21), a coalition of 47 parties supporting Wade.

Wade was defeated in the February–March 2012 presidential election, and the PDS was badly beaten in the July 2012 parliamentary election. Thiam was not re-elected to the National Assembly, but Souleymane Ndéné Ndiaye resigned his parliamentary seat in December 2012, and Thiam, as the top PDS alternate candidate, replaced him as a Deputy in the National Assembly. He took his seat on 7 January 2013, although some expressed concern that Thiam, an elderly man, was in poor health.

Thiam continued his academic work. He was a member of the UNESCO committee that wrote the organisation’s General History of Africa and from 2013 coordinated the writing Of the General History of Senegal, an attempt to describe the country’s history outside of the French-centred narrative previously used.

Thiam took part in President Macky Sall's state visit to France in December 2016. During his career he served as vice-president of the Senegalese Association of History and Geography Teachers, Secretary General of the Pan-African Association of Historians and President of the Senegalese Commission for the Reform of Education in History and Geography. He died on 31 October 2020 in Dakar after a short illness.

== Select academic work ==
- La grève des cheminots du Sénégal de septembre 1938, Dakar, Université de Dakar, 1972, 2 vol., 272 pp. + 133 pp. (Master's thesis)
- (in collaboration with Nadiour Ndiaye), Histoire du Sénégal et de l'Afrique, Dakar, Les Nouvelles Éditions Africaines, 1976, ISBN 2-7236-0115-3.
- Maba Diakhou Bâ, almamy du Rip (Sénégal), Paris, ABC, 1977. ISBN 9782858091027
- L' éducation civique dans les lycées et collèges : classe de 3e : le Sénégal et les institutions internationales, Les Nouvelles Éditions Africaines, 1979, ISBN 2-7236-0424-1.
- Géographie du Sénégal, Les Nouvelles Éditions Africaines, EDICEF, 1981, ISBN 2-85069-252-2.
- L’évolution politique et syndicale du Sénégal colonial de 1840 à 1936, Paris, Université de Paris I, 1983, 9 vol., 4,462 pages, doctoral thesis.
- Le Sénégal dans la guerre 14-18, ou le prix du combat pour l'égalité, Dakar, Les Nouvelles Éditions Africaines, 1992, ISBN 2-7236-1060-8
- Les origines du mouvement syndical africain, 1790-1929, L’Harmattan, 1993, ISBN 2-7384-0536-3
