= Alexander Hood (British Army officer, born 1888) =

British army general (1888–1980)

Lieutenant-General Sir Alexander Hood GBE KCB KCVO FRCP FRCSE
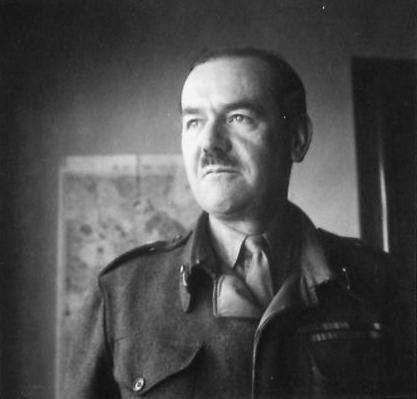
- Lieutenant-General Hood in 1944

Governor of Bermuda
- In office 1949 – 26 April 1955
- Monarchs: George VI; Elizabeth II
- Preceded by: William Addis
- Succeeded by: John Woodall

Personal details
- Born: 25 September 1888 Leith, Edinburgh, Scotland
- Died: 11 September 1980 (aged 91) Bermuda
- Spouse(s): Lady Evelyn Dulcia Hood (m. 1918; div. 1955) Helen Winifred Wilkinson (m. 1955)
- Children: 3
- Education: George Watson's College
- Alma mater: University of Edinburgh
- Occupation: Director General Army Medical Services; Governor of Bermuda

Military service
- Allegiance: United Kingdom
- Branch/service: British Army
- Unit: Royal Army Medical Corps
- Battles/wars: First World War; Western Front; Second World War
- Awards: Knight Grand Cross of the Order of the British Empire; Knight Commander of the Order of the Bath; Knight Commander of the Royal Victorian Order

Lieutenant-General Sir Alexander Hood, GBE, KCB, KCVO, FRCP, FRCSE (25 September 1888 – 11 September 1980) was a physician and British Army medical officer who served as the Director General of Army Medical Services from 1941 to 1948. He subsequently served as Governor of Bermuda from 1949 to 1955.

== Early life ==
Hood was born in Leith, Edinburgh, and educated at George Watson's College. He studied medicine at the University of Edinburgh, graduating in 1910 and achieving his MD in 1931 for his research on dysentery. In 1918, Hood married Evelyn Dulcia Ellwood, with whom he had one son and two daughters.

== Military career ==
After spending one year as the house surgeon in the Royal Infirmary of Edinburgh, Hood joined the Royal Army Medical Corps (RAMC). He served in France and Belgium during the First World War, and then in India and Afghanistan shortly afterwards. He became a specialist in pathology, serving in Meerut and Bangalore and then as deputy assistant district pathologist for Madras region. Hood conducted research on cerebrospinal meningitis and pneumonic plague, and in 1929 he was appointed assistant district pathologist to Southern Command.

With the outbreak of the Second World War, Hood was given the rank of colonel and made deputy director of medical services, Palestine. In 1941, he was promoted over several more senior figures to become Lieutenant-General Director General Army Medical Services. As DGAMS, Hood was credited with supporting developments in Army Psychiatry, helping to provide forward surgery and reorganise field medical units, and organising a blood transfusion service. By August, he was also honorary physician to George VI. He served for far longer as DGAMS than was usual. He also decreed that medical research conducted on soldiers should be solely for the purpose of preventing and curing disease and allaying injury. Hood had hoped to become the first head of combined medical service for Navy, Army and Air Force, but this did not happen.

== Civil career ==
Hood worked for one year in the Ministry of Health. After this, he was appointed Governor and Commander-in-Chief Bermuda. As Governor, Hood oversaw the closure of the Bermuda Garrison in 1953 and also acted as host to Winston Churchill, Anthony Eden, and Dwight D. Eisenhower during the Bermuda Conferences. The closure of the garrison was completed by 1 May 1953, but was very short-lived. However, a detachment of the Royal Welch Fusiliers was temporarily posted to Bermuda immediately after for the duration of the conference, planned for June, 1953. The conference was actually delayed until December, when the Prime Minister was convinced to reverse the closure of the garrison, resulting in 'A' Company, 1st Battalion, Duke of Cornwall's Light Infantry (1 DCLI) being posted to Prospect Camp in 1954. Hood's tenure in the role was extended twice.

Hood resigned effective 26 April 1955, with no explanation given. A few months later, he was granted a divorce from Lady Evelyn Dulcia Hood and married Mrs Helen Winifred Wilkinson of Hamilton Parish, Bermuda, on the same day. The couple lived at Callan Glen, in Hamilton Parish.

== Other achievements ==
Hood enjoyed golf and was the RAMC champion. He won the Queen Victoria Jubilee Vase at St Andrews in 1953.

When Hood died in Bermuda on 11 September 1980, his service with the RAMC was commemorated by the naming in his honour of a lecture theatre in the training depot.

The National Portrait Gallery holds a number of photographic images of Hood, mostly by Walter Stoneman.

== Bibliography ==
- Smart, Nick (2005). Biographical Dictionary of British Generals of the Second World War. Barnesley: Pen & Sword. ISBN 1844150496.
