= Madior Diouf =

Senegalese politician (1939–2025)

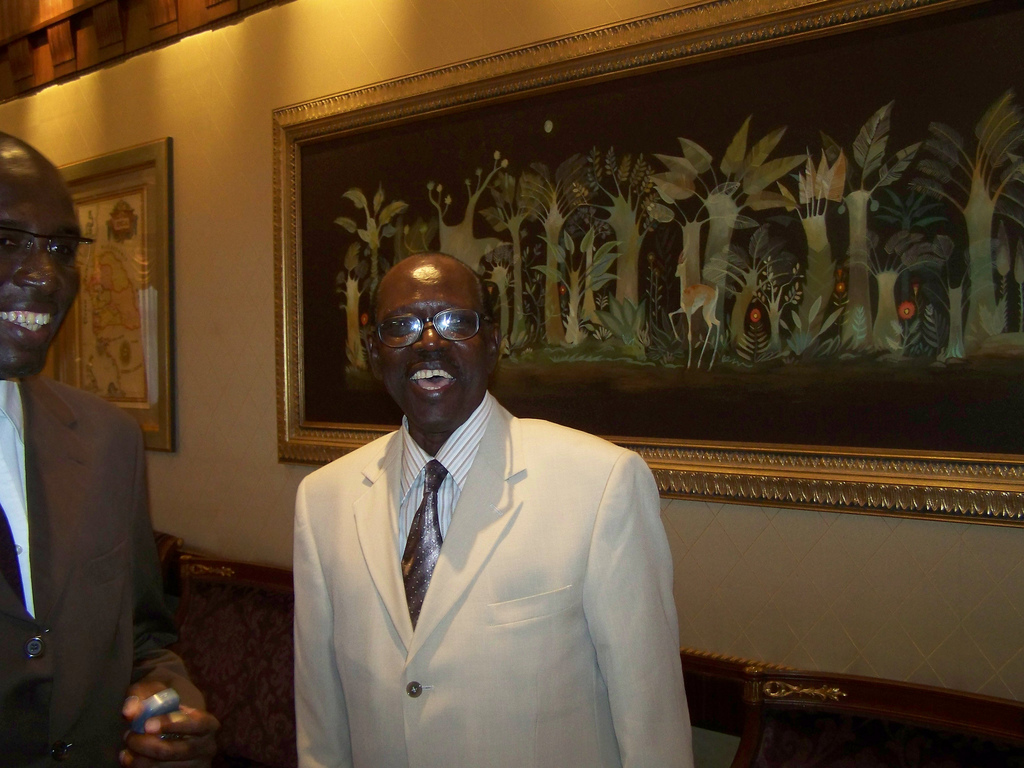
- Diouf in 2008

Minister of Higher Education
- In office 3 April 2000 – 4 March 2001

Personal details
- Born: 1939; Fimela, French Senegal, French West Africa
- Died: 23 January 2025 (aged 85); Dakar, Senegal
- Political party: RND
- Occupation: Academic

Madior Diouf (1939 – 23 January 2025) was a Senegalese politician of the National Democratic Rally (RND).

== Life and career ==
Born in Fimela in 1939, Diouf worked as a professor of literature at Cheikh Anta Diop University. Under the second government of Prime Minister Moustapha Niasse, he served as Minister of Higher Education. He was also the RND candidate in the 1993 Senegalese presidential election, earning 0.97% of the vote.

Diouf died in Dakar on 23 January 2025, at the age of 85.

== Publications ==
- Comprendre Véhi-Ciosane et le Mandat d'Ousmane Sembène (1986)
- Critique d'une œuvre: Nini, mulâtresse du Sénégal, d'Abdoulaye Sadji (1990)
- La civilisation Sereer (1990)
- La personnalité Sereer à travers les âges : La civilisation Sereer d'hier à demain (1991)
