= William Addis =

William Addis may refer to:

- William Addis (colonial administrator) (1901–1978), British governor of Seychelles
- William Addis (entrepreneur) (1734–1808), English inventor of the first mass-produced toothbrush
- William Edward Addis (1844–1917), Scottish-born Australian colonial clergyman
- William Adyes or Addis (1520–1558/9), English politician, MP for Worcester
