= Suxuba =

Suxuba (full title: Suxuba : correspondance ouvrière) was a Senegalese leftwing publication. It appeared in the late 1980s. It was published by the 'Cercle des lecteurs de Suxuba'. The editor of the magazine was Abdoulaye Nguette. The leader of the group behind the publication was Malick Ndiaye.

In 1991 the Cercle des lecteurs de Suxuba merged into And-Jëf/African Party for Democracy and Socialism. Prior to the foundation of AJ/PADS, the Suxuba group had taken part in the Left Pole.
