= Antiimperialist Action Front – Suxxali Reew Mi =

Political front in Senegal

Antiimperialism Action Front - Suxxali Reew Mi
- President: Mamadou Dia
- Founded: 3 August 1983
- Ideology: Communism; Marxism; Socialism; Factions; Trotskyism; Conservatism
- Political position: Centre-right to far-left

Antiimperialist Action Front-Suxxali Reew Mi (French: Front d'Action Anti-Impérialiste - Suxxali Reew Mi) was a front of political parties in Senegal. The front was constituted on August 3, 1983. The member parties were LCT, MDP, PAI and PPS.

The president of the front was Mamadou Dia. The front took the programme of a predecessor structure, COSU.

== Sources ==
- Nzouankeu, Jacques Mariel. Les partis politiques sénégalais. Dakar: Editions Clairafrique, 1984.
