= Charles Stewart Addis =

Scottish banker (1861–1945)

Sir Charles Stewart Addis KCMG (23 November 1861 – 14 December 1945) was a Scottish banker.

== Early life ==
Addis was born on 23 November 1861 in Edinburgh, Scotland. He was the son of Robina Scott (née Thorburn) Addis and the Rev. Thomas Addis, a minister of the Free Church of Scotland.

He was educated at the Edinburgh Academy.

== Career ==
Between 1876 and 1880, Addis worked for Peter Dowie and Co., Grain Importers of Leith. Beginning in 1880, he worked with the Hongkong and Shanghai Banking Corporation and continued with them until his retirement in 1933. In 1883 he was posted to Singapore, then to the HSBC head office in Hong Kong. He was director of the Bank of England between 1918 and 1932.

He was appointed Knight Bachelor in 1913 and Knight Commander of the Order of St Michael and St George in 1921. He was also awarded the honorary degree of Doctor of Law.

== Personal life ==
On 6 June 1894, Addis married Elizabeth Jane "Eba" McIsaac at Ardrossan, Ayrshire. Elizabeth was a daughter of James McIsaac and Elizabeth (née Watson) McIsaac. They lived at Woodside, Frant, Sussex. Together, they were the parents of thirteen children, including:

- Thomas Addis (1895–1952), High Court judge and President of the High Court of Ethiopia, who married Constance Louise Wallis, daughter of Arthur Henry Cumberbatch Wallis, in 1937.
- Elizabeth Addis (1897–1980), who married Sir Dallas Bernard, 1st Baronet in 1922.
- Charles Thorburn Addis (1898–1962), who married Pamela Poland, daughter of Rear Admiral Arthur Allan Poland.
- Robina Scott Addis (1900–1986), who was one of the earliest professional psychiatric social workers in Britain.
- Sir William Addis (1901–1978), the Governor of Seychelles who married Rosemary Gardner, daughter of Rev. Richard Titley Gardner.
- Susan Addis (1903–1987), who married Sir Percy Lawrence, 2nd Baronet in 1925.
- George Herbert Addis (1904–1936), who died unmarried.
- Henrietta Mary Addis (1906–1987), who married Edmund Booth, son of Sir Alfred Allen Booth, 1st Baronet.
- Margaret Kathleen Addis (1908–2006), who married Lt.-Col. Hon. Alexander Campbell Geddes, son of Auckland Geddes, 1st Baron Geddes in 1934.
- Jean Alison Addis (1910–2000), who married George Henry Pownall, son of George Emerson Pownall, in 1940.
- Rachel Forrester Addis (1912–2002), who married John Frederick Cornes, son of Julian Cornes, in 1937.
- Sir John Mansfield Addis (1914–1983), who was a diplomat and died unmarried.
- Richard Graham Addis (1916–1944), who married Gillian Dearmer, daughter of Rev. Percy Dearmer, in 1941 and was killed in action, at the age of 27, on the destroyer H.M.S. Laforey, off Anzio.

Addis died on 14 December 1945. Lady Addis died on 17 April 1952.
