= Socialist Workers Organization =

Socialist Workers Organization is the name of more than one political organization:

- Socialist Workers Organization (New Zealand)
- Socialist Workers Organisation (Senegal)
