= 2001 Senegalese constitutional referendum =

- 7 January 2001

Results
Choice	Votes	%
Yes	1,559,432	94.02%
No	99,108	5.98%
Valid votes	1,658,540	98.42%
Invalid or blank votes	26,622	1.58%
Total votes	1,685,162	100.00%
Registered voters/turnout	2,563,422	65.74%

A constitutional referendum was held in Senegal on 7 January 2001. Voters were asked whether they approved of a new constitution. It was approved by 94% of voters, leading to early parliamentary elections taking place in April 2001.

== Background ==
The proposed constitution would abolish the Senate, which had only come into existence in 1999; its first election had been boycotted by the opposition parties, who viewed its creation as unnecessary. It also reduced the presidential term from seven to five years.

== Result ==
Choice	Votes	%
For	1,559,432	94.02
Against	99,108	5.98
Total	1,658,540	100.00
Valid votes	1,658,540	98.42
Invalid/blank votes	26,622	1.58
Total votes	1,685,162	100.00
Registered voters/turnout	2,563,522	65.74
Source: African Elections Database
