= National Democratic Rally (Senegal) =

Political party in Senegal

The National Democratic Rally (French: Rassemblement national démocratique) is a political party in Senegal.

== History ==
The party was legalised on 18 June 1981, and contested the 1983 general elections, when it won a single seat in the National Assembly. Although it did not run in the 1988 general elections, it put forward Madior Diouf as its candidate in the 1993 presidential elections. Diouf finished sixth out of eight candidates with 1% of the vote.

Prior to the 1993 parliamentary elections the party joined the Let Us Unite Senegal alliance, which won three seats. The party ran alone in the 1998 parliamentary elections, winning one seat. It retained its sole seat in the 2001 elections
