= John Patrick Addis =

Former American police officer and criminal

John Patrick Addis (May 1950 – October 2006) was an American law enforcement officer, parental child kidnapper, suspected domestic abuser, prime suspect in the murders of two women, and fugitive from justice.

== Early and personal life ==
John Addis was born in Flint, Michigan. His first marriage was to a woman named Jodi. Jodi wanted to settle down in Michigan and raise children, but John, not wanting to attend college, relocated the Addis family to Sitka, Alaska. Their marriage lasted almost 11 years.

Although the marriage appeared happy to outsiders, Jodi later confessed their family life wasn't as good as it outwardly appeared; she described John as being very controlling over the family, and especially towards Jodi. He tried to manage almost every aspect of Jodi's life. John also labeled Jodi as "Mother" while ordering his wife around as though he were the woman's boss. She later confessed John began abusing her both verbally and physically and that the abuse began right after the couple relocated to Alaska. He didn't allow Jodi to work outside the home, drive or even have friends. John also compelled his wife to always feel isolated, helpless and completely dependent under him.

== Career ==
Addis started his career with law enforcement by working for Sitka city dog catcher. He was first assigned into Fort Yukon, Alaska, then transferred to Fairbanks during the mid-1970s. He began working alongside Alaska State Troopers in 1974.

During later years, however, Addis' fellow officers started seeing changes in his behavior; he insisted straight-faced towards his colleagues he saw little humans as "the thems". His violent, controlling behavior became more obvious to his co-workers. In either December 1982 or January 1983, John Addis resigned from the force.

== Later years ==
After their fourth child was born in 1982, Jodi made the decision to distance herself from John, and filed for divorce. Jodi won custody of the Addis children in the end; John, however, was allowed "liberal" visitations by the court during the school year and custody up to six weeks each summer.

John Addis started another relationship with a different woman named Sarah, who was also a Fairbanks resident. In December 1982, the couple married. They relocated to Florida. Within five months of marriage, however, Sarah divorced Addis; she later returned to Fairbanks. Sarah later confessed that during their five-month marriage, John was constantly disappearing for several weeks at one time. She also mentioned that Addis was planning on kidnapping his children, but Sarah warned him against committing a serious crime.

Several months following Sarah's divorcing John, he became involved with yet another woman, Toni. She was a pharmacist in the Sarasota area. They married almost immediately. In September 1985, they had a daughter.

Addis began informing Toni that he was planning to kidnap his kids. Toni warned Addis against doing so, and that she wasn't having any part of a crime. After their daughter was born, Addis became physically violent against Toni; she mentioned John oftentimes grabbed her harshly, pinned her down and once pushed her against the wall inside her residence. Following an incident of violence, Toni sought an order of protection and Addis filed for divorce.

In August 1986, Addis demanded visitations of his children in Alaska; Jodi, however, sent the matter to court and demanded the visitation happen in Alaska rather than Florida, but a judge ordered visitation rights in Florida. When it was time for the children to return to Fairbanks, Addis absconded with the children and hid from authorities.

Jodi contacted the police. Fairbanks police began searching for the children and their father and involved law enforcement agents in Michigan where Addis' family were living and where Jodi thought Addis might have been hiding the children. The Federal Bureau of Investigation became involved.

Eight months later, at a gymnasium in Kalispell, Montana, a person recognized a stranger who was exercising there that met the description of Addis. The person contacted local police whom arrested John Addis.

The authorities located the children locked in a cabin outside of Kalispell; the children were in good health and unharmed. John Addis was sentenced to four years in an Alaska state prison. He served 18 months. Addis was then a convicted felon. He was released from prison in 1988.

== Involvements in murders ==
Beginning in late 1994 into 1995, Addis, by then operating under the assumed identity John Edwards, was living in Las Vegas. In mid-to-late spring 1995, Addis (as John Edwards), while working at the World's Gym, met then-39-year-old Joann Albanese (January 20, 1956 – August 1995) through a gym client, Tara Rivera. Albanese and Addis were in a relationship for several months; Rivera, however, started having regrets about having introduced Albanese to Addis.

One evening, when Rivera, along with her husband, met with Albanese and Addis at dinner, according to Rivera, Addis had an explosive temper; his face began twisting following an innocent comment Rivera made. After getting home, Rivera told her husband there may have been something wrong with Addis; she planned on warning Albanese and advising her to dump Addis.

When Rivera approached Albanese, expressing her concerns about Addis, Albanese agreed something was not right with Addis; she mentioned to Rivera that Addis wasn't letting her from his sight and would not even let Albanese use the bathroom without him present. Albanese told Rivera she worried about Addis living inside the same residence alongside her daughters.

On August 18, 1995, Albanese telephoned Rivera and informed the latter that she couldn't take any more of Addis' controlling behavior and violence toward her; Albanese decided to end the relationship with Addis and planned on taking him to a nice dinner, then informing him the relationship would be over between them. Rivera never heard anything from her Albanese again.

When Albanese's ex-husband Tom drove his children back to their mother's residence on August 20, the truck belonging to Addis was parked in the street. When the girls went into the residence early that Sunday afternoon, they discovered their mother wasn't there and that the lights throughout the single-family home were all on, the door of their mother's room was open, her car was missing, and Albanese's purse was inside the drawer.

The girls telephoned their father, who in turn gave local police a warning about the missing mother. Several days passed, during which Joann Albanese's family managed to have police convinced that Joann would never abandon her daughters without giving them information on where she was traveling.

Joann's family became very concerned that Addis might have had close associations with the disappearance of Joann Albanese; Joann's oldest daughter mentioned that her mother and the boyfriend were constantly shouting at each other. Joann's sister hardly even liked Addis; furthermore, the sister felt that Joann's new boyfriend only wanted money.

Joann's sister asked Detective Hanna, then working in the Las Vegas Police Department, if she could look inside the pickup truck of her sister's boyfriend; what the sister found in the pickup truck then convinced Las Vegas Police officials to take closer looks into John Edwards.

Police became worried and concerned that the man passing himself off under the identity John Edwards was really John Patrick Addis, and that he was using an identification from a Cape Coral, Florida man.

The 1993 Honda Accord that belonged to Joann Albanese was discovered by a hiker three days after she vanished from her home; the vehicle was discovered in Little Hell's Canyon, near Prescott, Arizona.

In late 1996, a man labeling himself as John Stone walked into the Gold's Gym in Guadalajara, Mexico. He met Laura Liliana Casillas Padilla (1971–October 18, 2006).

In March of the following year, an episode of the television series Geraldo covering John Addis and the disappearance of Joann Albanese aired. A tipster subsequently telephoned the show and reported seeing a male with a similar description to Addis at the Gold's Gym. When the gym manager informed Stone a woman called the gym seeking someone who fit his description, Addis left the area.

In mid-October 1998, just over three years after Albanese disappeared from her residence, a hunter discovered the remains of Joann Albanese in Little Hell Canyon; several weeks following the discovery, Addis was classified under the FBI Ten Most Wanted Fugitives and listed under America's Most Wanted beginning in November 1998 and extending until May 2005.

On October 18, 2006, nine years after he and wife Laura Liliana left from Guadalajara, their neighbors in Chiapas realized they hadn't seen Addis, his wife or his children for several days; when the neighbors inspected the Addis apartment, they noticed a pungent smell. Police entered the home and found Laura Liliana dead along with her two children atop their beds. Over twenty syringes were found near Laura's body.

Several weeks following Laura Liliana's murder, John Patrick Addis died from a heart attack at age 56. He was later buried in Guatemala.
