= Reenu-Rew =

Political group in Senegal

- Leader: Landing Savané
- Founded: 1973
- Dissolved: 1974
- Merged into: And-Jëf
- Ideology: Marxism; Communism
- Political position: Left-wing

Reenu-Rew (Wolof for 'Roots of the Nation', French for "Les racines de la nation") was a radical Marxist group in Senegal, founded in 1973 by Landing Savané. It published Xarébi (Struggle). In 1974 Reenu-Rew stood behind the initiative to form And-Jëf.
