= Socialist Workers Organisation (Senegal) =

- Leader: Sally Ndongo and Babacar Doudou
- Founded: 1973
- Dissolved: 1991
- Merged into: And-Jëf/African Party for Democracy and Socialism
- Ideology: Trotskyism; Socialism
- Political position: Left-wing

The Socialist Workers Organisation (French: Organisation Socialiste des Travailleurs) was a Trotskyist organisation in Senegal.

It was founded in France by Sally Ndongo and Babacar Doudou in 1973, with the name Grouping of Revolutionary Workers (Groupement des Ouvriers Révolutionnaires, GOR). They had previously been members of the first post-war Trotskyist organisation in Senegal, the Workers Avant-Garde, which had collapsed soon after expelling them.

The GOR split in 1976, with a minority who had called for class struggle to be placed ahead of national liberation forming the Communist Workers League (LCT). The majority maintained the GOR, and in 1977 started activities inside Senegal. That year, the GOR and the LCT undertook unity discussions, but foundered after the LCT argued that the Soviet Union did not play a progressive role.

The GOR subsequently joined the United Secretariat of the Fourth International. It was registered as a legal political party in February 1982, taking the name OST. In the 1983 Senegalese presidential election, it supported Majhemout Diop of the African Independence Party.

The general secretary of OST was Mbaye Bathily.

OST published Combat Ouvrier.

In 1991 OST become one of the founding members of And-Jëf/African Party for Democracy and Socialism.
