= And-Jëf/African Party for Democracy and Socialism =

And-Jëf/African Party for Democracy and Socialism And-Jëf/Parti Africain pour la démocratie et le socialisme
- General Secretary: Landing Savané
- Founded: 1991
- Merger of: And-Jëf/Revolutionary Movement for New Democracy; Socialist Workers Organisation; Union for People's Democracy; Suxuba
- Ideology: Socialism; Marxism; Communism; Factions: Marxism-Leninism; Maoism; Hoxhaism; Trotskyism; Reformism; Social democracy
- Political position: Left-wing

The And-Jëf/African Party for Democracy and Socialism (And-Jëf/Parti Africain pour la démocratie et le socialisme) is a socialist political party in Senegal led by Landing Savané.

And-Jëf/PADS was founded in 1991, through the merger of And-Jëf / Revolutionary Movement for New Democracy, Socialist Workers Organisation, Union for People's Democracy and circle of readers of Suxuba. Savané ran as the party's presidential candidate in the 1993 election, taking 2.91% of the vote. AJ/PADS was the only major opposition group to consistently refuse to participate in the government under President Abdou Diouf and the Socialist Party (PS). At its February 1998 congress, it considered but decided against joining the Socialist International. In March 1999, AJ/PADS and two other left-wing parties, the Party of Independence and Labor (PIT) and the Democratic League/Movement for the Labour Party (LD/MPT), agreed to support the candidacy of opposition leader Abdoulaye Wade of the Senegalese Democratic Party (PDS) in the 2000 presidential election. After Wade's victory, the party gained a presence in the government, which it maintained until 2007.

In the parliamentary election held on 29 April 2001, AJ/PADS won 4.05% of the popular vote and 2 out of 120 seats in the National Assembly.

Savané ran as the party's candidate again in the February 2007 presidential election, and he said that the party's alliance with Wade would end after the election regardless of the winner. In the election, Savané took seventh place with 2.07% of the vote. Shortly after the election, the AJ/PADS ministers resigned from the government. On 5 April, it was announced that the party, as part of the coalition And Defaar Sénégal, would contest the June 2007 parliamentary election, despite a boycott of the election by many other opposition parties. Party spokesman Madièye Mbodj said that boycotting was "not an efficient means to meet a political demand". The coalition won three seats, including one for Savané. In the August 2007 election to the Senate, AJ/PADS won one seat, from Vélingara Department, out of 35 elected seats; Wade's PDS won all of the other seats.

After 2007, split developed in the party between the "reformist" and "communist" factions, with the latter group, which includes Madièye Mbodj, criticizing Savané and party leadership for their cooperation with Wade and alleged abandonment of communist ideas for the sake of self-interest. Savané and the reformist faction split into And Jëf / African Party for Democracy and Socialism / Authentic (AJ/PADS/A) and joined the Patriotic Front for the Defence of the Republic in 2014, a coalition of parties affiliated with the Senegalese Democratic Party.
