= Pape Diop =

Senegalese politician

- Usmaan Sonko
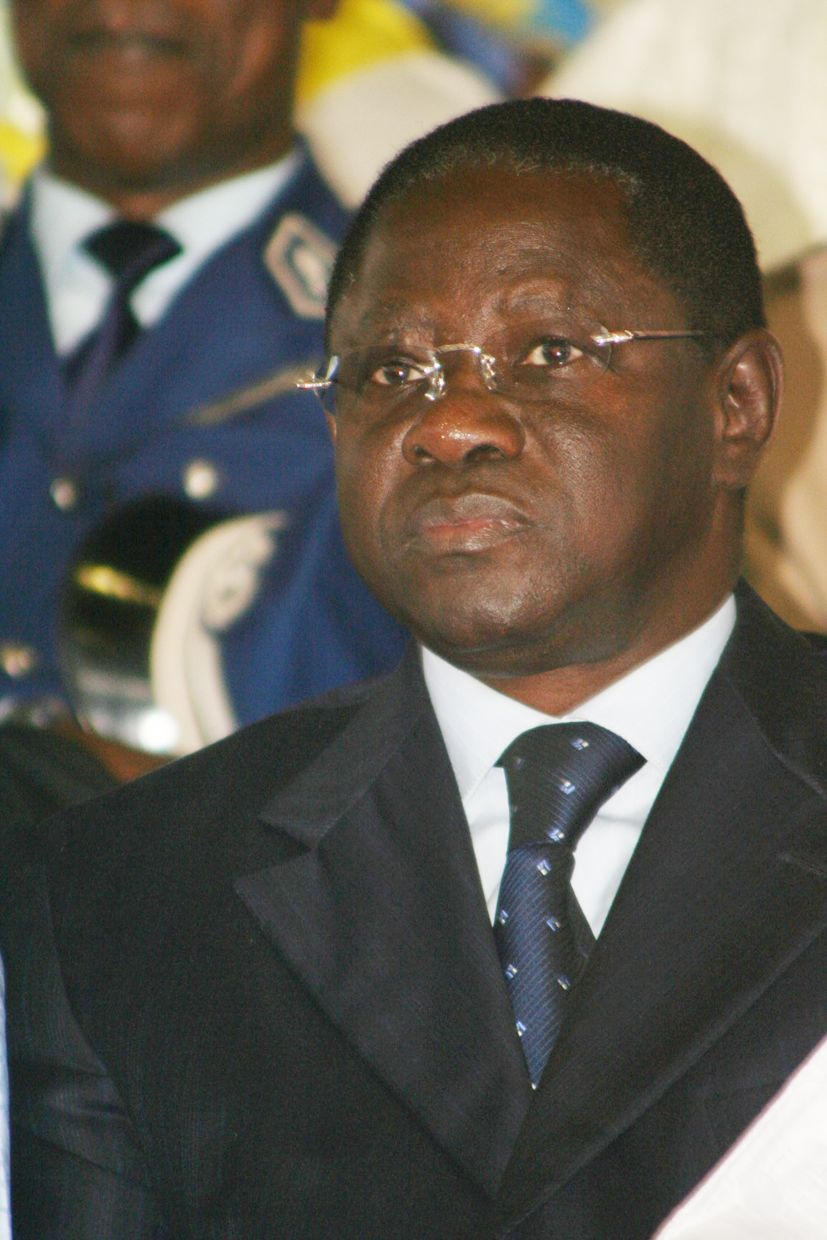

President of the Senate of Senegal
- In office 3 October 2007 – 19 September 2012
- Preceded by: Abdoulaye Diack
- Succeeded by: Post abolished

Personal details
- Born: 17 April 1954 (age 72) Dakar, Senegal

Pape Diop (born 17 April 1954) is a Senegalese politician and a leading member of the Senegalese Democratic Party (PDS) who was President of the Senate of Senegal from 2007 to 2012. He was Mayor of Dakar, the capital city, from 2002 to 2009, as well as President of the National Assembly from 2002 to 2007.

Diop was born in Dakar. He joined the PDS in 1974 and was Treasurer-General of the PDS from 1992 to 1997. He was elected to the National Assembly as a PDS candidate from Dakar Department in the May 1993 parliamentary election and was re-elected in the May 1998 parliamentary election and the April 2001 parliamentary election.

He was elected as Mayor of Dakar on May 12, 2002, receiving 52% of the vote and defeating long-time mayor Mamadou Diop. Pape Diop, a wealthy businessman who was the CEO of a seafood export company, Soumex SA, was still a relatively unknown figure at this time, but was backed by President Abdoulaye Wade and Minister of State Idrissa Seck.

Diop became President of the National Assembly in June 2002 in addition to his position as Mayor of Dakar. Within the PDS, Diop was a member of the party's Steering Committee and National Secretariat as of 2002. He served as President of the National Assembly until June 2007, when he was replaced by former Prime Minister Macky Sall; Diop was expected to become President of the Senate, which was being re-established.

Diop did not run in the 2007 Senate election and was instead one of the 65 Senators appointed by Wade. He was elected as President of the Senate on October 3, 2007; as the only candidate for the position, he received the votes of 99 of the 100 Senators. As Senate President, Diop would constitutionally succeed Wade if the latter is unable to finish his term.

Diop was again a candidate in the March 2009 local election in Dakar, but the opposition Bennoo Siggil Senegal won an overwhelming victory. On April 18, 2009, Khalifa Sall of the Socialist Party was elected to succeed Diop as Mayor of Dakar; Diop himself was not present for the vote. Sall took office as Mayor on April 20. Diop was present for the ceremony and expressed pride in his work as Mayor, as well as confidence in Sall's abilities, despite their political differences. For his part, Sall spoke positively of Diop, but his supporters booed Diop on the occasion.

== See also ==
- List of mayors of Dakar
- Timeline of Dakar
