= And-Jëf/Revolutionary Movement for New Democracy =

Political party in Senegal

- Leader: Landing Savané
- Founded: 28 December 1974
- Dissolved: 1991
- Succeeded by: And-Jëf/African Party for Democracy and Socialism
- Ideology: Communism; Marxism-Leninism
- Political position: Left-wing

Party flag

And-Jëf/Revolutionary Movement for New Democracy (in French: And-Jëf/Mouvement Révolutionnaire pour la Démocratie Nouvelle) was a Marxist-Leninist political party in Senegal.

And-Jëf (Wolof for 'Act Together') was founded by Reenu-Rew at a clandestine congress on December 28, 1974. Among its initial members were teacher and peace activist Seynabou Male Cissé.

Most of the leadership, including the main leader Landing Savané, was jailed in 1975. Savané was released in 1976, and resumed political activity.

And-Jëf was very active within the trade union movement UTLS.

In March 1980 And-Jëf started the publication Jaay Doolé Bi (The Proletarian).

In July 1981 the group was registered as a legal political party under the name And-Jëf/MRDN.

In 1991 And-Jëf/MRDN was one of the founding members of And-Jëf/African Party for Democracy and Socialism (AJ/PADS).
