= Movement of Young Marxist–Leninists =

Marxist-Leninist group in Senegal

Movement of Young Marxist–Leninists (French: Mouvement des Jeunes marxistes-léninistes) was a radical Marxist-Leninist group in Senegal, founded by Landing Savané in 1970. MJML was the continuation of Democratic Youth.

MJML was short-lived. The brothers Blondin Diop split from it and created the Committee for the Initiative for Permanent Revolutionary Action. Landing would later form the group Reenu-Rew in 1973.
