= Battle of Crotoy (1347) =

Naval battle during the Hundred Years' War

- Part of Hundred Years' War (1337–1360)
Date	25 June 1347
Location	English Channel, mouth of the Somme river off the Le Crotoy 50°13′N 1°36′E
Result	English victory

Belligerents
Kingdom of France	Kingdom of England

Commanders and leaders
Philip VI	William de Bohun, 1st Earl of Northampton, Laurence Hastings, 1st Earl of Pembroke

Strength
Unknown	Unknown

Casualties and losses
Unknown	Unknown

The Battle of Crotoy was a naval battle which occurred on 25 June 1347 at the mouth of the Somme off the Le Crotoy, when a French fleet of 40 ships gathered in attempted to relieve Calais, where an English army under the command of King Edward III of England was besieging the French town during the Edwardian phase of the Hundred Years' War.

An English fleet commanded by William de Bohun, Earl of Northampton and Laurence Hastings, Earl of Pembroke defeated the French fleet.

With the relief attempt foiled, Calais capitulated in early August 1347, giving England a durable continental bridgehead and a forward base that shaped Channel warfare for generations. The episode is consistently placed by historians as one of the closing moves that made the surrender inevitable.
