= Addis Priestley =

Australian rules footballer, born 1903

Personal information
- Full name: Neils Addis Priestley
- Born: 8 September 1903; Yackandandah, Victoria
- Died: 12 September 1984 (aged 81); Frankston, Victoria

Playing career^{1}
Years	Club	Games (Goals)
1927	Hawthorn	2 (0)
- ^{1} Playing statistics correct to the end of 1927.

Neils Addis Priestley (8 September 1903 – 12 September 1984) was an Australian rules footballer who played for the Hawthorn Football Club in the Victorian Football League (VFL).
