= 2000 Senegalese presidential election =

- 27 February 2000 (first round); 19 March 2000 (second round)
- Turnout: 62.23% (first round) ▲10.77pp 60.75% (second round)
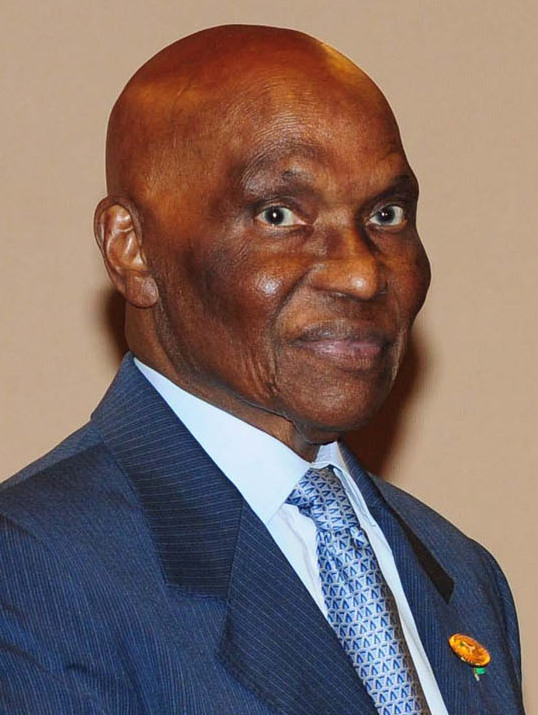

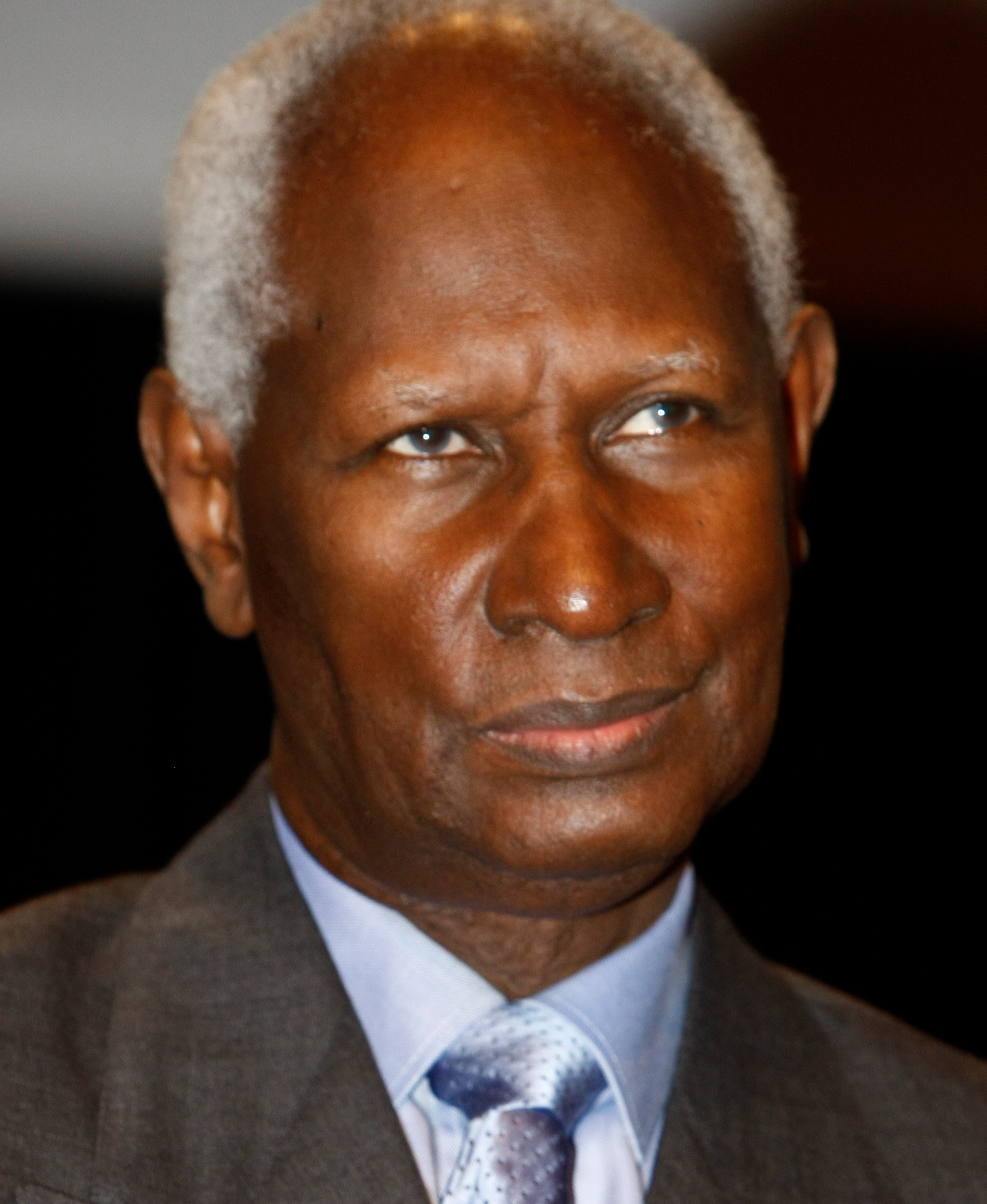
Candidate	Abdoulaye Wade	Abdou Diouf
Party	PDS	PS
Popular vote	969,332	687,969
Percentage	58.49%	41.51%
- First round results by region Wade: 40-50% Diouf: 40-50% 50-60%
President before election
Abdou Diouf
PS
Elected President
Abdoulaye Wade
PDS

Presidential elections were held in Senegal on 27 February 2000, with a second round taking place on 19 March after no candidate won over 50% of votes in the first round. Although incumbent President Abdou Diouf of the Socialist Party won the most votes in the first round, he was defeated by long-term opposition leader Abdoulaye Wade of the Senegalese Democratic Party in the second round, marking the first time that the Socialist Party and its predecessors had lost power since independence. Voter turnout was 62% in the first round and 61% in the second.

== Results ==
Candidate	Party	First round		Second round	
Candidate	Party	Votes	%	Votes	%
Abdou Diouf	Socialist Party	690,917	41.30	687,969	41.51
Abdoulaye Wade	Senegalese Democratic Party	518,740	31.01	969,332	58.49
Moustapha Niasse	Alliance of the Forces of Progress	280,538	16.77		
Djibo Leïty Kâ	Union for Democratic Renewal	118,484	7.08		
Iba Der Thiam	Convention of Democrats and Patriots	20,164	1.21		
Ousseynou Fall	Republican Party of Senegal	18,604	1.11		
Cheikh Abdoulaye Dièye	Front for Socialism and Democracy/Benno Jubël	16,211	0.97		
Mademba Sock	Rally of African Labourers–Senegal	9,326	0.56		
Total		1,672,984	100.00	1,657,301	100.00
Valid votes		1,672,984	98.62	1,657,301	99.37
Invalid/blank votes		23,400	1.38	10,474	0.63
Total votes		1,696,384	100.00	1,667,775	100.00
Registered voters/turnout		2,725,987	62.23	2,745,239	60.75
Source: African Elections Database, CC (first round), (second round)
