= Communist Workers League (Senegal) =

Political party in Senegal

- Founded: 1977
- Ideology: Communism; Marxism; Trotskyism; Socialism
- Political position: Left-wing

Communist Workers League (in French: Ligue Communiste des Travailleurs) was a Trotskyist political party in Senegal, founded in 1977. It originated from a split in GOR (the forerunner of the OST). It published Tribune Ouvrière. LCT adhered to the Fourth International - International Centre of Reconstruction of Pierre Lambert.

The first public act of LCT was a leafletting in support of the students strike at the Faculty of Science in Dakar in May 1977.

At the time of the 1978 elections, LCT advocated abstention.

LCT was awarded official recognition on July 8, 1982.

The general secretary was M. Mahmoud Saleh.
