= Staff Weather Officer =

Staff Weather Officer's Weather Parachutist Paraphernalia

Combat Weather Team Flash

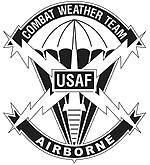
Combat Weather Team Crest

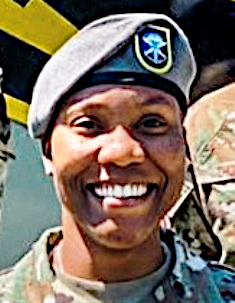
An Air Force weather parachutist—a staff weather officer with the 18th Combat Weather Squadron—wearing grey beret with Combat Weather Team Beret Flash and crest (2021)

Staff Weather Officers (SWOs) are United States Air Force personnel tasked with providing tactical and operational meteorological support for conventional Army forces.

The title is held by both officer and enlisted personnel while tasked with this duty. Previous and alternate names for Army weather support Airmen are: Battlefield Weather, Combat Weather, and Army Support Weather. Airmen at all levels are trained to integrate with planners and mission generators at all levels of Army command. Specifically, SWOs are typically aligned to Army echelons at and above the brigade level. The scope of support ranges from infusing environmental intelligence into all warfighting functions to providing mission execution and planning weather. SWOs are not to be confused with the now-defunct Air Force career field known as Special Operations Weather Team (SOWT).

== Training ==
SWOs complete the same core training requirements as all Air Force Weather personnel and are interchangeable in that sense. Prior to supporting Army units, they attend the Army Weather Support Course (AWSC) as part of their readiness training. It is a Combat Weather Squadron (CWS; also known as an Army weather support squadron) commander's responsibility to ensure readiness in support of Army missions and units.

=== Officers ===
Air Force weather officers are professional meteorologists, must hold at least a bachelor's degree in an appropriate field (meteorology, atmospheric science, etc.), and must meet the World Meteorological Organization (WMO) basic instruction requirements before entrance into the career field is allowed. After commissioning into the United States Air Force, officers must attend Officer Training School (OTS) at Maxwell AFB, Alabama (Unless ROTC/Air Force Academy cadet program was completed). Following OTS Officers will then attend the Weather Officer Course at Keesler AFB, Mississippi. Commanders may also elect to send officers to additional Global Force Management training to ensure seamless integration into senior (division-level and above) planning staffs.

=== Enlisted ===
Enlisted personnel are not required to have a degree, and must only meet specific aptitude test requirements to enter the career field. After enlistment, all members must attend Basic Military Training (BMT) at Lackland AFB, Texas. After BMT, an eight-month initial weather skills course is attended at Keesler AFB, Mississippi. Finally, a year of on the job training must be completed before fully qualified.

=== Staff Weather Officer ===
After completion of the Air Force Major Command (MAJCOM)- and commander-required trainings, weather personnel aligned to Army units are considered mission-ready.

==== Army Weather Support Course (AWSC) ====
The AWSC at Fort Huachuca, Arizona teaches Airmen how to effectively integrate at the Army tactical level and within lower-level planning staffs. Airmen study the Army's history, rank structure, organizational structure, and how weather impacts the military decision-making processes (MDMP). In addition to this course work, basic hand-to-hand combat, land navigation, and other pertinent battlefield "Soldier" skills are studied.

==== Evasion and Conduct After Capture (ECAC) ====
The ECAC course prepares military personnel to evade or effectively act and react after capture in a combat zone.

==== Additional and optional training ====
Commanders may require additional readiness training. SWOs continually qualify on weather positions and weapon systems, and must remain mission-ready through at all times. Annual trainings and internal or Army exercises help certify and qualify Airmen for deployment. Army schools such as Air Assault, Airborne, and Ranger schools are available for voluntary attendance, depending on the missions to which each CWS is aligned.
