= Yasin Avcı (footballer, born 1984) =

Turkish footballer

Personal information
- Full name: Yasin Avcı
- Date of birth: 3 August 1984 (age 42)
- Place of birth: İzmir, Turkey
- Height: 1.81 m (5 ft 11 1/2 in)
- Position: Midfielder

Youth career
- 1993–1999: Albertslund
- 1999–2001: Hvidovre

Senior career*
| Years | Team | Apps | (Gls) |
| 2001–2006 | Frem | 69 | (5) |
| 2006–2009 | AC Horsens | 62 | (3) |
| 2009–2010 | Lyngby Boldklub | 9 | (0) |
- * Club domestic league appearances and goals as of 22 October 2011

Yasin Avcı (born 3 August 1984) is a Turkish professional football midfielder, who is currently unattached.
