= Fikirte Addis =

Ethiopian fashion designer

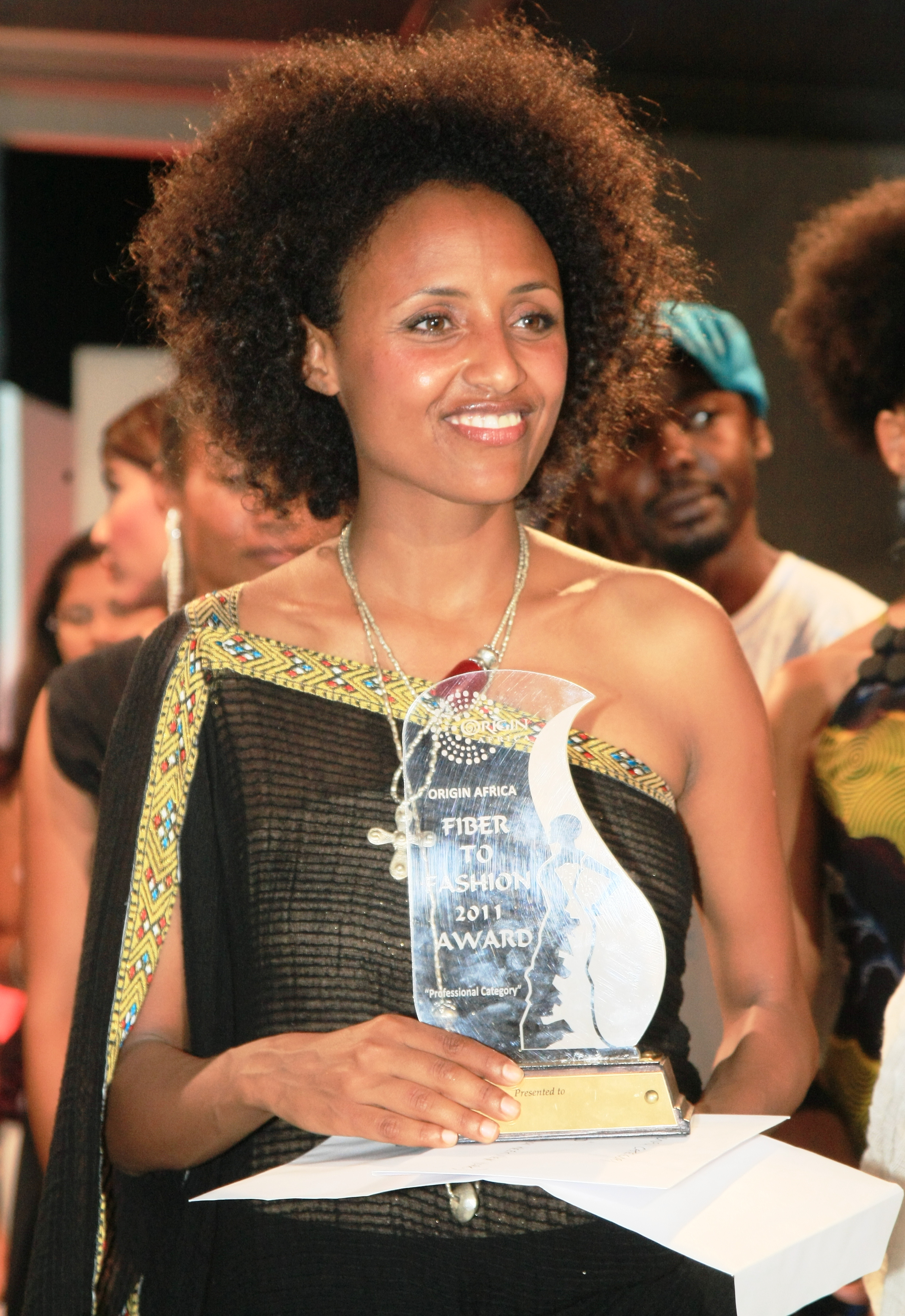
- Fikirte at the Origin Africa Fiber to Fashion Awards, 2011
- Born: Fikirte Addis; August 3, 1981 (age 44); Addis Ababa, Ethiopia
- Occupation: Designer
- Years active: 2009–present
- Website: yefikirdesign.com

Fikirte Addis (born August 3, 1981) is an Ethiopian fashion designer and the founder of the Addis Ababa–based label Yefikir Design (often styled Yefikir or YeFikir). Her work is noted for contemporary interpretations of Ethiopian traditional textiles and dress, including hand-woven cotton fabrics produced by local artisans.

== Early life and education ==
Addis was born in Addis Ababa, Ethiopia. She began experimenting with clothing design while in high school and later pursued fashion as a profession alongside studies and work in psychology.

== Career ==
Addis established Yefikir Design in 2009 in Addis Ababa, focusing on everyday wear and occasion garments that adapt Ethiopian traditional motifs and hand-loomed textiles for contemporary use. Her collections have been shown in Ethiopia and internationally, including at Africa Fashion Week New York (AFWNY).

In March 2011 Addis participated in the Origin Africa: Fiber to Fashion event in Mauritius, where she won a designer showcase award that led to an invitation to present at AFWNY 2011. She subsequently returned to show in 2012. Coverage of Ethiopia’s emerging fashion sector has also profiled Addis and Yefikir’s export ambitions and use of local supply chains.

Addis has discussed her design approach and the role of cultural heritage in public interviews and media features, including with Design Indaba (2016).
