= William Addis (colonial administrator) =

British colonial administrator (1901-1978)

Sir William Addis KBE CMG

Governor of Bermuda (acting)
- In office 1945 – May 1946
- Monarch: George VI
- Preceded by: Lord Burghley
- Succeeded by: Sir Ralph Leatham

Governor of the Seychelles
- In office 1953–1958
- Monarch: George VI
- Preceded by: Sir Frederick Crawford
- Succeeded by: Sir John Thorp

Personal details
- Born: 5 September 1901
- Died: 19 November 1978 (aged 77)
- Parent: Sir Charles Stewart Addis (father)
- Relatives: Robina Addis (sister); John Addis (brother); Jerry Cornes (brother-in-law)
- Education: Rugby School
- Alma mater: Magdalene College, Cambridge

Sir William Addis, KBE, CMG (5 September 1901 – 19 November 1978) was a British colonial administrator. He was Governor of Seychelles from 1953 to 1958. During his tenure as governor, he was responsible for Archbishop Makarios, who had been exiled to the colony from Cyprus.

== Life and career ==
The third son of the Scottish banker Sir Charles Stewart Addis, William Addis was educated at Rugby School and Magdalene College, Cambridge, where he took the mechanical science tripos in 1923. He entered the Colonial Administrative Service in 1924, and subsequently served in Zanzibar and Northern Rhodesia, with a secondment to the Dominions Office during 1933. He was private secretary to Sir Khalifa bin Harub, Sultan of Zanzibar from 1939 to 1945, and was a member of the Zanzibar Naval Volunteer Force during the same period.

From 1945 to 1950, Addis served as Colonial Secretary of Bermuda, and acted as governor during 1945 and 1946. From 1950 to 1953, he was based in Singapore as Deputy Commissioner-General for Colonial Affairs, South-East Asia, in succession to Sir Ralph Hone.

Horne was appointed Governor and Commander-in-Chief of the Seychelles, serving from 1953 until his retirement in 1958. During his tenure, Addis was responsible for Archbishop Makarios, who had been exiled to the Seychelles from Cyprus. During his tenure, the islands' first telephone exchange system was opened. In 1956, he welcomed the Duke of Edinburgh to the colony.

From 1958 to 1966, he held a temporary appointment in the Foreign Office.

Addis was appointed to the third class of the Order of the Brilliant Star of Zanzibar in 1945, was made a Companion of the Order of St Michael and St George in 1948, and was knighted as a Knight Commander of the Order of the British Empire in 1955.
