= Robina Addis =

Psychiatric social worker

Robina Scott Addis, OBE (1900–1986) was one of the earliest professional psychiatric social workers in Britain.

Addis was not always interested in Social Work. Originally, she read History at the University of Oxford, but after two years she was forced to cut her studies short due to illness. Later, in 1931, Addis decided to go to the London School of Economics where she became interested in the idea of child guidance which led her to apply for their Mental Health Course. She graduated from this in 1933.

After graduating, Addis had a varied career. She started off working in child guidance and then with the National Association for Mental Health (later renamed Mind), from which she retired in 1965. In 1960, she became Deputy General Secretary of Mind and later, in 1979, she founded the Child Guidance Trust in order to pass on her knowledge.

== Early life ==
Addis was the fourth of the thirteen children of Sir Charles and Lady Addis née Elizabeth Jane McIsaac. She would later cite her numerous siblings, nieces and nephews as a starting point for her interest in child psychology. The family resided at the country estate Woodside in Frant, Sussex.

One of her brothers, Sir John Mansfield Addis, was a diplomat in later life, and another brother William Addis was a colonial administrator and former Governor of Bermuda and Governor of the Seychelles.

== Education ==
Addis attended the University of Oxford to read History for two years before having to leave due to illness. Nevertheless, she afterwards spent five years working with Professor Charles Waley-Singer cataloguing the alchemical manuscripts of the British Isles. After this, Addis attended the London School of Economics with the idea of pursuing teaching and child psychology. While attending lectures on child psychology at LSE, Addis was introduced to the study of child guidance and applied to study what was then LSE's Mental Health Course. Due to credits from previous studies at LSE and practical experience before enrolling, Addis was able to skip the normal Social Science diploma that was expected. She qualified in 1933.
