= Jean Chrysostome Ngabitsinze =

Rwandan Economist and Politician

Professor Jean Chrysostome Ngabitsinze
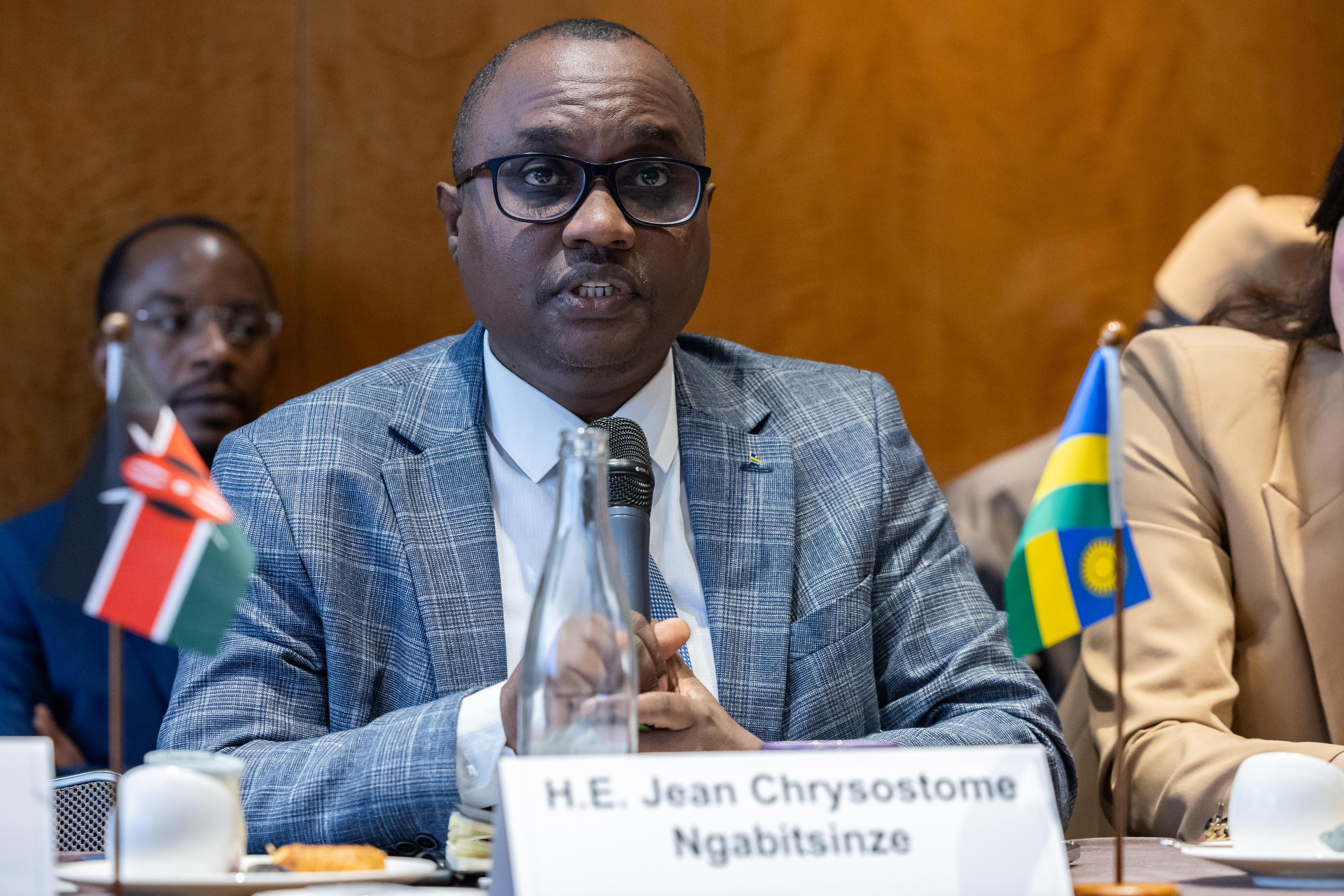

Rwanda Minister of Trade and Industry
- In office July, 2022 – August, 2024
- Appointed by: Paul Kagame
- Preceded by: Beata Habyarimana

Secretary-General of Social Democratic Party
- In office May, 2015 – Present
- Preceded by: Jean-Damascène Ntawukuriryayo

Rwanda Minister of State in MINAGRI
- In office March, 2020 – July, 2022
- Preceded by: Fulgence Nsengiyumva
- Succeeded by: Ildephonse Musafiri

Personal details
- Born: September 23, 1977 (age 49) Nyamagabe, Rwanda
- Citizenship: Rwanda
- Party: Social Democratic Party
- Spouse: Mushimiyimana Kayitesi Theophilla
- Children: 4
- Education: Ca' Foscari University of Venice; Università Cattolica del Sacro Cuore; University of Milan
- Occupation: Politician
- Profession: Agri-Food Exonomist

Jean Chrysostome Ngabitsinze (born 23 September 1977), is a Rwandan economist and politician, currently is the Group Director General of African Risk Capacity Group and UN Assistant Secretary General appointed on 29 April 2025 and assumed office on 11 July 2025. He served as the Rwandan Minister of Trade and Industry, from July 2022 until August 2024. Prior to his appointment, he was Minister of State in MINAGRI, since March 2020. In addition, Jean Chrysostome is the Secretary General of Social Democratic Party (PSD), since 2015. Jean Chrysostome holds a PhD in Agricultural Economics from University of Milan in Italy, and he is a professor of agriculture economics at University of Rwanda, since 2009.

== Early life and education ==
Jean Chrysostome was born on 23 September 1977 in Nyamagabe, Rwanda. He completed his secondary education at APE Rugunga in Kigali, Rwanda. In 2000, Jean Chrysostome attended Ca' Foscari University of Venice in Italy, he graduated with Bachelor of Science in Business Economics in 2004. Subsequently, Jean Chrysostome enrolled at Università Cattolica del Sacro Cuore in Italy to pursue a postgraduate degree, and he earned a master's degree in economics there in 2006. Since 2009, Jean Chrysostome holds a PhD in Agricultural Economics, Food and Environmental sciences from University of Milan in Italy.

== Academic career ==
After graduating with a PhD in Agricultural Economics from University of Milan, in 2009, Jean Chrysostome joined University of Rwanda where he served as senior lecturer in agriculture economics and raised to associate professor in 2019.

== Career in politics ==
=== PSD and Parliament ===
Jean Chrysostome is a member of Social Democratic Party (PSD), and he serves as its secretary general, since May 2015. In 2018, Jean Chrysostome was elected for Chamber of Deputies in Parliament of Rwanda as a PSD candidate. While he was in the parliament, he served as the head of Rwanda Public Accounts Committee (PAC), a committee which is responsible for examining the reports from government projects. Jean Chrysostome left the office in March 2020 when he was appointed in the Cabinet of Rwanda.

=== Cabinet of Rwanda ===
On March 9, 2020, Jean Chrysostome was appointed by President Paul Kagame in the Cabinet of Rwanda as the Minister of State in the Ministry of Agriculture and Animal Resources (MINAGRI). He succeeded Fulgence Nsengiyumva, during his tenure, the MINAGRI partnered with USAID to launch Kungahara Wagura Amasoko program, among others. The initiative was planned to facilitate estimate of US$300 million as new investments in Rwanda agricultural export sector. Also World Bank approved US$300M for Rwanda to commercialize de-risk agriculture. Jean Chrysostome served the office until July 2022. Subsequently, he was appointed as the Rwanda Minister of Trade and Industry succeeding Beata Habyarimana.

== Additional career ==
In 2016, Jean Chrysostome was appointed to the board of directors and became its chairperson of the National Agricultural Export Development Board (NAEB) for two years. In the same year 2016, he was elected the chairperson of the Huye District Council. Prior to that, he chaired the National Land Commission under the Rwandan Ministry of Natural Resources for three years since 2011.

== Martial arts ==
Jean Chrysostome admires and spends his free time playing Karate since his early age. He is decorated with various ranks including Second Dan in Shotokan Karate that he was awarded on August 20, 2023, during a Karate seminar held in Kigali, Rwanda.
