= Mark Cyubahiro Bagabe =

Rwandan scientist and government minister

Hon. Dr. Mark Cyubahiro Bagabe
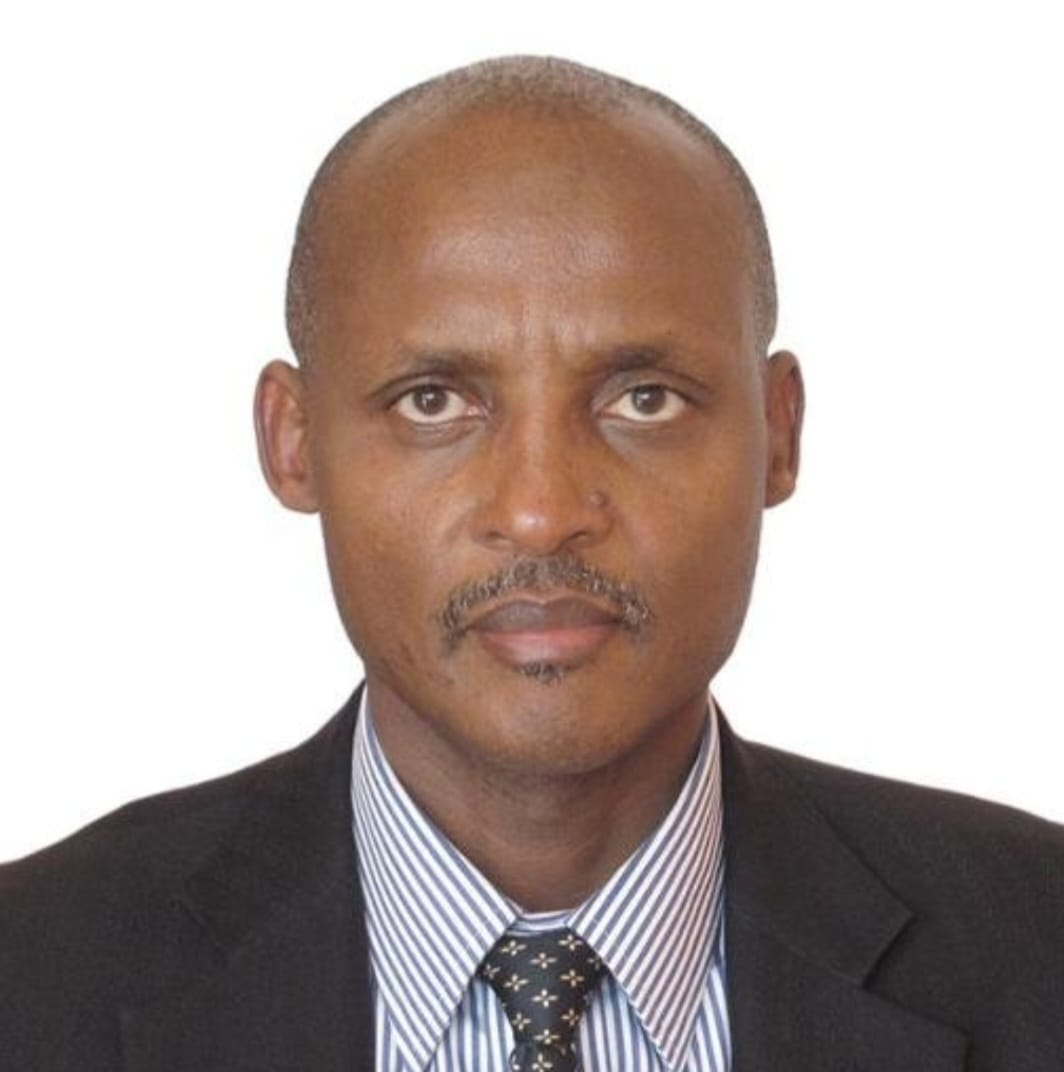

Minister of Agriculture and Animal Resources of Rwanda
- In office 18 October 2024 – 1 December 2025
- President: Paul Kagame
- Preceded by: Ildephonse Musafiri
- Succeeded by: Telesphore Ndabamenye

Personal details
- Born: 1959 (age 66–67)
- Citizenship: Rwandan
- Education: University of Reading
- Occupation: Agricultural scientist, public administrator

Mark Cyubahiro Bagabe (born 1959) is a Rwandan agricultural scientist and public administrator who served as Rwanda's Minister of Agriculture and Animal Resources from October 2024 to December 2025. He has headed several Rwandan public institutions, including the Institut des Sciences Agronomiques du Rwanda (ISAR), the Rwanda Standards Board (RSB), the Rwanda Agriculture and Animal Resources Development Board (RAB) and the Rwanda Inspectorate, Competition and Consumer Protection Authority (RICA). Since 2026 he has chaired the board of the Forum for Agricultural Research in Africa (FARA) and is currently serving as country director for Rwanda at the World Agriculture Forum.

== Education ==
Bagabe studied at the University of Reading in the United Kingdom, completing a Master of Science degree in technology of crop protection between 1988 and 1989 and a doctorate in plant health, specialising in plant virology and physiology, between 1999 and 2004.

== Career ==
=== Research and public administration ===
Bagabe began his career in agricultural research and plant health. By a Prime Minister's Order of 25 May 2005 he was appointed director of the Institut des Sciences Agronomiques du Rwanda (ISAR), the country's former national agricultural research institute, with effect from 5 April 2005.

He subsequently headed the national standards body – then the Rwanda Bureau of Standards, reconstituted in 2013 as the Rwanda Standards Board – which is responsible for standards development, conformity assessment and certification. He was in the post by October 2010, and moved from it to the country's agricultural research board in October 2016.

Bagabe headed the bureau during the adoption of Rwanda's national quality policy, which the cabinet approved in October 2010 to strengthen the country's quality infrastructure institutions, clarify their responsibilities and remove overlaps between them. The policy prompted a restructuring of the bureau over five years, then estimated to cost 30 billion Rwandan francs.

Bagabe was appointed director general of the Rwanda Agriculture and Animal Resources Development Board, the body responsible for agricultural research, development and extension services in Rwanda, with effect from 4 October 2016, and served in the post until January 2018. During his tenure the board developed the Smart Nkunganire System, a digital platform for administering Rwanda's agricultural input subsidy programme, in partnership with the technology company BK TecHouse. He afterwards worked as an international consultant, including for the International Trade Centre.

On 15 March 2024 the Office of the Prime Minister announced his appointment as director general of the Rwanda Inspectorate, Competition and Consumer Protection Authority, the agency responsible for market inspection, competition regulation and consumer protection. He held the post until his appointment to the cabinet that October.

=== Minister of Agriculture and Animal Resources ===
On 18 October 2024, President Paul Kagame appointed Bagabe Minister of Agriculture and Animal Resources. He succeeded Ildephonse Musafiri and took office at a handover ceremony on 21 October 2024.

On 6 December 2024, Bagabe launched Rwanda's Fifth Strategic Plan for Agriculture Transformation (PSTA5), covering the period 2024–2029, with a budget of 6,622.6 billion Rwandan francs (about US$5.1 million). The strategy set targets including average annual agricultural growth of 6.5 per cent, US$1.54 billion in agricultural export revenue and more than 644,000 new off-farm jobs in the agri-food sector. Describing the plan at its launch, Bagabe said it was "the first food systems and climate resilient centric strategy in our country" and that it was "designed as a tool and a roadmap to guide efforts at tackling the country's food systems challenges".

In February 2025 Bagabe delivered Rwanda's country statement to the forty-eighth session of the International Fund for Agricultural Development Governing Council in Rome, setting out the country's rural investment priorities under PSTA5.

On 18 June 2025 he launched Rwanda's Climate Smart Agriculture Investment Plan, prepared by the ministry with the Rwanda Green Fund and the International Finance Corporation. The plan identified 449.7 billion Rwandan francs (about US$335 million) of potential private-sector investment, with targets of making 83,250 hectares of farmland more resilient and linking 170,200 farmers and 375 companies to climate-smart finance. Bagabe said the plan was "in line with Rwanda's Strategic Plan for the Transformation of Agriculture (PSTA5) which aims to accelerate agricultural transformation through increased climate resilience, productivity, market access, and private sector investment".

Bagabe left office on 1 December 2025, when Kagame appointed Telesphore Ndabamenye, previously minister of state in the same ministry, to succeed him.

=== Later career ===
In May 2026 Bagabe was appointed country director for Rwanda of the World Agriculture Forum, an international body promoting sustainable agriculture, innovation and agricultural entrepreneurship.

== Other roles ==
Bagabe has served on the board of the Association for Strengthening Agricultural Research in Eastern and Central Africa (ASARECA), the council of the University of Rwanda and the board of the Institute of Policy Analysis and Research – Rwanda (IPAR-Rwanda).

In July 2026, at the tenth general assembly of the Forum for Agricultural Research in Africa, held in Abuja, Nigeria alongside the ninth Africa Agriculture Science Week, Bagabe was named chair of the FARA board for the 2026–2029 term.
