= Nsengiyumva =

Nsengiyumva is a surname. Notable people with this surname include:

- Fulgence Nsengiyumva, Rwandan politician
- Justin Nsengiyumva (born 1970/71), Rwandan banker and politician
- Roger Nsengiyumva, Rwandan actor
- Thaddée Nsengiyumva (1949-1994), Rwandan bishop
- Vincent Nsengiyumva (1936–1994), Rwandan prelate
