= Papa Abdoulaye Seck =

Senegalese politician (born 1965)

Professor Papa Abdoulaye Seck FAAS

Minister of Agriculture and Rural Equipment of Senegal
- In office 2 September 2013 – 5 April 2019
- President: Macky Sall
- Prime Minister: Aminata Toure; Mahammed Dionne
- Preceded by: Abdoulaye Balde
- Succeeded by: Moussa Balde

Personal details
- Born: 16 July 1955 (age 70) Dakar, French West Africa
- Party: Senegalese Democratic Party
- Children: Aida Seck (daughter); Ousmane Seck (son, deceased)
- Awards: Certificate of Recognition, FARA; Medal of Honor, CORAF/WECARD; TW Schultz Prize, ICAE; Order of Agricultural Merit (Knight); Legion of Honour (Knight); Senegal Order of Merit (Knight, Officer); National Order of the Lion (Knight, Officer)
- Scientific career
- Education: ICHEC Brussels Management School (Diploma); Université catholique de Louvain (PGR); University of Burgundy (PhD)
- Fields: Agriculture policy and strategy
- Institutions: Africa Rice Center; Forum for Agricultural Research in Africa; CORAF/WECARD; African Union Council for Research; Food and Agriculture Organization; Cheikh Anta Diop University
- Thesis: L'approvisionnement de Dakar et la filière des légumes frais au Sénégal: éléments de réflexion sur la définition d'une stratégie d'avenir (1989)

Papa Abdoulaye Seck (16 July 1955, Dakar) is a Senegalese politician and scholar. He was the Minister of Agriculture and Rural Equipment from 2013 to 2019.

== Early life and education ==
Papa Abdoulaye Seck was born on 16 July 1955 in Dakar, French West Africa. He obtained a Diploma from the ICHEC Brussels Management School, followed by a Postgraduate diploma from the Faculty of Agronomy, Université Catholique de Louvain. He completed his PhD in Agricultural Economic Analysis and Policies at the National School of Agronomy, University of Burgundy, in 1989.

== Career ==
In September 2015, visiting the Kolda region as Minister of Agriculture and Rural Equipment, he reaffirmed the State's commitment to supporting cotton producers by equipping them with agricultural equipment. In October 2015, he was convinced that Africa could export rice to Asia. In January 2016, according to him, “The evolution of the world recommends food independence”.

He has the title of Director of Research and has been a permanent member of the Senegal Academy of Sciences since 2005. Additionally, he serves on the advisory boards of many organisations, including the Strategic Orientation Council of Agreenium, France, and the Board of Trustees of the Forum for Agricultural Research in Africa (FARA). Seck served as the Director General of the Africa Rice Center (AfricaRice) between 2006 and 2013), a pan-African intergovernmental association and Research organization, in Abidjan, Côte d'Ivoire.

He previously held the positions of Director General of the Senegal Agricultural Research Institute, Technical Advisor to the Prime Minister of Senegal, Chair of FARA, Member of the Governing Board of the West and Central African Council for Research and Development (CORAF/WECARD), Trustee of the Africa Rice Board of Trustees, Member of the Executive Committee of the Global Forum for Agricultural Research, and Member of the African Union Council for Research.

Seck is an expert in researching and formulating agricultural policy and strategy, especially rice. He has written or co-written 80 publications, including articles, books, forewords to more than ten volumes, papers presented at international conferences with scientific committees, and articles. He has been an affiliate professor at Cheikh Anta Diop University since 2018. Seck was one of four worldwide experts the UN Secretary-General chose in 2009 to address Heads of State on the Millennium Development Goals. He is an Ambassador and Permanent Representative of Senegal to FAO.

== Awards and honours ==
Seck received the Certificate of Recognition from FARA in 2005, the United Nations Award for serving as the Director General of Africa Rice in 2006, the Medal of Honor from CORAF/WECARD in 2007, and the Award of Recognition from the Agriculture Ministry of Mali in 2010. At the 28th International Conference of Agricultural Economists, he shared the 2012 TW Schultz Prize for Best Contributed Paper.

Seck was Senegal's National Order of the Lion (Knight in 2005 and Officer in 2013) and Order of Merit (Knight in 2009 and Officer in 2010), and the French Order of Agricultural Merit (Knight) in 2009 and Legion of Honour (Knight) in 2013.

Seck was elected a Fellow of the African Academy of Sciences in 2012, and a Fellow of the Academy of Sciences of Senegal.

== Personal life ==
Seck is the father of four children. In September 2015, Aida Seck, his daughter, got married.

At the end of December 2015, Papa Abdoulaye Seck lost his father. A week later, the minister lost his son Ousmane Seck. Ousmane had been hit near the Léopold Sédar Senghor International Airport by the vehicle driven by Nicolas Dacosta, the nephew of Viviane Bampassy, Minister of the Civil Service, Staff Rationalization and Public Service Renewal. Seck granted his pardon to the young Nicolas Dacosta, but not without making him pay a fine of 206,000 CFA. The defendant acknowledged the facts of manslaughter and asked for forgiveness from the deceased's family.
