= Joshua Sikhu Okonya =

Ugandan author and agricultural research scientist

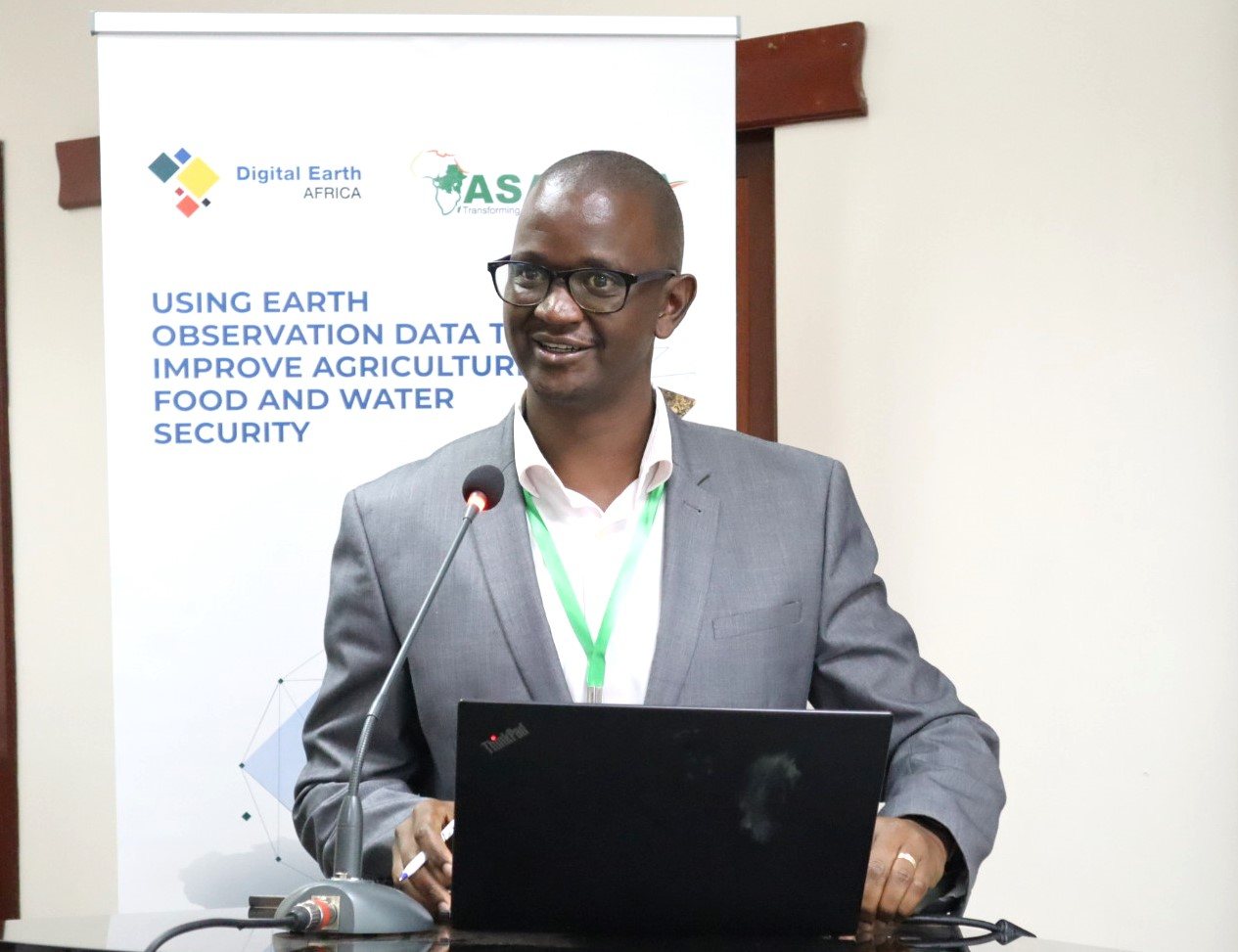
- Citizenship: Ugandan
- Education: Makerere University, Georg-August University in Goettingen, University of Hohenheim in Stuttgart, Germany,
- Occupations: Agronomist and author
- Employer: Association for Strengthening Agricultural Research in Eastern and Central Africa (ASARECA)
- Title: Program Officer for Technology and Innovation

Joshua Sikhu Okonya is a Ugandan author and an International agricultural research scientist. He is an Agronomist and a scholar who has made contributions to the body of knowledge in agriculture and the adaptation of African agricultural systems to climate change.

== Early life and education ==
Okonya attended Katuugo Primary School in Nakasongola District. He joined Masaba Secondary School in 1995 and Wanale View Secondary School in Mbale District. He finished his A-level from Caltec Academy in 1999. He then proceeded to Makerere University in Kampala, Uganda where he attained a Bachelor of Science second-class honours degree in Zoology and Botany in 2004. At Makerere University, he was a recipient of an undergraduate scholarship from the Government of Uganda and was attached to Lumumba Hall. He gained a foundation in Biological Sciences throughout his undergraduate studies, which he later paired with his interest in agricultural research.

In 2008, he attended Georg-August University in Goettingen, Germany where he obtained a Master of Science degree in Tropical and International Agriculture majoring in Agronomy and Crop protection. At Goettingen, he was a recipient of a postgraduate fellowship from Georg-August University and German Academic Exchange Service (DAAD).

In 2024, he graduated from the University of Hohenheim in Stuttgart, Germany where he obtained his PhD in Agricultural Sciences majoring in Applied Entomology and Climate change.

Okonya is an Agronomist and has been trained in insect ecology at International Centre of Insect Physiology and Ecology, Pest risk analysis at Fera Science, and CAB International, Phenology modelling and risk mapping at International Potato Center, climate-smart agriculture at The CGIAR Research Program on Climate Change, Agriculture and Food Security (CCAFS), Scientific Research Writing at INASP, Project Planning and Management at Makerere University and International Development Cooperation at University of Kassel.

== Career and professional life ==
Okonya worked as a Research assistant at International Institute of Tropical Agriculture from 2005 to 2008. During his time at IITA, he conducted research on the Biological pest control of the banana weevil Cosmopolites sordidus and nematodes. In 2010, he joined International Potato Center as a Research associate. At CIP, he coordinated several Agricultural Research for Development (AR4D) projects in Uganda, Rwanda and Burundi. In 2021, he was appointed Program Officer for Agricultural Technology and Innovation at the ASARECA Secretariat in Uganda.

Joshua has also done consulting work for various agricultural research for development organizations in Uganda, Germany and Netherlands. He is also a member of the ASARECA Climate Smart Agriculture Alliance, Gender Equity in Research Alliance, DAAD Alumni Working Group on Climate Change and Agriculture in Africa, Entomological Association of Uganda, African Crop Science Society, International Society for Tropical Root Crops (ISTRC), African Potato Association and AuthorAID.

=== Research ===
Okonya is a scholar in African agriculture with 65 articles and 811 citations by July 2023. Among his most cited articles are those on pesticide-handling practices, and related occupational risks among potato farmers in Uganda; Distribution of insect pests affecting potatoes; Indigenous knowledge of seasonal weather forecasting and Gender differences in access and use of selected productive resources among sweet potato farmers.

He was also part of the scientists who reported for the first time, the occurrence of the Potato Cyst nematode in Uganda. His research reported for the first time, presence of the Tobacco Rattle Virus in potatoes in sub-Saharan Africa. He contributed three chapters of the Pest Risk Atlas for Africa, the first Atlas with information on current and future agricultural pest risks under different climate scenarios. He was part of the team at CIP led by Dr. Robert Mwanga that received the 2016 World Food Prize for promoting the production, consumption, and use of biofortified crops (orange-fleshed sweet potato) to reduce malnutrition (Vitamin A deficiency).

Joshua's work in the control of RTB (Roots, Tubers, and Bananas)-critical pests and diseases under changing climatic conditions was one of his major contributions. He developed creative integrated pest control solutions using cutting-edge risk assessment, surveillance, and modeling tools to safeguard agricultural crops from potential dangers.

Additionally, he developed techniques for smallholder farmers to adapt to climate change and understood the relevance of indigenous knowledge in seasonal weather forecasting in his research. His academic writings, which included investigations into how farmers perceive and adapt to climate change, were well-recognized in the academic world and added to the corpus of knowledge in agricultural sciences.

== Selected publications ==
1. Potato Pest and Disease Management: Okonya has conducted studies and research on pest and disease management strategies in potato farming. His work addresses the challenges faced by potato farmers and explores environmentally friendly approaches to reduce the use of pesticides.
2. Gender Differences in Agriculture: One of Okonya's research focuses includes examining gender differences in access to and use of productive resources among sweet potato farmers. His studies shed light on gender dynamics within the agricultural sector and contribute to empowering women in food production and processing activities.
3. Serological Survey and Metagenomic Discovery of Potato Viruses
4. Okonya has been involved in a study investigating potato viruses in Rwanda and Burundi. The research aimed to identify the presence or absence of specific viruses in potato crops in sub-Saharan Africa, providing crucial insights for disease management and crop protection.
5. Satellite imagery to aid Uganda farmers boost yields by solving climate change challenges.
6. The role of sweet potatoes in Uganda following COVID-19.
7. Ugandan entomologist overcame barriers to publication with help from the AuthorAID network.
8. Determinants of Women's Decision-Making Power in Pest and Disease Management: Evidence From Uganda.
9. Experts worry that over use of pesticides is posing danger to human health.

== See also ==
- Association For Strengthening Agricultural Researcher in East and Central Africa(ASARECA)
- International Potato Center
