= Association for Strengthening Agricultural Research in Eastern and Central Africa =

Association for Strengthening Agricultural Research in Eastern and Central Africa (ASARECA)
- Abbreviation: ASARECA
- Formation: 1994; 32 years ago
- Headquarters: Plot 5 Mpigi Road, Entebbe, Uganda
- Region served: East And Central Africa
- Executive Director: Enock Warinda
- Website: asareca.org

The Association for Strengthening Agricultural Research in Eastern and Central Africa (ASARECA) is an organization aimed at advancing agricultural research and development in the Eastern and Central Africa region. Established in 1994, ASARECA brings together the National Agricultural Research Institutes from its ten member countries – Burundi, Democratic Republic of the Congo, Eritrea, Ethiopia, Kenya, Madagascar, Rwanda, Sudan, Tanzania, and Uganda.

== History and background ==
ASARECA was established in order to support and improve the effectiveness of agricultural research in the Eastern and Central African region. The organization was created through cooperation among the national agricultural research institutes of the member countries to address shared agricultural concerns. ASARECA has been promoting research and innovation for sustainable agriculture since it was founded.

== Mission and objectives ==
The main objective of ASARECA is to promote market-oriented agricultural research that boosts the region of Eastern and Central Africa's income creation, economic development, food security, and export competitiveness. To take advantage of size and scope economies, the organization attempts to strengthen regional cooperation in agricultural research. In addition to attending to the unique requirements and priorities of its member nations, ASARECA aims at promoting productive and sustainable agriculture.

== Research programs and activities ==
ASARECA conducts a range of research projects and initiatives that are centered on important theme areas. Crop enhancement, livestock production, resource management, climate change adaptation, and capacity building are some of them. By working together on research initiatives, ASARECA seeks to find creative answers to the region's agricultural problems and help farmers live better lives. Additionally, the group promotes knowledge sharing and technology transfer to speed up the adoption of agricultural advances. ASARECA, in partnership with five regional research institutions, launched a joint regional project in February 2012 to examine the trends in food prices across the East African region and use the data as a tool for forecasting and developing efficient food policies and strategies for the region.

== Partnerships and collaborations ==
To support agricultural research and development in Eastern and Central Africa, ASARECA works with a variety of regional and international partners. The association fosters collaboration and information exchange among these institutes by working closely with the National Agricultural Research Systems (NARS) of its member nations. In order to support its research programs and activities, ASARECA also collaborates with universities, development organizations, donor agencies, and other parties.

== Impact and achievements ==
ASARECA has contributed significantly to agricultural research and development in the Eastern and Central African region over the years. To increase agricultural production, food security, and revenue generation, the organization has encouraged the development of cutting-edge technologies, enhanced farming techniques, and policy proposals. As a result of their joint efforts, ASARECA has improved the region's access to markets, farming systems' ability to withstand shocks, and the management of its natural resources.

== Member Countries ==
ASARECA has 14 countries and is currently operating in the 14 member countries in East and Central Africa that include the following:

1. Uganda
2. Eritrea
3. Ethiopia
4. Kenya
5. Rwanda
6. Central African Republic
7. DR Congo
8. Tanzania
9. Cameroon
10. Congo
11. Madagascar
12. Sudan
13. Rwanda
14. Burundi

== See also ==
- Forum for Agricultural Research in Africa
- Regional Strategic Analysis and Knowledge Support System
- African Forum for Agricultural Advisory Services
