= African Forum for Agricultural Advisory Services =

- Abbreviation: AFAAS
- Formation: 2011
- Type: NGO
- Purpose: Agriculture
- Location: Africa
- Region served: Africa
- Members: 40 countries
- Official language: English, French, Arabic and Portuguese
- Executive Director: Dr. Silim Nahdy
- Key people: Adolphus Johnson; Board chairman Dr Jeff Mutimba; Vice chairman
- Website: Homepage; Virtual Platform

The African Forum for Agricultural Advisory Services (AFAAS) is an African organization for strengthening Agricultural Extension and Advisory Services (AEAS) in Africa. It operates within the framework of the Comprehensive Africa Agriculture Development Programme (CAADP), a venture of the African Union in the New Partnership for Africa's Development (NEPAD). AFAAS is an autonomous subsidiary of the Forum for Agricultural Research in Africa (FARA).

== Overview ==
AFAAS is the continental umbrella organization for strengthening national Agricultural Extension and Advisory Services (AEAS) in Africa. Each member country is ultimately expected to establish a Country Forum (CF) through which its activities are to be implemented.

The agricultural body has the mandate to implement the agricultural advisory services aspects of CAADP, a programme of the AU. CAADP has four pillars. AFAAS works in close collaboration with other continental and sub-regional bodies contributing to CAADP, most notably those in the areas of agricultural research, organizing farmers, and private sector involvement.

Cognisant of the fact that the African Union Commission (AUC) recommitted itself to enhancing the CAADP momentum by adopting the Malabo Declaration on Accelerated Agricultural Growth and Transformation for Shared Prosperity and Improved Livelihoods in June 2014, AFAAS reaffirmed its commitment to the cause by signing an MoU with the AUC in April 2015.

== History ==
The African Forum for Agricultural Advisory Services (AFAAS) was initially formed as the Sub-Saharan African Network on Agricultural Advisory Services (SSANAAS). The SSANAAS was created at the first Regional Networking Symposium on Innovations in Agricultural Advisory Services, which was held in Kampala, Uganda in October 2004. The initial member countries were Kenya, Malawi, Mali, Namibia, South Africa, Tanzania and Uganda.

The second Symposium was held in September 2006 in Kampala. It brought together the additional African countries of Eritrea, Ethiopia, Ghana, Mozambique, Nigeria, Rwanda and Zambia; this brought the total of participating member African countries to fourteen. At this Symposium, it was decided that the network should go beyond Sub-Saharan Africa (SSA) and include all of Africa. This changed its name to the African Forum for Agricultural Advisory Services, and AFAAS was consequentially legally set up as an NGO in Uganda and became the successor body to SSANAAS in 2011.

== Member Countries ==
AFAAS has 13 country offices and is currently operating in 40 countries, which includes:

1. Angola
2. Benin
3. Botswana
4. Burkina Faso
5. Burundi
6. Cameroon
7. Central African Republic
8. DR Congo
9. Egypt
10. Eritrea
11. Ethiopia
12. Gabon
13. Gambia
14. Ghana
15. Ivory Coast
16. Kenya
17. Liberia
18. Mali
19. Madagascar
20. Malawi
21. Mauritania
22. Mozambique
23. Namibia
24. Nigeria
25. Congo
26. Rwanda
27. Senegal
28. Seychelles
29. Sierra Leone
30. Somalia
31. South Africa
32. South Sudan
33. Sudan
34. Swaziland
35. Tanzania
36. Togo
37. Uganda
38. Zambia
39. Zimbabwe

=== Country Fora ===
AFAAS supports the emergence of associations of AEAS stakeholders under a common umbrella where they can identify, from among the issues that AFAAS has to address, priority areas of concern that can be addressed through collaborative information sharing, joint activities and partnerships. The CF are necessary to enable AAS actors to relate to each other within a framework of a set of agreed principles, rules and well defined roles and responsibilities. AFAAS' Country Fora are established in 13 of the 40 member countries.

Regional fora establishment

The West and Central Africa Network Agricultural and Rural Advisory Services (RESCAR-AOC) regional forum was formally launched during a workshop held in Abidjan, Côte d'Ivoire in February 2015. This was organized by CORAF in collaboration with AFAAS, GFRAS, and ANADER, and had 70 participants.

Southern Africa Regional Forum for Agricultural Advisory Services (SARFAAS) Interim Steering Committee (ISC) members met in Johannesburg in April, 2014.

== Projects ==
IFAD Project 1

The International Fund for Agricultural Development (IFAD) provided a grant to AFAAS to help implement its strategic plan of establishing Country Fora in five countries (Burkina Faso, Malawi, Mozambique, Sierra Leone and Uganda) and their knowledge management and information sharing mechanisms within the framework of the AFAAS strategic plan. The project's two interrelated components are:

- Establishing Country Fora
- Communication, Information and Knowledge Management (CIKM) for Agricultural Extension and Advisory Services (AEAS) Innovation.

Postharvest Management in Sub-Saharan Africa (PHM-SSA) project

This project is coordinated by HELVETAS Swiss Intercooperation (HSI) and implemented in a consortium of FANRPAN (Food, Agriculture and Natural Resources Policy Analysis Network), with AFAAS and AGRIDEA as further partners.

Phase 1 started in April 2013 and ended in December 2017. The project was localised in two pilot countries: Republic of Benin: communities in departments of Atacora (North) and Savalou (South) and Mozambique: communities in Northern provinces of Nampula and Cabo Delgado.

The project aims to improve the food security of smallholder farmers in SSA through reduction of post-harvest losses of food crops (grains and pulses) by addressing major constraining factors of technology dissemination and adoption, knowledge and information sharing, rural advisory services (RAS) and policies related to PHM.

The project's interventions focus on two levels:

- Validation and promotion of PHM practices and systems at rural household and communities level through use of innovative RAS and private sector linkages,
- Linking national and regional level through active promotion of sharing and learning, capacity-building, and advocacy and policy dialogue related to PHM.

== Partner Organizations ==
AFAAS cohorts with the following and other organizations in fulfilling its mandates:

1. The World Bank
2. European Union
3. The Technical Centre for Agricultural and Rural Cooperation ACP-EU (CTA)
4. The Forum for Agricultural Research in Africa (FARA)
5. The Global Forum for Rural Advisory Services (GFRAS)
6. The International Fund for Agricultural Development (IFAD)
7. The Food and Agriculture Organization (FAO)
8. ASARECA
9. The Alliance for a Green Revolution in Africa (AGRA)
10. The New Partnership for Africa's Development Planning and Coordinating Agency (NEPAD Agency)
11. The International Centre for development oriented Research in Agriculture (ICRA)
12. The World Agroforestry Centre (ICRAF)
13. Rescar AOC
14. The African Network for Agriculture, Agroforestry and Natural Resources Education (ANAFE)
15. African Union Commission
16. The European Initiative on Agricultural Research for Development (EIARD)
17. GIZ
18. HELVETAS Swiss Intercooperation
19. Access Agriculture

== See also ==
Agribusiness
