= NEPAD African Western and Southern Networks of Centres of Excellence in Water Sciences =

- Formation: 2009
- Type: International Network Research
- Purpose: Strengthening Research and development capacity in water and science in Africa
- Headquarters: Southern Network: Stellenbosch, South Africa; Western Network: Dakar, Senegal
- Parent organization: New Partnership for Africa's Development
- Affiliations: United Nations Environment Programme

The NEPAD African Western and Southern Networks of Centres of Excellence in Water Sciences are international collaborations between teams of researchers working in different parts of southern and Western Africa on the economic development of local water resources. The southern network of nine centres is coordinated from the University of Stellenbosch in Cape Town, South Africa, the western network of five centres from the University of Cheikh Anta Diop in Dakar, Senegal.

== Definition of Centre of Excellence by the United Nations Environment Programme (UNEP) ==
Centres of Excellence are physical or virtual centres focused on specific issues. They concentrate on existing capabilities and resources to encourage collaboration across disciplines and across organisations on long term programmes and projects directly relevant to human needs and aspirations. By definition, Centres of Excellence are widely known for their work.

== Framework of the initiative ==
The New Partnership for Africa's Development (NEPAD) "explicitly recognizes that Africa’s economic renewal and sustainable development will not be achieved without effective and efficient research and development (R&D) institutions.” NEPAD, therefore, launched a programme specifically to identify and reinforce R&D capacities in Africa through building regional networks of Centres of Excellence in water sciences. The program is in line with Africa's Science and Technology Consolidated Plan of Action (CPA). The specific goals for water sciences (p. 28 of the CPA) are:

- to improve conservation and utilization of the continent's water resources;
- to improve the quality and the quantity of water available to rural and urban households;
- to strengthen national and regional capacities for water resources management and reduce impacts of water related disasters; and
- to enlarge the range of technologies for water supply and improve access to affordable quality water.

Calls of interest were launched and proposals evaluated in both the Southern African and Western African regions to identify and appoint Centres of Excellences in water sciences. Two regional networks were set up in 2009. The existing networks may be further expanded.

== Southern African Centres of Excellence network ==
Coordinator of the network is the University of Stellenbosch, South Africa.

=== Actual members of the southern African network ===
- Stellenbosch University (South Africa)
- International Center for Water Economics and Governance in Africa (Mozambique)
- KwaZulu-Natal University (South Africa)
- Western Cape University (South Africa)
- University of Malawi (Malawi)
- University of Zambia (Zambia)
- University of Botswana (Botswana)
- Council for Scientific and Industrial Research (South Africa)
- Polytechnic of Namibia (Namibia)

== Western African Centres of Excellence network ==
The coordinator is the Doctoral School on Water of the University of Cheikh Anta Diop, Senegal.

=== Actual members of the western African network ===
- University of Cheikh Anta Diop (Senegal)
- International Institute for Water and Environmental Engineering (Burkina Faso)
- University of Benin (Nigeria)
- National Water Resources Institute (Nigeria)
- Kwame Nkrumah University of Science and Technology (Ghana)
