= Ministry of Agriculture and Animal Resources =

Government ministry of Rwanda

- Minisiteri y'Ubuhinzi n'Ubworozi
- Emblem of Rwanda

Agency overview
- Jurisdiction: Government of Rwanda
- Headquarters: KG 569 Street, Kigali; 1°56′25.72″S 30°5′18.46″E
- Minister responsible: Telesphore Ndabamenye, Minister of Agriculture and Animal Resources
- Deputy Minister responsible: Solange Uwituze, Minister of State for Agriculture and Animal Resources
- Agency executive: Olivier Kamana, Permanent Secretary
- Website: www.minagri.gov.rw

The Ministry of Agriculture and Animal Resources (MINAGRI) is the ministry of the Government of Rwanda in charge of agriculture and livestock. Its aim is a modern and competitive farming sector that ensures food security.

The ministry is based in Kigali. Since December 2025, the minister has been Telesphore Ndabamenye. He is assisted by a Minister of State, Solange Uwituze.

== Role ==
The ministry promotes the sustainable development of agriculture and livestock. It aims to ensure food security and to increase agricultural exports. It also encourages more diverse production. Its work follows the National Agricultural Policy of 2018. The policy is carried out through the fifth Strategic Plan for the Transformation of Agriculture (PSTA5).

The headquarters are on KG 569 Street in Kigali. The Permanent Secretary, Olivier Kamana, has been in office since January 2023.

== Ministers ==
The minister is appointed by the President of Rwanda.

- Telesphore Ndabamenye (since December 2025)
- Mark Cyubahiro Bagabe (October 2024 – December 2025)
- Ildephonse Musafiri (2023 – October 2024)
- Gérardine Mukeshimana (2014–2023)
- Agnes Kalibata (2009–2014)

=== Ministers of State ===
- Solange Uwituze (since December 2025)

== See also ==
- Cabinet of Rwanda
- Economy of Rwanda
