= Board for International Food and Agricultural Development =

Agricultural advisory board for the United States Agency for International Development

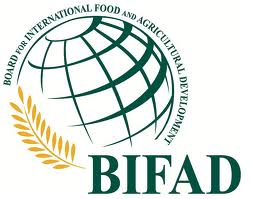

Agency overview
- Formed: 1975
- Headquarters: Washington, D.C.
- Agency executives: Laurence B. Alexander, Chair; Pamela K. Anderson, Board member; Mary Boyd, Board member; Rattan Lal, Board member; Saweda Liverpool-Tasie, Board member; Henri G. Moore, Board member; Kathy Spahn, Board member
- Website: www.usaid.gov/bifad

The Board for International Food and Agricultural Development (BIFAD) advises the United States Agency for International Development (USAID) on issues concerning agriculture, higher education in developing countries, and food insecurity. BIFAD was established and recognized by Title XII of the Foreign Assistance Act, and both the BIFAD board and Title XII recognize the critical role of U.S. land-grant institutions in food and agricultural security, domestically and abroad. BIFAD consists of seven board members appointed by the White House, four of whom must have been part of the US Academic community. The board's mission is to draw on the expertise and scientific knowledge of those in higher education to advise the US international assistance on the effect of domestic efforts to end food insecurity.

== History ==
BIFAD was created by USAID in 1975, under Title XII (Famine Prevention and Freedom from Hunger) of the Foreign Assistance Act. Title XII itself was passed in Congress to address the global issues of food insecurity and hunger. Title XII highlighted the benefits of increased involvement of US Universities in agriculture, the need for developing countries to have trained people and thriving local institutions that can adapt to local needs, and how increased focus and efforts in agriculture can benefit both the US and other countries. BIFAD was also tasked with the formulation of basic policy, procedures, and criteria for project proposal review, selection, and monitoring, as noted in the Foreign Assistance Act of 1961. BIFAD is the only presidentially appointed board that assists the Administrator of USAID in developing and implementing the official U.S. foreign assistance programs.

== Challenges and strategies ==
BIFAD believes that the current global challenges in terms of poverty and food insecurity are the current 800 million people suffering from chronic hunger, the 2 billion people affected by micronutrient deficiency, the 700 million people living in extreme poverty, and the growth in global population estimated to reach 9.7 billion by 2050, with growth occurring disproportionately in Africa and Asia. Challenges facing the production of foodstuffs include the threat of new strains of pathogens, dropping water tables, and a changing climate. In order to address these problems food production will need to dramatically increase with limited resources, usage of land and water will need to improve, and disease and insect-resistant crops will need to be developed.

== Past and present board members ==
Year	Chairman	Board Member	Board Member	Board Member	Board Member	Board Member	Board Member
1976	Dr. Clifton R. Wharton Jr.						
1977	Dr. Clifton R. Wharton Jr.						
1978	Dr. Clifton R. Wharton Jr.	Dr. Johnnie Watts Prothro	Dr. Orville G. Bentley	Dr. Anson R. Bertrand	Mr. Charles Krause	Mr. Peter McPherson	Dr. Gerald W. Thomas
1979	Dr. Clifton R. Wharton Jr.	Dr. Johnnie Watts Prothro	Dr. Orville G. Bentley	Mr. David Garst	Dr. Rebecca Robbins Polland	Mr. Peter McPherson	Dr. Gerald W. Thomas
1980	Dr. Clifton R. Wharton Jr.	Dr. Johnnie Watts Prothro	Dr. Orville G. Bentley*	Mr. David Garst	Dr. Rebecca Robbins Polland	Mr. Peter McPherson*	Dr. Gerald W. Thomas*
1981	Dr. Clifton R. Wharton Jr.	Dr. Johnnie Watts Prothro	Dr. C. Peter Magrath	Mr. David Garst	Dr. Rebecca Robbins Polland	Dr. E. T. York	Dr. H. F. Robinson
1982	Dr. Clifton R. Wharton Jr.	Dr. Johnnie Watts Prothro*	Dr. C. Peter Magrath	Mr. David Garst*	Dr. Rebecca Robbins Polland	Dr. E. T. York	Dr. H. F. Robinson
1983	Dr. Clifton R. Wharton Jr.*	Mr. Ernest T. Marshall	Dr. C. Peter Magrath	Mr. Daryl Arnold	Mr. Charles J. Marshall	Dr. E. T. York**	Dr. H. F. Robinson
1984	Dr. E. T. York	Mr. Ernest T. Marshall	Dr. Benjamin F. Payton	Dr. Duane C. Acker	Mr. Charles J. Marshall	Hon. Paul Fidley	Dr. Warren J. Baker
1985	Dr. E. T. York	Mr. Ernest T. Marshall*	Dr. Benjamin F. Payton	Dr. Duane C. Acker	Mr. Charles J. Marshall	Hon. Paul Fidley	Dr. Warren J. Baker
1986	Dr. E. T. York*	Mr. L. William McNutt Jr.	Dr. Benjamin F. Payton	Dr. Duane C. Acker	Mr. Charles J. Marshall*	Hon. Paul Fidley	Dr. Warren J. Baker
1987	Dr. William E. Lavery	Mr. L. William McNutt Jr.	Dr. Hugh LaBounty	Dr. Leonard Spearman	Dr. Jean Ruley Kearns	Hon. Paul Fidley	Dr. Leo Walsh
1988	Dr. William E. Lavery	Mr. L. William McNutt Jr.*	Dr. Hugh LaBounty	Dr. Leonard Spearman*	Dr. Jean Ruley Kearns	Hon. Paul Fidley	Dr. Leo Walsh
1989	Dr. William E. Lavery*	Dr. Wendell G. Rayburn	Dr. Hugh LaBounty	Mrs. Gwendolyn S. King	Dr. Jean Ruley Kearns	Hon. Paul Fidley	Dr. Leo Walsh
1990	Mr. Wales H. Madden Jr.	Dr. Wendell G. Rayburn	Dr. Hugh LaBounty	Mr. Christopher Hicks	Dr. Jean Ruley Kearns	Hon. Paul Fidley	Dr. Leo Walsh
1991	Mr. Wales H. Madden Jr.	Dr. Wendell G. Rayburn	Dr. Hugh LaBounty*	Mr. Christopher Hicks	Dr. Jean Ruley Kearns*	Hon. Paul Fidley	Dr. Leo Walsh
1992	Mr. Wales H. Madden Jr.	Dr. Wendell G. Rayburn	Dr. John Byrne	Mr. Christopher Hicks	Dr. John DiBiaggio	Hon. Paul Fidley	
1993	Mr. Wales H. Madden Jr.	Dr. Wendell G. Rayburn*	Dr. John Byrne*		Dr. John DiBiaggio*		
1994	Mr. Wales H. Madden Jr.						
1995	Dr. Edward Schuh						
1996	Dr. Edward Schuh						
1997	Dr. Edward Schuh						
1998	Dr. Edward Schuh						
1999	Dr. Edward Schuh						
2000	Dr. Edward Schuh						
2001	Dr. Edward Schuh*						
2002	Peter McPherson	William Delauder	Carol Lewis	Anthony G. Laos	Micheal Deegan	Sharron Quisenberry	Stewart Iverson Jr.
2003	Peter McPherson	William Delauder	Carol Lewis	Anthony G. Laos	Micheal Deegan	Sharron Quisenberry	Stewart Iverson Jr.
2004	Peter McPherson	William Delauder	Carol Lewis	Anthony G. Laos	Micheal Deegan	Sharron Quisenberry	Stewart Iverson Jr.
2005	Peter McPherson	William Delauder	Carol Lewis	Anthony G. Laos	Micheal Deegan	Sharron Quisenberry	Stewart Iverson Jr.
2006	Peter McPherson	William Delauder	Allen Christensen	Anthony G. Laos	Micheal Deegan	Sharron Quisenberry	Stewart Iverson Jr.
2007	Robert Easter	William Delauder	Allen Christensen	Timothy Rabon	Catherine Bertini	H. H. Barlow III	John Thomas
2008	Robert Easter	William Delauder	Allen Christensen	Timothy Rabon	Catherine Bertini	H. H. Barlow III	Keith W. Eckel
2009	Robert Easter	William Delauder	Allen Christensen	Timothy Rabon	Catherine Bertini	H. H. Barlow III	Keith W. Eckel
2010	Robert Easter	William Delauder	Gebisa Ejeta	Timothy Rabon	Catherine Bertini	H. H. Barlow III	Elsa Murano
2011	Brady Deaton	William Delauder	Gebisa Ejeta	Marty McVey	Catherine Bertini	Jo Luck	Elsa Murano
2012	Brady Deaton	William Delauder	Gebisa Ejeta	Marty McVey	Catherine Bertini	Jo Luck	Elsa Murano
2013	Brady Deaton	Harold Martin Sr.	Gebisa Ejeta	Marty McVey	Catherine Bertini	Waded Cruzado	*Vacant*
2014	Brady Deaton	Harold Martin Sr.	Gebisa Ejeta	Marty McVey	Catherine Bertini	Waded Cruzado	*Vacant*
2015	Brady Deaton	Harold Martin Sr.	Gebisa Ejeta	Marty McVey	Catherine Bertini	Waded Cruzado	Cary Fowler
2016	Brady Deaton	Harold Martin Sr.	Gebisa Ejeta	James Ash	Pamela Anderson	Waded Cruzado	Cary Fowler
2017	Brady Deaton	Harold Martin Sr.	Gebisa Ejeta	James Ash	Pamela Anderson	Waded Cruzado	Cary Fowler
2018	Mark E. Keenum	Brady Deaton	Gebisa Ejeta	James Ash	Pamela Anderson	Waded Cruzado	Richard Lackey

*Member left partway through the year

**Member became Chairman

== Events and meetings ==
=== Haiti taskforce ===
One of BIFAD's goals, after its creation, was to determine the role higher education Institutions could have in agricultural development. As such, after the 2010 earthquake in Haiti, BIFAD organised a task force to see what role Title XII agricultural Universities and other public land-grant institutions could have in the reconstruction of Haiti. Approved in January 2010, the task force was organised through several conference calls during the month of February, and developed the goal "to develop recommendations for BIFAD to deliver to the USAID Administrator regarding long-term Haiti reconstruction and regional development; and the role of land-grant universities in this." One idea for Universities to help with Haiti's reconstruction was to host students whose institution had been destroyed by the earthquake, so that they could continue or finish their studies without disturbances. The task force met in person in March to set realistic expectations with a focus on long-term thinking of a vision for Haiti.

=== Afghanistan agricultural strategy ===
BIFAD, in coordination with the Association of Public and Land-grant Universities (APLU) held a meeting on the US agricultural strategy in Afghanistan. Attending were representatives from the United States Department of Agriculture (USDA), the US Agency for International Development (USAID), the State Department, the U.S. Central Command, the National Guard Bureau and the U.S. Marine Corp, and 21 representatives of Title XII institutions. The discussion concerned the institutional development of the Ministry of Agriculture in Afghanistan. With 80% of Afghanistan's population depending on agriculture, BIFAD and its US partners saw this development as essential to prevent insurgencies, create employment opportunities, and develop of the country. After the meeting, a working group with representatives form the USDA, USAID, and Universities was created to continue meeting regularly to discuss what could be done for Agricultural "research, learning and extension competencies in Afghanistan to develop strategies and opportunities to expand long-term training."

=== Board meetings ===
The BIFAD Board meets several times per year with the representatives from key institutions (USAID, APLU), ecetera and land grant universities to discuss the ongoing projects and most important topics concerning agriculture and education. As of July 2014, there have been 166 BIFAD meetings. The topics since 1975 have included humanitarian relief, agriculture and nutrition, global food prices, sustainability, the Feed the Future Initiative, African higher education, human and institutional capacity development, and many other subjects that revolove around education, agriculture, and domestic or international concerns.

== Past projects ==
=== Borlaug Higher Education Research and Development Program ===
In June 2011, the US Agency for International Development (USAID) launched a new set of programs called the Borlaug 21st Century Leadership Program honouring the legacy of Nobel Peace Prize Laureate Norman Borlaug. This initiative is a major new effort to train individuals and strengthening the public and private institutions of developing countries, enabling them to take advantage of scientific and technological breakthroughs to promote innovation across the agricultural sector. BIFAD was asked to help establish one of the programs within the broader Borlaug 21st Century Leadership Program, called the Feed the Future Borlaug Higher Education Agricultural Research and Development Program (BHEARD).

=== Feed the Future Research Forum ===
In May 2011, Feed the Future (FtF) held a forum that placed a major emphasis on research, technological development, policies, and a "whole government" approach to ending world hunger. The forum would help Feed the Future identify research opportunities combat global hunger. USAID and USDA partnered with the Association of Public and Land-grant Universities (APLU) and the Board on International Food and Agricultural Development (BIFAD) to consult on a process for engaging the US and international research communities to respond to the strategy and to identify research opportunities that support Feed the Future's research goals. An initial workshop was held at Purdue University in January 2011 to set the context for the discussion and outline a process. In May 2011 an e-consultation was held, followed by a stakeholder forum, convened in Washington DC in June 2011. This consultative process was designed to allow research stakeholders to further refine research priorities and identify opportunities for new ways of working in order to inform Feed the Future's research implementation efforts.

=== Africa-U.S. Higher Education Initiative ===
In July 2007, BIFAD and USAID along with a number of groups based in the United States and Africa came together to consider what could be done to assist in strengthening African higher education's capacity to educate and solve problems relevant to national and regional development. These meetings resulted in an initiative to strengthen the capacity of African higher education through partnerships between African and U.S. higher education institutions. The principal goal of the initiative was to facilitate deeper and more effective partnerships between African and U.S. institutes of higher education with a focus on contributing more effectively to key priority development areas such as science and technology, agriculture, environment and natural resources, engineering, business, management and economics, health, and education and teacher training.

== Award for Scientific Excellence ==
=== 2012 ===
Jim Simon of Rutgers University was chosen as a winner of the 2012 BIFAD Award for Scientific Excellence. He was chosen for his work in agricultural research and training programs in Sub-Saharan Africa. He created agricultural jobs for women and disabled individuals along with creating new markets for them to access. He has helped decrease food-insecurity for high-risk groups.

Gerardine Mukeshimana of Michigan State University was chosen as a winner of the 2012 BIFAD Award for Scientific Excellence. She was chosen for her work in breeding the common pear to be both drought tolerant and disease resistant in her home country of Rwanda. She has also identified the key components of bean genetic inheritance, including drought-resistant mechanisms, and has developed a fast and cost-effective method for screening these components. Her work has led to increasing crop productivity and a decrease in food insecurity in the region.

=== 2014 ===
Rangaswamy Muniappan of Virginia Tech was chosen as a winner of the 2014 BIFAD Award for Scientific Excellence. He was chosen for his research into a biological control of the papaya mealybug which has brought about economic benefits of between $500 million - $1.3 billion. Dr. Rangaswamy has also been credited with the development of biological controls for the pink hibiscus mealybug, the fruit-piercing moth, the red coconut scale, the banana weevil, and the Asian cycad scale. His research has led to an increase in crop profitability and food security, while also lowering the usage of pesticides protecting both farmers and the surrounding environment.

Kelsey Barale was chosen as a winner of the 2014 BIFAD Award for Scientific Excellence. She was chosen for her work in understanding how agricultural information can best be communicated to farmers, particularly disadvantaged women and smallholder farmers. Her work has led to effective communication about farmer needs and improved and sustainable farming practices, increasing food security in many developing countries.

Elana Peach-Fine was chosen as a winner of the 2014 BIFAD Award for Scientific Excellence. She was chosen for her work in with the Horticulture Collaborative Research Support Program (Horticulture CRSP) along with other work scaling up agricultural practices in developing countries. Her work has helped decease rates of food insecurity.

=== 2015 ===
Dr. Larry L. Murdock of Purdue University was chosen as a winner of the 2015 BIFAD Award for Scientific Excellence. He was chosen for his research into cow pea production and storage which has helped many resource-poor farmers in Africa cut losses of harvest peas to weevils down to virtually zero. His work led to the evolved hermetic three-bag storage technology now in widespread use in Africa which has led to increased grain value, lowered pesticide use, and has created a new micro-credit market using grain as collateral. Overall Dr. Murdork's research has led in the decrease of food insecurity and poverty in the region.

D. Layne Coppock of Utah State University and Dr. Getachew Gebru of MARIL PLC in Addis Ababa, Ethiopia, were chosen as winners of the 2015 BIFAD Award for Scientific Excellence. Their team was chosen for their work in Pastoral Risk Management (PARIMA) Project where they focused on ways to diversify income, assets, and improve access to information among primarily female pastoralists through micro-loans. Their research led to an increase in income in communities along with the introduction of women into the workforce.

=== 2016 ===
The team of Micheal Carter, Christopher Barrett, and Andrew Mude were chosen as winners of the 2016 BIFAD Award for Scientific Excellence. They were chosen based on their research on which pioneered new solutions on how to deal with the issues of chronic poverty and food insecurity. Much of the research can be applied to policy and has already been implemented in parts of Kenya and Ethiopia, where it is aiding in decreasing food insecurity and chronic poverty.

Daljit Singh of Kansas State University was chosen as a winner of the 2016 BIFAD Award for Scientific Excellence. He was chosen for his work in applied wheat genomics to develop a heat-tolerant, high-yield, and farmer-accepted varieties for South Asia. This development of new wheat strains will aid in ending food insecurity in the region and will aid in increasing the income of farming communities.

=== 2017 ===
James Beaver of the University of Puerto Rico and Juan Calos Rosas of the Zamorano Panamerican Agricultural University in Honduras were chosen as winners for the 2017 BIFAD Award for Scientific Excellence. They have been recognized for their work in the breeding of disease-resistant, drought-tolerant, and heat-tolerant varieties of common beans. The team has developed more than 60 cultivars with increased yield, quality, and stability throughout Central America., along with 23 bean lines and germplasm resistant to Bean Golden Yellow Mosaic Virus, Bean Common Mosaic Virus, and Bean Common Mosaic Necrosis. Dr. Beaver and Dr. Rosas collaborative research has directly improved the incomes and food security of smallholder farmers across the Central America.

Laouali Amadou of the University of Niger was chosen as a winner of the 2017 BIFAD Award for Scientific Excellence. His work with parasitoids as a way to control pests, mainly the Niger's pearl millet head miner which causes hundreds of millions of dollars in crop damages each year. This innovative solution was chosen due to its usage of naturally occurring parasitoids to control the population of the millet head miner which unlike pesticides is environmentally sustainable and does not negatively impact the farmers that use them.

=== 2018 ===
Dr. Hillary Egna of the Oregon State University was selected as the winner of the 2018 BIFAD Award for Scientific Excellence as a senior researcher. She was recognized for work to address the critical production constraint of feed costs in aquaculture enterprises. The researcher was supported by the Feed the Future AquaFish Innovation Lab.

Mr. Mohammad Mokhlesur Rahman of Kansas State University was chosen as a winner of the 2018 BIFAD Award for Scientific Excellence as a graduate student. He was recognized for his pivotal role in establishing Bangladesh's largest wheat testing nursery, where over 1,800 candidate lines have been tested. This has helped identify promising heat-tolerant varieties for the country's wheat farmers. Mr. Rahman's work was supported by the Feed-the-Future Innovation Lab for Applied Wheat Genomics at Kansas State University. He was also a fellow with the Borlaug Higher Education for Agricultural Research and Development (BHEARD) Program, funded by USAID and administered by Michigan State University.

=== 2019 ===
Drs. Yihun Dile, Abeyou Worqlul, and Jean-Claude Bizimana of Texas A&M University were selected for the 2019 BIFAD Award for Scientific Excellence. They have been recognized for their work in developing the Integrated Decision Support System, which is an analytical systems that assesses the production, environmental, economic, and nutritional consequences of the introduction of multiple small-scale irrigation systems in three countries in sub-Saharan Africa. The researchers were supported by the Feed the Future Innovation Lab for Small-Scale Irrigation at the Norman Borlaug Institute for International Agriculture at Texas A&M AgriLife.

Jean Baptiste Ndahetuye was the recipient of the 2019 BIFAD award for Scientific Excellence as a graduate student. Mr. Ndahetuye is a lecturer at the University of Rwanda and is completing a doctoral degree from the Swedish University of Agricultural Sciences. Mr. Ndahetuye was recognized for his research on milk production practices and udder health—both of which have impacted milk quality, safety and processability in Rwanda. His work was supported by the Feed the Future Innovation Lab for Livestock Systems at the University of Florida Institute of Food and Agricultural Sciences.

== Modes of assistance ==
=== Higher education as an engine of opportunity and enabler of development ===
According to BIFAD the higher education community is vital to the advancement of agricultural and food security, along with economic and social development, by teaching the next generation of farmers and scientists how to solve problems and overcome challenges related to food security BIFAD and USAID have increased food security in regions that need it the most. BIFAD and USAID have invested $2.8 billion (financial year of 2011 through the financial year of 2016) into higher education globally.

=== Global distribution of investment at higher education intuitions ===
By supporting the global distribution of higher education BIFAD is hoping to increase the global level of food security. USAID and BIFAD have directly invested over $86 million (fiscal year of 2016) into foreign higher education. A total of 50 higher education institutions in 33 counties received the funding: 21 institutions in 11 sub-Saharan African countries, 4 institutions of in 3 countries in the Middle East and North Africa, 9 institutions in 6 Asian countries, 8 institutions in 6 European countries, 2 institutions in Australia, 2 institutions in Central America and Canada, and 4 institutions in South America and the Caribbean.

=== Distribution of investments at U.S. higher education institutions ===
USAID and BIFAD invested more the $334 million in U.S. institutions of higher education supporting food and agriculture security. An additional $48 million (2016) was given to U.S. institutions of higher education in other grants and contracts.

=== Feed the Future Innovation Labs ===
USAID and BIFAD supported a total of 24 Feed the Future Innovation Labs that used the expertise of 79 different colleges and universities around the country. Feed the Future in cooperation with top U.S. universities and developing countries research and develop solutions to tackle challenges in agriculture, food security, and nutrition where it is needed most.

=== Training experiences delivered by U.S. Universities ===
USAID and BIFAD have a long history of training foreign students at U.S. institutions of higher education. A total of 1,593 degree-seeking individuals were supported (2016) at institutions around the globe: 48% at U.S. institutions of higher education and another 5% were U.S. citizens working with Feed the Future Innovation Labs. Of the 1,593 individuals, the majority sought degrees in agriculture followed by, education, social science, business, science, math, medicine, public health, arts, and humanities (2016).

=== Organisational capacity development assisted by U.S. Universities ===
USAID and BIFAD along with other donors have invested in the strengthening of agricultural education and training to enable partner countries to develop a work force that is responsive to local and regional challenges.

=== Youth: The Next Generation of Food Producers ===
According to BIFAD the world's changing demographics require a greater focus on preparing youth for a productive future, BIFAD and USAID have thus invested in strengthening youth programming and has begun to integrate youth issues into their programs.

=== U.S. Distribution of investments ===
USAID and BIFAD have invested over $334 million in higher education in six main categories. Health programming received the largest portion of funding, followed by economic growth, education, governance, program design, and disaster readiness (2016). Health was broken down into 9 sub-categories, HIV and AIDS received the largest portion of health funding followed by family planning and reproductive health, malaria, maternal and child health, water and sanitation, tuberculosis, emerging threats, other public health issues.

== See also ==
- Association of Public and Land-grant Universities (APLU)
- Food and Agricultural Organization (FAO)
- International Fund for Agricultural Development (IFAD)
- World Food Programme (WFP)
