= Ministry of Trade and Industry (Rwanda) =

Government ministry of Rwanda

- Emblem of Rwanda

Ministry overview
- Jurisdiction: Government of Rwanda
- Headquarters: Kigali
- Minister responsible: Antoine-Marie Kajangwe, Minister of Trade and Industry
- Website: www.minicom.gov.rw

The Ministry of Trade and Industry (MINICOM) is a ministry of the Government of Rwanda. It is in charge of developing trade and industry.

The ministry is also in charge of cooperatives, investment and consumer rights. Since June 2026, the Minister of Trade and Industry has been Antoine-Marie Kajangwe.

== Mandate ==
The mission of MINICOM is to lead the development of domestic and external trade. It also develops competitive companies and cooperatives. It promotes investment and consumer rights.

The main responsibilities of MINICOM are:

- drafting, disseminating and coordinating trade and industry policies, strategies and programmes;
- regulating the trade and industry sector;
- building the capacity of institutions and staff in trade and industry;
- monitoring and evaluating the policies and strategies of the sector;
- supervising the institutions under its authority;
- mobilising resources to implement programmes;
- negotiating trade agreements with other countries to advance the interests of Rwanda.

== Ministers ==
Jean-Chrysostome Ngabitsinze led MINICOM from 2022. In August 2024, Prudence Sebahizi replaced him. Before that, Sebahizi worked at the Secretariat of the African Continental Free Trade Area (AfCFTA) in Accra, Ghana.

On 10 June 2026, Antoine-Marie Kajangwe replaced Sebahizi. Before that, Kajangwe was Permanent Secretary of the ministry.

== See also ==
- Economy of Rwanda
- Cabinet of Rwanda
