= Nardos Bekele-Thomas =

Ethiopian economist and professor (born 1958 or 1959)

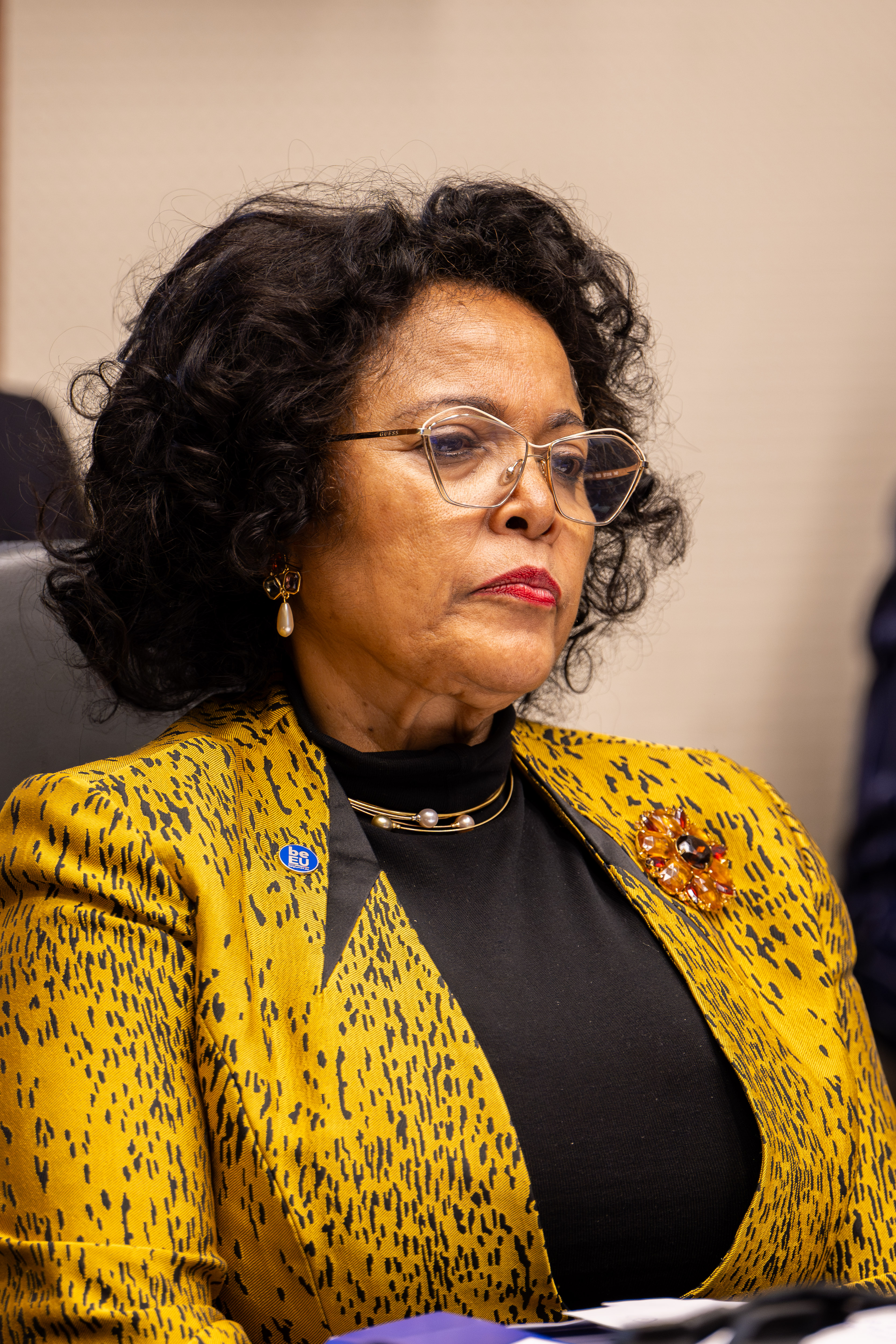
- Bekele-Thomas in 2024

Director-General of the African Union Development Agency-New Partnership for Africa's Development
- Incumbent
- Assumed office 1 May 2022
- Preceded by: Ibrahim Hassane Mayaki

Personal details
- Born: 1958 or 1959 (age 66–67) Addis Ababa, Ethiopian Empire
- Children: 5
- Education: Addis Ababa University; New York University

Nardos Bekele-Thomas (born 1958 or 1959) is an Ethiopian economist and professor who has been serving as the first female Director-General of the African Union Development Agency-New Partnership for Africa's Development (AUDA-NEPAD) since 2022. She previously worked in several international organizations such as the United Nations Development Programme and the United Nations Secretariat, and is also member of the supervisory board of the Global Center on Adaptation.

== Early life ==
Bekele-Thomas was born in 1958 or 1959 in Addis Ababa, Ethiopian Empire. She was the fifth of 14 siblings; her father was a civil servant and farmer who also ran a business with his wife. As a result of the Ethiopian Revolution in 1974, two of her brothers died and her father lost his lands following nationalisation. For this reason, at the age of 18, Bekele-Thomas left the country and went to Moyale, on the Kenyan side of the border, to take part in a literacy campaign. Once this was completed, she returned to Ethiopia.

She obtained a degree in economic development and planning, applied statistics and political economy in 1982 from Addis Ababa University, and a master's degree in economic development, monetary economics and econometrics from New York University in 1985, where she also got a PhD.

== Career ==
Bekele-Thomas began working at Addis Ababa University as a research assistant and lecturer in basic mathematics and statistics, and at the United Nations Development Programme both in Ethiopia and in New York. She was posted to India in 1987 to work for the UNDP, and has worked in various countries, including Bhutan, the Comoros, Uganda, Chad, the Czech Republic, Cameroon, Gabon and the Central African Republic.

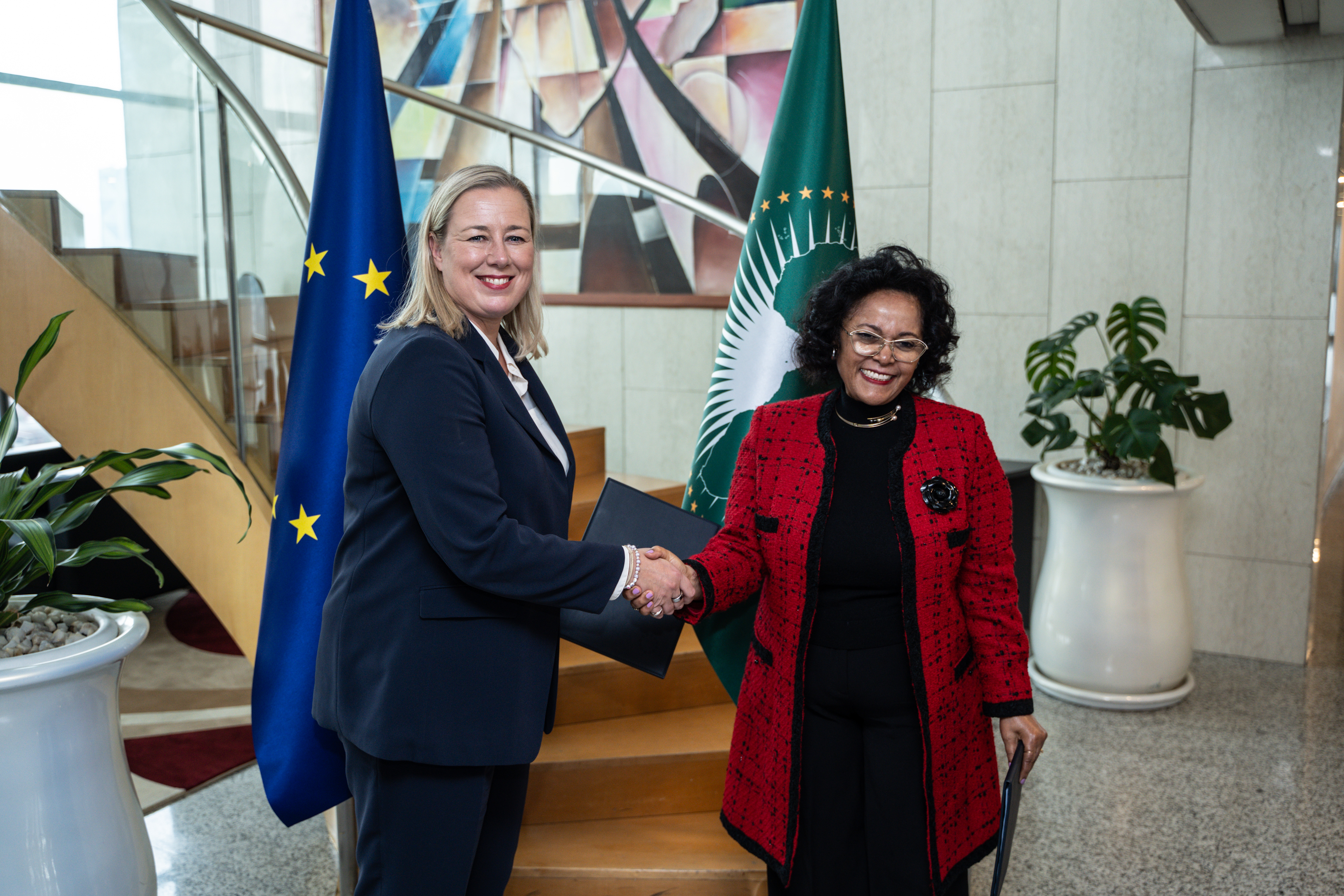
Bekele-Thomas (right) with European Commissioner for International Partnerships Jutta Urpilainen, 14 October 2024

In September 2013, Bekele-Thomas was appointed UNDP Resident Representative in Kenya, having served as Deputy Resident Representative there for the previous four years. She also served as UNDP Resident Representative in Benin and United Nations Resident Coordinator to South Africa. Between 2016 and 2017, she served as Senior Director of the United Nations Secretariat, whose administrative responsibilities included the Office of the Secretary-General, the Office of the Chief of Staff to the Secretary-General and the Office of the Deputy Secretary-General.

During the 35th ordinary session of the African Union Summit in February 2022, Ms Bekele-Thomas was chosen as the first woman to head African Union Development Agency-New Partnership for Africa's Development, succeeding Ibrahim Hassane Mayaki. She took up the post on 1 May. The Assembly of the African Union re-elected her in February 2026.

Bekele-Thomas joined the supervisory board of Global Center on Adaptation on 26 November 2025 alongside several former heads of st.

She has worked in particular to empower young people and women.

== Personal life ==
She is married to Adebisi Babatunde Thomas, who was a permanent resident of the UNDP in the 1980s and whom she met in Kenya when she was posted there for consultancy work. They have five children.

She speaks fluently English and French.

== Awards ==
- Living Legend Achiever's Award (2007)
- AU/DAF Award of 2015 Woman of Excellence for "for her outstanding contribution to women in Africa"
