= Purdue Improved Crop Storage bags =

Hermetic food storage containers

Purdue Improved Crop Storage (PICS) bags (formerly known as Purdue Improved Cow-pea Storage bags) are bags developed by scientists at Purdue University to store grain and seeds. They use hermetic storage technology to reduce loss of post-harvest cowpea (Vigna unguiculata) due to bruchid infestations in West and Central Africa.

A PICS bag consists of two layers of polyethylene liners and a layer of woven polypropylene. Each layer is closed separately to create a hermetically sealed container for harvested grain. This oxygen-deprived environment kills Bruchidius atrolineatus larvae, the cow-pea weevil (Callosobruchus maculatus), and some other post-harvest pests.

== History ==
The development of PICS bags began in 1987 when Professor Larry Murdock of Purdue University, along with Bean/Cow-pea CRSP, USAID, and BIFAD, sought a solution to combat orchard infestations of cow-pea harvests in Cameroon.

As of 2007, over 1.75 million PICS bags have been sold in West and Central Africa, and demonstrations of their use have been conducted in 31,000 villages. As of 2023, the project has been funded with $11.4 million (USD) by the Bill and Melinda Gates Foundation.

== Objectives ==
The PICS project has evolved since its original conception. As such, the project's focus has also evolved to address the need for providing safe, cheap, and effective post-harvest storage solutions to smallholders.

=== PICS1 (Purdue Improved Cow-pea Storage) ===
Active from 2007 to 2011, this phase of the project aimed to create the ideal design for a triple-layer, hermetically sealed, commercially available cowpea storage bag. Another aim was to educate farmers and rural development groups about non-chemical cowpea storage methods and to demonstrate the most effective cowpea storage methods. The project also strove to develop a local supply chain, making them more available for rural farmers, while providing development opportunities for local businesses. This received funding of $11.4 million for 5 years.

=== PICS2 (Purdue Improved Crop Storage) ===
Active from 2011 to 2014, PICS2 sought to expand the original scope of the PICS program. Its goals were to identify other agricultural commodities that suffer loss to insects and other pests during storage, test the PICS bags through collaborative projects with scientists in sub-Saharan developing nations, implement economic analyses to estimate the potential benefits of optimizing the PICS technology for specific commodities, and develop plans to disseminate the technologies for those commodities where they will provide the greatest benefit. Funding was $1.1 million for 30 months.

=== PICS3 ===
The third phase of the program began in April 2014, and is ongoing as of 2024. The program is currently funded by the Bill and Melinda Gates Foundation. The Gates Foundation also funded the initial PICS1 and PICS2 projects. PICS3 aims to improve market access, income, and food security for smallholders in Sub-Saharan Africa by expanding the availability of PICS technology to reduce post-harvest storage loss.

== Use ==
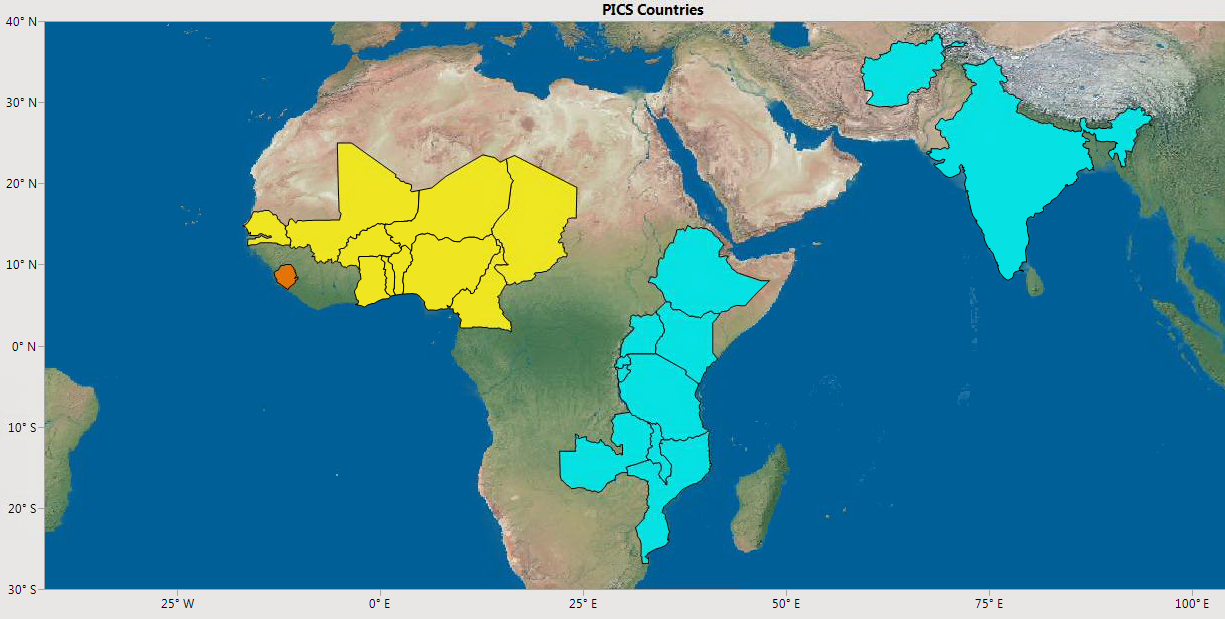
Countries where PICS activities have taken place. Yellow represents target countries during the PICS 1 period. Blue represents countries during the PICS 2 period. Orange represents country where other PICS activities occurred.

This project was first developed in Cameroon, but it has since spread to 23 nations in Africa and Asia. To date, PICS bags have been introduced and are in use in Afghanistan, Benin, Burkina Faso, Burundi, Cameroon, Chad, the Democratic Republic of the Congo, Ethiopia, Ghana, India, Kenya, Malawi, Mali, Mozambique, Niger, Nigeria, Rwanda, Senegal, Tanzania, Togo, Uganda, and Zambia.

After harvesting and thoroughly drying the grain, farmers put it into a polyethylene bag that holds either 50kg or 100kg. The bag is then tightly sealed, preventing air from entering. The first polyethylene bag is surrounded by a second identical bag, which is also sealed, making it airtight. The double-bagged grain is then sealed inside a third woven polypropylene bag, which provides the mechanical strength for PICS bags.

This method creates an airtight environment and seals any insects present in the crop inside the bag. These insects briefly continue to consume oxygen, but as oxygen levels in the bags drop, and CO_{2} concentrations rise, the insects stop feeding and quickly die, thereby protecting the crop from further damage.

Recent studies have shown that bruchids sealed in PICS bags do not die from asphyxiation, but rather from dehydration. This subfamily of Chrysomelidae has the ability to produce water through their own metabolism. However, this process requires oxygen, so when oxygen levels in PICS bags decrease, the orchids lose the ability to produce water and die of dehydration.

== Advantages ==
PICS bags can assist smallholders in a few ways. They are an insecticide-free, relatively cheap method of storing cow-peas and other grains. The PICS bags can be stored in homes, making this an effective way for smallholders to protect their harvests.

Furthermore, the bags can be opened at any time. When they are unsealed, the cow-peas are ready to be consumed. The PICS bags can then be reused, provided they are free of holes or tears. Studies have demonstrated that PICS can be used multiple times for several years without quality loss.

Additionally, the storage allows communities to create food reserves during the post-harvest season. Even after several months of storage in PICS bags, the quality of the grain does not decrease.

== Economic development ==
The PICS project aims to increase the incomes of smallholder producers. By 2012, Purdue University researchers expected each household that used the PICS bags to increase their annual income by an average of $150 USD. With widespread adoption of PICS bags, global savings of cow-pea harvests were predicted to be worth $500 million USD annually.

The additional income provided through the use of PICS bags is expected to allow smallholder producers to invest in their own farming practices and local communities, thereby stimulating local development.

== Disadvantages ==
Some disadvantages of this technology are that PICS bags are prone to being stolen and therefore need to be protected. In areas where grain has always been sold immediately after harvest, storage areas may not exist for PICS bags. New storage facilities may thus need to be built when the bags are introduced to these communities. It is also essential that grain intended to be stored in PICS bags be thoroughly dried prior to storage to prevent mold growth and grain rot.

While PICS bags protect cow-peas against damage caused by insects, they do not provide a barrier against intrusion and mechanical damage by mice, rats, or other animals. The environmental impact of PICS bags also remains unstudied.

== Practical information ==
To increase the effectiveness of PICS bag technology, the following suggestions should be considered:

As studies show, PICS bags work not only by depriving bruchids of oxygen, but also by dehydrating their environment. Therefore, it has been suggested that this technology could be improved by finding additional methods of lowering the moisture content within sealed bags quickly, to facilitate quicker dehydration of pests and insects. Since PICS bags do not provide protection from mice, rats, or other larger animals, any Non-Governmental Organization (NGO) aiming to increase their use should ensure that farmers are taught to store their cowpea harvest in an environment as free of these exterior threats as possible. There is also potential for PICS bags to be improved through the use of an additional barrier that cannot be punctured by animals.

Other projects competing with PICS bags to prevent insect-induced post-harvest grain losses are other forms of hermetically sealed containers, such as the Grain-pro bag. An alternative hermetic method of protecting the crop is to store grain inside sealed steel drums.
