= Gérardine Mukeshimana =

Rwandan politician (born 1970)

Vice President of International Fund for Agricultural Development
- Incumbent
- Assumed office August 2023

Minister of Agriculture and Animal Resources of Rwanda
- In office July 2014 – 2 March 2023

Personal details
- Born: 10 December 1970 (age 55) Rwanda
- Citizenship: Rwandan
- Education: National University of Rwanda (Bachelor of Science; Michigan State University (Master of Science, (Doctor of Philosophy)
- Occupation: Agriculturist, researcher, plant geneticist
- Known for: Agricultural research

Gérardine Mukeshimana is a Rwandan scientist and politician who served as Minister of Agriculture and Animal Resources from July 2014 until March 2, 2023. She was appointed Vice-President of the International Fund for Agricultural Development in August 2023.

== Early life and education ==
Mukeshimana was born on 10 December 1970 in present-day Huye District. She has an agricultural engineering degree from the National University of Rwanda and a master's degree (2001) and a PhD (2013) in biotechnology from Michigan State University. Her doctoral thesis was entitled "Dissecting the Genetic Complexity of Drought Tolerance Mechanisms in Common Bean (Phaseolus Vulgaris L.)" In 2012, she was awarded the 2012 Board for International Food and Agriculture Development (BIFAD) Student Award for Scientific Excellence for her contributions to Rwanda's bean breeding program.

== Career ==
Mukeshimana was a lecturer in the Faculty of Agriculture at the National University of Rwanda and coordinator for the World Bank's Rural Sector Support Project.

In 2013, Mukeshimana was part of the research team at BecA Hub, a biosciences facility at the International Livestock Research Institute in Nairobi.

Mukeshimana was appointed Minister of Agriculture and Animal Resources in the cabinet of Prime Minister Anastase Murekezi in July 2014. She retained her position in a May 2016 cabinet reshuffle by President Paul Kagame.

In June 2016, Mukeshimana hosted the 7th African Agriculture Science Week and General Assembly of the Forum for Agricultural Research in Africa (FARA) in Kigali, which produced a six-point call to action to achieve the "Africa Feed Africa" initiative. In the cabinet reshuffle of 31 August 2017, Mukeshimana retained her cabinet post and her portfolio.

Mukeshimana was appointed Vice-President of the International Fund for Agricultural Development in August 2023.

== Publications ==
- Mukeshimana, Gerardine; Lasley, Amy L. (May 2014). "Identification of Shoot Traits Related to Drought Tolerance in Common Bean Seedlings". Journal of the American Society for Horticultural Science. 139 (3). American Society for Horticultural Science: 299–309. doi:10.21273/JASHS.139.3.299.
- Mukeshimana, Gerardine; Butare, Louis; Cregan, Perry B.; Kelly, James D. (May 2014). "Quantitative Trait Loci Associated with Drought Tolerance in Common Bean". Crop Science. 54 (3): 923–938. doi:10.2135/cropsci2013.06.0427.
