= African Union Development Agency =

Economic development program of the African Union

The African Union Development Agency – Partnership for Africa's Development (AUDA-NEPAD) is an economic development program of the African Union (AU). NEPAD was adopted by the AU at the 37th session of the Assembly of Heads of State and Government in July 2001 in Lusaka, Zambia. NEPAD aims to provide an overarching vision and policy framework for accelerating economic co-operation and integration among African countries.

== Origins and function ==
NEPAD is a merger of two plans for the economic regeneration of Africa: the Millennium Partnership for the African Recovery Programme (MAP), led by Former President Thabo Mbeki of South Africa in conjunction with Former President Olusegun Obasanjo of Nigeria and President Abdelaziz Bouteflika of Algeria; and the OMEGA Plan for Africa developed by President Abdoulaye Wade of Senegal. At a summit in Sirte, Libya, March 2001, the Organisation of African Unity (OAU) agreed that the MAP and OMEGA Plans should be merged.

The UN Economic Commission for Africa (UNECA) developed a "Compact for Africa’s Recovery" based on both these plans and on resolutions on Africa adopted by the United Nations Millennium Summit in September 2000, and submitted a merged document to the Conference of African Ministers of Finance and Ministers of Development and Planning in Algiers, May 2001.

In July 2001, the OAU Assembly of Heads of State and Government meeting in Lusaka, Zambia, adopted this document under the name of the New African Initiative (NAI). The leaders of G8 countries endorsed the plan on July 20, 2001; and other international development partners, including the European Union, China, and Japan also made public statements indicating their support for the program. The Heads of State and Government Implementation Committee (HSGIC) for the project finalized the policy framework and named it the New Partnership for Africa's Development on 23 October 2001. NEPAD became a program of the African Union (AU) after it replaced the OAU in 2002, though it has its own secretariat based in South Africa to coordinate and implement its programmes.

NEPAD's four primary objectives are: to eradicate poverty, promote sustainable growth and development, integrate Africa in the world economy, and accelerate the empowerment of women. It is based on underlying principles of a commitment to good governance, democracy, human rights and conflict resolution; and the recognition that maintenance of these standards is fundamental to the creation of an environment conducive to investment and long-term economic growth. NEPAD seeks to attract increased investment, capital flows and funding, providing an African-owned framework for development as the foundation for partnership at regional and international levels.

In July 2002, the Durban AU summit supplemented NEPAD with a Declaration on Democracy, Political, Economic and Corporate Governance. According to the Declaration, states participating in NEPAD ‘believe in just, honest, transparent, accountable and participatory government and probity in public life’. Accordingly, they ‘undertake to work with renewed determination to enforce’, among other things, the rule of law; the equality of all citizens before the law; individual and collective freedoms; the right to participate in free, credible and democratic political processes; and adherence to the separation of powers, including protection for the independence of the judiciary and the effectiveness of parliaments.

The Declaration on Democracy, Political, Economic and Corporate Governance also committed participating states to establish an African Peer Review Mechanism (APRM) to promote adherence to and fulfilment of its commitments. The 2002 Durban summit adopted a document outlining the stages of peer review and the principles by which the APRM should operate; further core documents were adopted at a meeting in Abuja in March 2003, including a Memorandum of Understanding to be signed by governments wishing to undertake the peer review.

=== Current status ===
Successive AU summits and meetings of the HSGIC have proposed the greater integration of NEPAD into the AU's structures and processes. In March 2007 there was a "brainstorming session" on NEPAD held in Algeria at which the future of NEPAD and its relationship with the AU was discussed by an ad hoc committee of heads of state. The committee again recommended the fuller integration of NEPAD with the AU. In April 2008, a review summit of five heads of state—Presidents Mbeki of South Africa, Wade of Senegal, Bouteflika of Algeria, Mubarak of Egypt and Yar'Adua of Nigeria—met in Senegal with a mandate to consider the progress in implementing NEPAD and report to the next AU summit to be held in Egypt in July 2008. In July 2018, the African Union (AU) Assembly approved the transformation of the NEPAD Planning and Coordinating Agency into the African Union Development Agency (AUDA-NEPAD), establishing it as the AU's technical body to drive the implementation of Agenda 2063.

== Structure ==
=== AUDA-NEPAD Heads of State and Government Committee (HSGOC) ===
A 33-Member State sub-committee of the African Union Assembly of Heads of State and Government that provides the highest political leadership and strategic guidance on Agenda 2063 priority issues and reports its recommendations to the full Assembly for endorsement. The Chairperson of the AU Commission also participates in HSGOC Summits. The current (2025) Chairperson of the AUDA-NEPAD HSGOC is H.E. Abdel Fattah El-Sisi, President of the Arab Republic of Egypt.

There is also a Steering Committee, comprising 20 AU member states, to oversee the development of policies, programs and projects -this committee reports to the HSGIC.

The NEPAD Secretariat, renamed the NEPAD Planning and Coordinating Agency (NPCA), was later integrated into the African Union Development Agency (AUDA-NEPAD) and remains based in Midrand, South Africa. The NEPAD Secretariat is not responsible for the implementation of development programs itself, but works with the African Regional Economic Communities— the building blocks of the African Union. The role of the NEPAD Secretariat is one of coordination and resource mobilisation.

Many individual African states have also established national NEPAD structures responsible for liaison with the continental initiatives on economic reform and development programs.

=== Chief Executive Officers ===
No.	Image	Name	Country	Took office	Left office
1		Wiseman Nkuhlu	South Africa	2000	2005
2		Firmino Mucavele	Mozambique	2005	2008
3		Ibrahim Hassane Mayaki	Niger	2009	2022
4		Nardos Bekele-Thomas	Ethiopia	2022	Incumbent

== Programs ==
The eight priority areas of NEPAD are: political, economic and corporate governance; agriculture; infrastructure; education; health; science and technology; market access and tourism; and environment.

During the first few years of its existence, the main task of the NEPAD Secretariat and key supporters was the popularisation of NEPAD's key principles, as well as the development of action plans for each of the sectoral priorities. NEPAD also worked to develop partnerships with international development finance institutions—including the World Bank, G8, European Commission, UNECA and others—and with the private sector.

After this initial phase, more concrete programs were developed, including:

- The Comprehensive Africa Agriculture Development Programme (CAADP), aimed at assisting the launching of a 'green revolution' in Africa, based on a belief in the key role of agriculture in development. To monitor its progress, the Regional Strategic Analysis and Knowledge Support System was created.
- The Programme for Infrastructure Development in Africa (PIDA), which comprises numerous trans-boundary infrastructure projects in the four sectors transport, energy, water and ICT, aimed at boosting intra-African trade and interconnecting the continent.
- The NEPAD Science and Technology programme, including an emphasis on research in areas such as water science and energy.
- The "e-schools programme", adopted by the HSGIC in 2003 as an initiative with the original goal of equipping all 600,000 primary and secondary schools in Africa with IT equipment and internet access by 2013, in partnership with several large IT companies. See NEPAD E-School program
- The launch of a Pan African Infrastructure Development Fund (PAIDF) by the Public Investment Corporation of South Africa, to finance high priority cross-border infrastructure projects.
- Capacity building for continental institutions, working with the African Capacity Building Foundation, the Southern Africa Trust, UNECA, the African Development Bank, and other development partners. One of NEPAD's priorities has been to strengthen the capacity of and linkages among the Regional Economic Communities.
- NEPAD was involved with the Timbuktu Manuscripts Project although it is not entirely clear to what extent.

== Criticism ==
NEPAD was initially met with a great deal of scepticism from much of civil society in Africa as playing into the 'Washington Consensus' model of economic development. In July 2002, members of some 40 African social movements, trade unions, youth and women's organizations, NGOs, religious organizations and others endorsed the African Civil Society Declaration on NEPAD rejecting NEPAD; a similar hostile view was taken by African scholars and activist intellectuals in the 2002 Accra Declaration on Africa's Development Challenges.

Part of the problem in this rejection was that the process by which NEPAD was adopted was insufficiently participatory—civil society was almost totally excluded from the discussions by which it came to be adopted.

More recently, NEPAD has also been criticised by some of its initial backers, including notably Senegalese President Abdoulaye Wade, who accused NEPAD of wasting hundreds of millions of dollars and achieving nothing. Like many other intergovernmental bodies, NEPAD suffers from slow decision-making, and a relatively poorly resourced and often cumbersome implementing framework. The great lack of information about the day-to-day activities of the NEPAD secretariat—the website is notably uninformative—does not help its case.

However, the program has also received some acceptance from those who were initially very critical, and, in general, has seen its status become less controversial as it becomes more established and its programs become more concrete. The aim of promoting greater regional integration and trade among African states is welcomed by many, even as the fundamental macroeconomic principles NEPAD endorses remain contested.

== See also ==
- African Peer Review Mechanism
- African Union
- NEPAD African Western and Southern Networks of centre of Excellence in water sciences

== Bibliography ==
- The New Partnership for Africa’s Development (NEPAD): An Initial Commentary by Ravi Kanbur, Cornell University
- Nepad’s APRM: A Progress Report, Practical Limitations and Challenges, by Ayesha Kajee
- "Fanon's Warning: A Civil Society Reader on the New Partnership for Africa's Development", edited by Patrick Bond, Africa World Press, 2002
- "The New Partnership for Africa's Development: Challenges and Developments", Centre for Democracy and Development (Nigeria), 2003
- "NEPAD: A New Path?" edited by Peter Anyang' Nyong'o, Aseghedech Ghirmazion and Davinder Lamba, Heinrich Boell Foundation, 2002
- "The African Union, NEPAD, and Human Rights: The Missing Agenda" by Bronwen Manby, Human Rights Quarterly - Volume 26, Number 4, November 2004, pp. 983–1027
- "Economic Policy and Conflict in Africa" in Journal of Peacebuilding and Development, Vol.2, No.1, 2004; pp. 6–20
- "Pan-Africa: The NEPAD formula" by Sarah Coleman, World Press Review July 2002 v49 i7 p29(1)
- "Bring Africa out of the margins", The Christian Science Monitor July 5, 2002 p10
