= Prudence Sebahizi =

Rwandan Economist and Politician

Rwanda Minister of Trade and Industry
- In office August, 2024 – -present
- Appointed by: Paul Kagame
- Preceded by: Jean Chrysostome Ngabitsinze

Former director at African Continental Free Trade Area
- In office November, 2022 – August, 2024

Personal details
- Born: March 1, 1978 (age 48) Gicumbi, Rwanda
- Citizenship: Rwanda
- Education: National University of Rwanda; Seoul National University
- Occupation: Politician
- Portfolio: International Development Policy

Prudence Sebahizi (born 1 March 1978), is a Rwandan international trade economist, politician, and former athlete. Since August 2024, he serves as the Rwandan minister of trade and industry. Before his ministerial appointment, he was the director for institutional matters and programmes coordination at the African Continental Free Trade Area (AfCFTA) Secretariat, based in Accra, Ghana, a role he held from November 2022.

== Early life and education ==
Sebahizi was born in Gicumbi, Rwanda, on 1 March 1978. He earned a Bachelor of Science degree in economics from the National University of Rwanda. In 2011, he completed a master's degree in international development policy at Seoul National University in South Korea.

== Career ==
=== Early career ===
Sebahizi began his career in the early 2000s, working in various capacities within the Government of Rwanda, with a focus on trade and regional integration. Notably, he served as Rwanda's Chief Negotiator during the East African Community (EAC) Common Market Protocol negotiations. The protocol, signed in November 2009, came into force in July 2010.

In 2006, Sebahizi played a key role in Rwanda's accession to the EAC, collaborating with the Ministry of Trade and Industry, the Office of the President, and the Ministry of Foreign Affairs and International Cooperation. Between 2012 and 2014, he served as the National Coordinator of the East African Civil Society Organizations’ Forum (EACSOF), advocating for inclusive regional integration. During this time, he also advised the government on regional integration options and helped implement Rwanda's Diagnostic Trade Integration Study (DTIS), which integrated trade into national policies and strategies.

=== Role in AfCFTA ===
Sebahizi has been instrumental in shaping and operationalizing the African Continental Free Trade Area (AfCFTA). Joining the African Union Commission (AUC) in 2015, he provided technical and strategic guidance during the AfCFTA preparatory process. In August 2016, he was appointed chief technical advisor on AfCFTA and head of the AfCFTA Unit/Interim Secretariat at the African Union Commission. In this capacity, Sebahizi led a team of experts supporting negotiations and strengthening the AUC's capacity to advance the AfCFTA agenda.

=== Cabinet of Rwanda ===
On 14 August 2024, Sebahizi was appointed by President Paul Kagame in the Cabinet of Rwanda as the Rwanda Minister of Trade and Industry succeeding Jean Chrysostome Ngabitsinze. Shortly after his appointment, he represented Rwanda at the 23rd COMESA Heads of State and Government Summit in Bujumbura, Burundi, on 31 October 2024. In November 2024, he attended the 7th China International Import Expo (CIIE) in Shanghai, highlighting Rwanda's commitment to fostering international trade and investment.

== Advocacy ==
Sebahizi has actively championed measures to eliminate non-tariff barriers (NTBs) and streamline trade processes. In December 2024, during a high-level dialogue in Rwanda, he emphasized the need for centralized services, one-stop border posts, and real-time NTB reporting platforms to enhance regional and international trade. The dialogue also reviewed findings from the Trade Regulatory Assessment Study and informed the development of Rwanda's National Strategy on the Elimination of NTBs (2025–2030).

== Sports ==
Sebahizi's early life was marked by his passion for handball. As a university student, he played for the National University of Rwanda’s team. Later, he held various leadership roles within the Rwanda Handball Association, serving as general secretary (2004–2005), manager of resources (2005–2008), and president (2008–2010). Reflecting on his transition from sports, Sebahizi told Igihe.com:

"I always thought my entire life would revolve around sports, but I later realized that physical strength isn’t permanent. I became a sportsman through my involvement in my university handball team and later transitioned into sports administration."
