= Beata Habyarimana =

Rwandan politician and economist

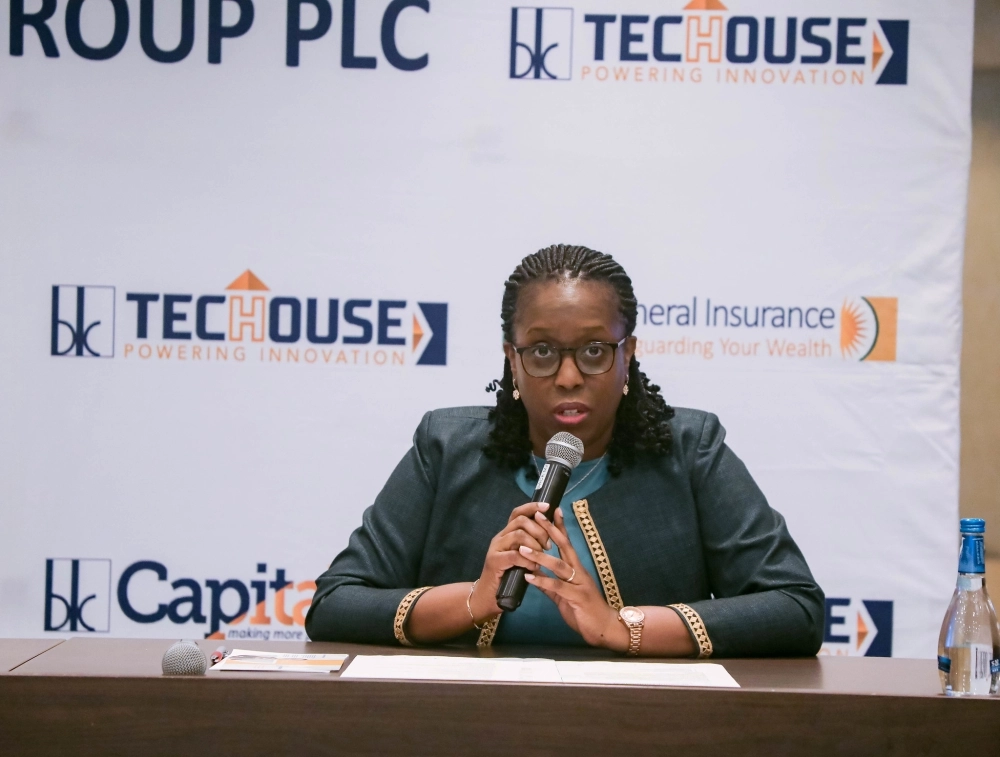
Beata Uwamaliza Habyarimana (2023)

Beata Uwamaliza Habyarimana (born September 1975) is a Rwandan economist and financial advisor by profession. She has worked in the financial industry in domestic, Pan-African and international institutions. Her area of expertise covers business reshuffling and organizational change.

She is currently the Group CEO of Bank of Kigali Group, the largest Rwandan financial Group hosting 5 subsidiaries: Banking, Insurance, Wealth Management services, Digital solutions through a Techouse and Philanthropic activities through a Foundation.

== Early life and education ==
Beata was born in September 1975. She earned her Bachelors Degree in Finance at the University of Rwanda from 1996 to 2000, and she holds a master's degree in economic administration from Maastricht University in the Netherlands in 2011.

== Career ==
Mrs. Béata Uwamaliza Habyarimana served as the Minister of Trade and Industry from March 2021 to July 2022. Prior to that, she served as Deputy Managing Director of Bank of Africa, a multinational pan-African banking conglomerate, with banking operations in eighteen African countries. She also was the Chief Executive Officer of AGASEKE Bank, held Senior Management positions at Banque Populaire du Rwanda, and worked with the Bill and Melinda Gates Foundation as well.

Her personal action is focused on the persistent issues pertaining to women financial empowerment. She is a founding member of New Faces New Voices Rwanda Chapter - a Pan-African advocacy group that focuses on expanding the role and influence of women in the financial sector - and a founding member of RUGORI Investment Network, a Trust Fund for women investment products.
