= Regional Strategic Analysis and Knowledge Support System =

The Regional Strategic Analysis and Knowledge Support System (ReSAKSS) was established in 2006 and compiles and analyzes information to help design and evaluate rural development strategies and monitor the progress of the Comprehensive Africa Agriculture Development Programme (CAADP). CAADP is a program of the African Union and the New Partnership for Africa's Development (NEPAD), which aims to increase the share of national budgets allocated to agriculture.

== Background ==
Especially in the agriculture-based economies of Africa, agriculture is the sector that can affect not only poverty reduction and food security, but can also foster economic growth and sustain the environment. African countries have set up CAADP to reach these goals and a Mutual Accountability Framework (MAF) to measure the program's progress. ReSAKSS plays an important role in this monitoring system by collecting relevant data and undertaking systematic analyses.

In November 2009 a conference was held to assess progress in implementing CAADP in African countries with several countries surpassing the target of 10% of their annual budgets to agriculture.

=== Use of data ===
Besides Strategic analysis, information and data management and capacity strengthening activities to support CAADP implementation and informing policy and decision-making processes in Africa more generally, ReSAKSS data is used by various other actors to analyze and monitor African agricultural development.

For instance, the data has been used by the G8, G20, the OECD, USAID, and the Heinrich Böll Foundation.

== Structure ==
The initiative is governed by Steering Committees that are chaired by the African Union Commission (AUC) and AU–NEPAD Planning and Coordinating Agency (NPCA) at the Africa-wide level and by Common Market of Eastern and Southern Africa (COMESA), Economic Community of West African States (ECOWAS) and Southern African Development Community (SADC) for each of the African sub-regions. The Steering Committees with representatives of the different CAADP stakeholders provide political and strategic guidance to ReSAKSS.

The regional nodes are housed at three Africa-based centers of the CGIAR: the International Institute of Tropical Agriculture (IITA) in Ibadan, Nigeria; the International Livestock Research Institute (ILRI) in Nairobi, Kenya; and the International Water Management Institute (IWMI) in Pretoria, South Africa in collaboration with the International Crops Research Institute for the Semi-Arid Tropics (ICRISAT). The International Food Policy Research Institute (IFPRI) provides the overall coordination across the three nodes.

ReSAKSS and its regional and local components have received funding from the United States Agency for International Development (USAID), the UK Department for International Development (DFID), the Swedish International Development Cooperation Agency (SIDA), and the Bill & Melinda Gates Foundation.

== Criticism ==
The CGIAR, whose member organizations host and manage ReSAKSS, and its donors, namely the Bill & Melinda Gates Foundation have been criticized for their connections to Western governments and multinational agribusiness for furthering a technology-driven agenda that favors large agribusiness at the expenses of small farmers. However, many mainstream sources recognize CGIAR as having support of smallholders and poor farmers central to its mission.
