= Ildephonse Musafiri =

Rwandan politician

- Born: 5 June 1979 (age 47); Rwanda
- Education: National University of Rwanda (Bachelor of Science) (Masters of Science); University of Bonn (Doctor of Philosophy)
- Occupations: Economist, Researcher, Agriculturist
- Title: Minister of Agriculture
- Predecessor: Gérardine Mukeshimana

Ildephonse Musafiri is a Rwandan economist and politician who currently heads the Ministry of Agriculture and Animal Resources since 2 March 2023. Prior to his current appointment, he served as Minister of state in the same ministry from August 2022.

== Early life and education ==
Musafiri was born 5 June 1979, in Rutsiro, western province of Rwanda. He graduated his high school education in 1998 at Kayove Teacher Training School, in western province of Rwanda. In 2004, he got a bachelor's degree in development economics, a master's degree in applied economics from the National University of Rwanda in 2008, and a PhD in agricultural economics from the University of Bonn in Germany in 2015. His doctoral thesis was entitled, The determinants of long term growth in smallholder agriculture in Rwanda: an intergenerational analysis.

== Career ==
In 2003, he worked as an intern at World Vision Rwanda in development activities project (DAP), later in 2007 he became community capacity strengthening officer of the same organization until 2009. He was tutorials assistant of mathematics for economists at National University of Rwanda from 2006 to 2008, he became the course lecturer in 2009 at the same institution, and senior lecturer in 2016.

Musafiri served in Rwanda office of the president Paul Kagame as executive director of the Strategy and Policy Council (SPC) from 2016 to his appointment as minister of state in ministry of Agriculture and animal Resources appointed by President Paul Kagame in August 2022.

Musafiri served as a member of the board of directors of the National Bank of Rwanda for four years from 2018. He became minister of Agriculture and animal Resources on 2 March 2023, in the Rwandan cabinet of Prime Minister Edouard Ngirente.
