= Viviane Bampassy =

Senegalese politician

Viviane Laure Elisabeth Bampassy is a Senegalese politician. She has been the Minister of Civil Service, Manpower Rationalisation and Public Service Renewal since 2014.

== Biography ==
Bampassy graduated from the National School of Administration in 1992.

She was the deputy governor of the Dakar Region in charge of development and later of administrative affairs. She was also the prefect of the Guédiawaye and Pikine departments, before she became the Principal Private Secretary of the Ministry of Culture. In January 2013, she was appointed General Secretary of the Ministry of Youth, Employment and Promotion of Citizens' Values.

In October 2013, she was appointed governor of the Fatick Region by President Macky Sall after the meeting of the Council of Ministers. She was the first female governor in Senegal.

In July 2014, Bampassy was appointed Minister of Public Service, Manpower Rationalisation and Public Service Renewal within the Government Dionne I, succeeding Mansour Sy.

In November 2017, she became the ambassador of Senegal to Canada. In September 2021, her accreditation has been extended to Cuba as non-resident.
