= Solange Uwituze =

Rwandan politician (born 1974)

Solange Uwituze (born 1974) is a Rwandan politician who has served as a board member of the Rwanda Development Board (RDB) since 2020. She has also been the deputy director-general in charge of animal resources research and technology transfer at the Rwanda Agriculture Board since 2018, along with being a founding fellow of the Rwanda Academy of Sciences.

== Career ==
Born in Rwanda, Uwituze was raised in a household that primarily spoke French and she desired from a young age to learn English and learn in the United States, particularly due to the meritocratic advancement available to women in the US. During the Rwandan genocide in 1994, multiple members of her family were killed, including her father and two of her brothers, which made her determined to do something with her life and have a purpose beyond the violence that occurred. She went on to obtain a Bachelor's degree from the National University of Rwanda, in 2002 and stayed at the university as an academic secretary in the agricultural research department.

She then obtained a Fulbright scholarship in 2005 that allowed her to go to graduate school in the US and she spent eight months at the University of California – Davis taking English classes and passing the required tests for English proficiency before she could attend graduate school. After passing, she attended Kansas State University where she earned a Master's of Science in animal sciences in 2008 and a PhD in Animal Sciences in 2011. Her graduate research took place at the university's preharvest food safety laboratory and she conducted her research on the options for Rwanda to improve its agricultural system with the limited available arable land and the lack of grazing land for livestock.

She returned to Rwanda that same year after finishing her degrees and joined a teaching position at the University of Rwanda before eventually being made vice-dean and then the Dean of the university for the Faculty of Agriculture in 2012. This made her the first female dean at the university and she continued her work there until 2014 where she left to join Uganda's Makerere University and the Regional Universities Forum for Capacity Building in Agriculture (RUFORUM) program. The purpose of this organization is to combine the efforts of 163 universities across 40 African countries and train graduate students in how to perform agricultural outreach and bring technological research advancements to different parts of the continent, with its setup being modeled after the land-grant university system. Uwituze was put in charge of both the training and quality assurance branches of the program.

Uwituze was also made a member of the international group Sida (Swedish International Development Cooperation Agency) in 2012 in order to help improve the curriculum of the agricultural programs at the university within three years. At the same time, she acted with the Women Leadership Program in Agriculture as supported by USAID in order to expand the number of Rwandan women active in agribusiness, with Uwituze being the project director of the program.

In 2016, she became a founding fellow of the Rwanda Academy of Sciences.
