= Accra Declaration =

The Accra Declaration confirmed the support of the two main healthcare interoperability standards by the open source community. With the support of major open source advocates, this allowed free and unfettered access to the core healthcare interoperability standards which resulted in a substantial increase in their usage. The International Healthcare Modelling Standards Development Organisation (IHMSDO) had earlier placed the intellectual property (IP) of the HL7 and DICOM standards and the IHE profiles into the public domain under the creative commons licence.

The declaration was signed at the May 2015 IHMSDO Standards and Implementation Meeting in Ghana.
