= Thaddée Nsengiyumva =

Rwandan bishop (1949–1994)

Mgr. Thaddée Nsengiyumva
- Bishop of Kabgayi
- Nsengiyumva in 1992
- Installed: 8 October 1989
- Term ended: 5 June 1994
- Predecessor: André Perraudin
- Successor: Anastase Mutabazi

Personal details
- Born: 17 March 1949 Bungwe, Rwanda
- Died: 5 June 1994 (aged 45) Gakurazo
- Motto: Adveniat Regnum Tuum

Thaddée Nsengiyumva (17 March 1949 - 5 June 1994) was the Bishop of Kabgayi in Rwanda. He was killed at Kabgayi during the Rwandan genocide in 1994.

== Biography ==
Thaddée Nsengiyumva was born at Bungwe on 17 March 1949. He was ordained a priest on 20 July 1975, and on 18 November 1987 he was appointed Coadjutor Bishop of Kabgayi, and he was ordained in this post on 31 January 1988.

He became Bishop of Kabgayi on 8 October 1989, succeeding André Perraudin.

In December 1991 Nsengiyumva issued a pastoral letter "Convertissons-nous pour vivre ensemble dans la paix", in which he said that no serious efforts were being made to resolve the struggle between the Hutu and Tutsi people, and saying that political "assassination is now commonplace". His document was self-critical, saying the church had not done enough to help the people, and had become complicit in the regime's system.

After the genocide began in 1994, Nsengiyumva, who was president of the Episcopal Conference of Rwanda, made repeated appeals to stop the killing. Together with the International Committee of the Red Cross, ICRC he tried to assist a lot of war displaced around and into the bishopric. However, on 16 April he issued a letter which was generally thought to support the Hutu government against the Tutsi rebellion.

== Death ==
On 5 June 1994 Thaddée Nsengiyumva was murdered at Gakurazo by soldiers of the Rwandan Patriotic Army. The Archbishop of Kigali, Vincent Nsengiyumva and bishop Joseph Ruzindana died with him. Ten priests were also killed. It has been said that Thaddée Nsengiyumva was killed by accident, and the real target was his namesake Vincent Nsengiyumva. This is not plausible, since the two men were killed together.
