= Fulgence Nsengiyumva =

Rwandan politician

- Born: Rwanda
- Occupation: Politician

Fulgence Nsengiyumva is a Rwandan politician. In 2016, Nsengiyumva was appointed as Minister of State for Agriculture (Minagri) of Rwanda. In October 2016, Nsengiyumva met US Ambassador to Rwanda, Erica J. Barks-Ruggles, at the launch of the Agriculture Land Information System in Kigali. The system was launched in partnership with the US Agency for International Development (USAID).
