= Forum for Agricultural Research in Africa =

FARA
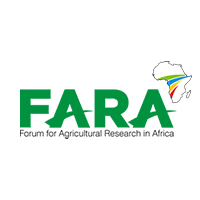
- Formation: 1990
- Type: Continental Forum
- Legal status: International forum
- Purpose: Agricultural research and innovation
- Headquarters: Ghana
- Region served: Africa
- Website: https://faraafrica.org/

The Forum for Agricultural Research in Africa (FARA) is the technical branch of African Union Commission on the issues of Agriculture science, technology and innovation. It is also the highest continental organisation for agricultural research for development and it has its headquarters in Ghana.

== History ==
It was established in the 1990s by a group of African scientists and some donors who believed that agriculture could lift millions of people out of poverty in Africa. Therefore, they brought the disjointed agricultural research under an organisation and it was voted into existence in 1997 by Sub-Regional Organizations like CORAF/WECARD, ASARECA and SADC-FANR, during the 17th Plenary of the Special Programme for African Agricultural Research at the World Bank

== Governance ==
The governance of the organisation is divided into three;

General Assembly

FARA Board of Directors

FARA secretariat
