= List of newspapers in Senegal =

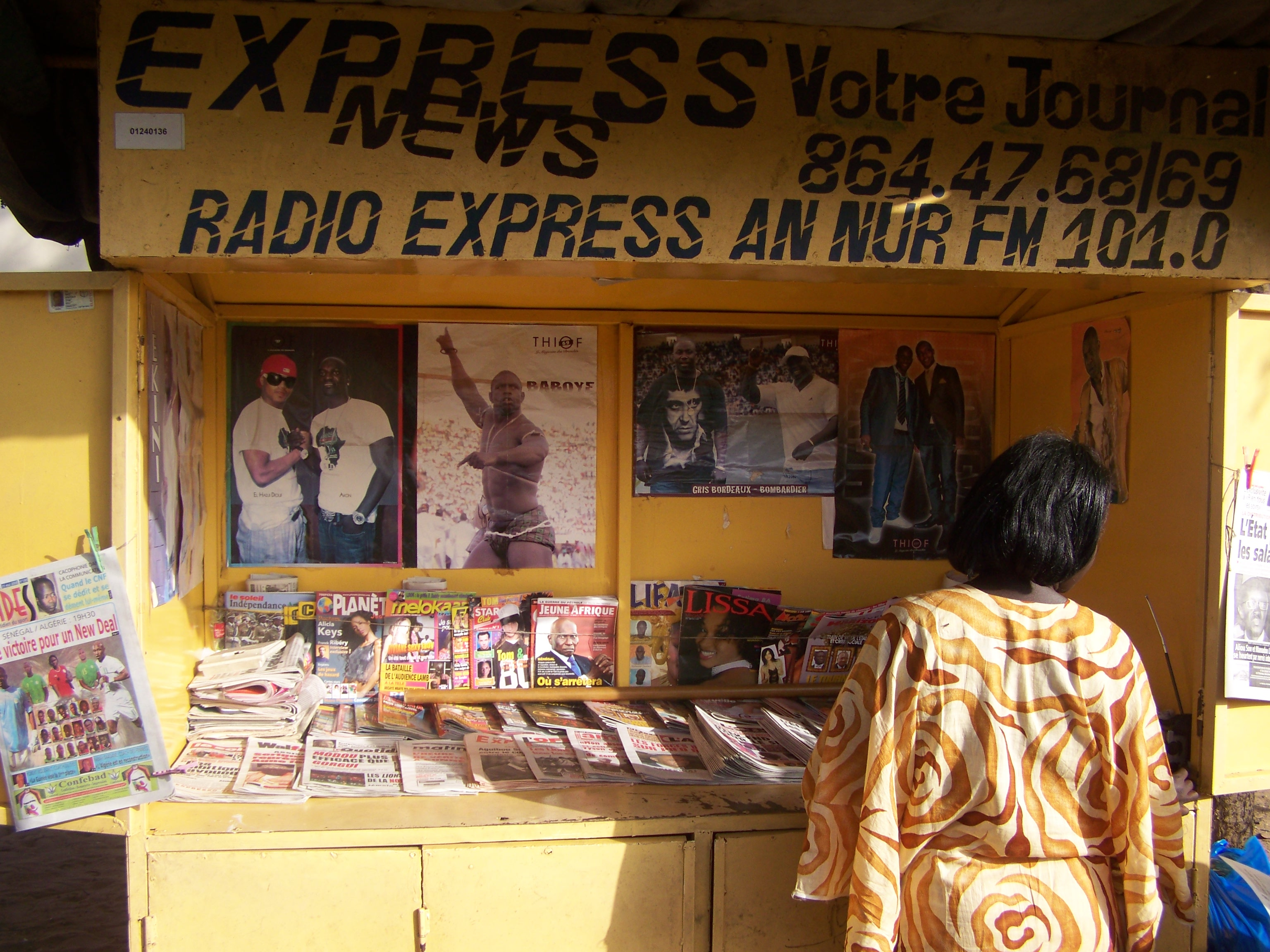
Newspaper stand, Dakar, 2008

The reading public for Senegal's diverse press is largely limited to Dakar and Thies. Le Soleil is the quasi-official daily. Other major popular independent newspapers include the dailies Sud Quotidien, WalFadjri, Le Quotidien, Le Matin, Le Populaire, Il Est Midi, and the economic weekly Nouvel Horizon. National newspapers are in French. English-language newspapers such as the International Herald Tribune are also available at many newsstands. Various trade organizations publish bulletins and newsletters such as those of the Dakar Chamber of Commerce and the periodical Entreprendre issued by the National Council of Business Leaders.

== Newspapers ==
Below is the list of the main newspapers published in Senegal. All are in French, unless otherwise indicated

Newspaper	Frequency	Circulation (2014)	Owner (in 2014)
Il Est Midi	daily	15,000	
Le Matin	daily	10,000	Le Matin
Le Messager	daily	10,000	
Nouvel Horizon	weekly	30,000	
Le Quotidien	daily	8,000	Groupe Avenir Communication SA
Le Soleil	daily	25,000	SSPP Le Soleil SA
Sud Quotidien	daily	7,000	Groupe Sudcommunication
Wal Fadjri	daily	7,000	Groupe Wal Fadjri

== Defunct ==
- Moniteur du Sénégal et dépendances
- Le Réveil du Sénégal

== See also ==
- Media of Senegal
- List of radio stations in Senegal
- List of radio stations in Africa
- Television in Senegal
- Telecommunications in Senegal

== Bibliography ==
- Jacques Bouzerand [in French] (1967). La presse écrite à Dakar, sa diffusion, son public (PDF) (Thesis) (in French). Université de Dakar – via Sist.sn.
- Mody Sow (1983), Presse écrite et audio-visuelle au Sénégal (PDF) (in French), France: Ecole Nationale Superieure des Sciences de l'information et des Bibliotheques
- "Senegal: Directory: the Press". Africa South of the Sahara 2003. Regional Surveys of the World. Europa Publications. 2003. p. 898. ISBN 9781857431315. ISSN 0065-3896.
- Willings Press Guide World News Media. Vol. 2. Cision UK Ltd. 2015. ISBN 978-1-906035-69-3.
