= Fatou =

Fatou may refer to:

== People ==
- Aminata Fatou Diallo (born 1995), French footballer
- Cecilia Fatou-Berre (1901 – 1989), religious sister
- Fatou Baldeh (born 1983), Gambian women's rights activist
- Fatou Bensouda, Gambian lawyer and former Chief Prosecutor of the International Criminal Court
- Fatou Bintou Fall (born 1981), Senegalese athlete
- Fatou Camara (journalist), Gambian journalist
- Fatou Coulibaly (born 1987), Ivorian footballer
- Fatou Diagne (born 1996), Senegalese basketball player
- Fatou Diatta, Senegalese rapper and activist
- Fatou Dieng (athlete) (born 1983), Mauritanian sprint athlete
- Fatou Dieng (basketball) (born 1983), Senegalese basketball player
- Fatou Diome (born 1968), French-Senegalese writer
- Fatou Dioup (born 1994), Mauritanian footballer
- Fatou Jagne Senghore, Gambian jurist
- Fatou Jallow, Gambian model
- Fatou Jaw-Manneh, Gambian journalist
- Fatou Kandé Senghor (born 1971), Senegalese film director
- Fatou Kanteh (born 1997), Gambian footballer
- Fatou Keïta (born 1965), Ivorian writer
- Fatou Khan (c. 1880–c. 1940), Gambian administrator
- Fatou Kiné Camara (born 1964), Senegalese lawyer
- Fatou Mass Jobe-Njie, Gambian politician
- Fatou N'Diaye (basketball) (born 1962), French - Senegalese basketball player
- Fatou N'Diaye (actress), Senegalese actress
- Fatou Ndiaye Sow, Senegalese writer
- Fatou Niang Siga (born 1932), Senegalese author
- Fatou Pouye (born 1997), Senegalese basketball player
- Fatou Samba, member of the Korean girl group Blackswan
- Fatou Sanyang Kinteh, Gambian politician
- Fatou Seidi Ghali, Tuareg musician from Niger
- Fatou Sene (born 1989), Senegalese footballer
- Fatou Sow (sociologist) (born 1941), Senegalese sociologist
- Fatou Tiyana (born 1987), Gambian athlete
- Mame Fatou Faye (born 1986), Senegalese athlete
- Ndèye Fatou Kane, (born 1986 in Dakar), Senegalese writer
- Ndèye Fatou Soumah (born 1986), Senegalese athlete
- Pierre Fatou, French mathematician

== Other ==
- Fatou (album), an album by Malian musician Fatoumata Diawara
- Fatou (gorilla), a gorilla in the Berlin Zoo
- Fatou station, subway station in Beijing
- Tropical Depression Fatou (1979)
- 20394 Fatou, an asteroid

== See also ==
- Fatu (disambiguation)
- Fatoumata
