= Babacar Sedikh Diouf =

Senegalese historian, author and researcher (born 1928)

Babacar Sedikh Diouf Serer: Babakar Sidiix Juuf
- Born: Babacar Sedikh Diouf; 1928; Senegal
- Occupations: Historian, former teacher, researcher, author, essayist, Pan-Africanist,
- Notable work: 1. Les mégalithes, monuments funéraires ou sanctuaires d'initiation?, 2. La présence sérère dans les fondements historiques et culturels de la nation 3. L'imaginaire sérère dans l'œuvre de Léopold Sédar Senghor; 4. Leopold Sédar Senghor et l'éducation

Babacar Sedikh Diouf or Babacar Sédikh Diouf (Serer: Babakar Sidiix Juuf; born 1928) is a Senegalese historian, author, researcher, campaigner against "Wolofization", a Pan-Africanist, and former teacher. He has written extensively about the history and culture of Senegal, Africa, and that of the Serer ethnic group to which he belongs. He usually writes by the pen name Babacar Sedikh Diouf.

== Academia ==
In 1951, Diouf met Léopold Sédar Senghor – the future President of Senegal, when Senghor visited a village in Casamance were Diouf was working at the time as a teacher. Senghor, who was then a member of parliament was visiting the area as a surprise and had to sleep overnight in a hut—away from the comforts he was used to. According to Diouf, after that chance meeting, he became a supporter of Senghor "because his visit had proved his humility and interest in teaching." As a result, he started to read Senghor's literary works. Sometime later, Senghor awarded him a grant to study Serer history "along Cheikh Anta Diop's hypotheses."

Diouf, who is a retired teacher was appointed President of the Association of Retired Teachers of Senegal (French: l'association des instituteurs à la retraite). As of 1980, he was the Director of the Thiers School (l'Ecole Thiers). He has been a long-standing member of the National Union of Languages.

Diouf sometimes write by the pen name Babacar Sedikh Diouf. Many of his works are unpublished but cited by African, Caribbean and Western scholars who've interacted with him over the years. Some of these include gender politics writers Louise Langevin, Fatou Kiné Camara and Jeremy I. Levitt; historians Mamadou Diouf, Abdoulaye Keita of IFAN—UCAD, Cyr Descamps and Iba Der Thiam; and anthropologist Henry Gravrand.

Diouf usually writes in French but has also written in Serer. An eighty-page short biography of the 19th century Serer King of Sine — Maad a Sinig Kumba Ndoffene Famak Joof, titled: O maad a sinig : Kumba Ndoofeen fa Maak JUUF (Buka-Cilaas), 1853–1871, PAPF (1987) was written in Serer.

=== Senegambian stone circles ===
Diouf was one of the first (if not the first) to suggest a Serer religious significance for the Senegambian stone circles, based in part on their arrangement and religious symbolism which he saw as related to Serer numerology. His work published on 7 July 1980 on the Senegalese newspaper Le Soleil became headline news and was picked up by the prehistorian and archaeologist Professor Cyr Descamps and his colleague Professor Iba Der Thiam.

The builders of these megaliths are still unknown. Other possible candidates are the ancestors of the Jola people or the Wolof

=== The Guelowar Dynasty in Seereer kingdoms ===
The mainstream view has been that, the Guelowar Maternal Dynasty (whom some writers such as Martin A. Klein, Donald R. Wright and Emmett Jefferson Murphy wrongly labelled as Mandinka or Malinke) conquered the Serer people and subjugated them. After years of researching and documenting the oral traditionas of the Serer and that of Kaabu, Diouf was one of the first historian and author to posit that the Guelowars of Sine and Saloum (the two Serer kingdoms) did not conquer and subjugate the Serer people but were granted asylum by the Serer Council of Great Lamans, who then went on marry into the Serer noble patriclans. The Guelowars who were relatives and offshoots of the powerful Ñaanco (or Nyancho) Maternal Dynasty of Kaabu, underwent a dynastic war or struggle against their powerful Ñaanco relatives. The Senegalese historian Alioune Sarr, in his acclaimed paper Histoire du Sine-Saloum (1986–87) supports that view and placed that dynastic war around 1335. Sarr's Histoire du Sine-Saloum is one of the leading work on the history of Sine-Saloum and is generally regarded as the prevailing view especially in regards to the date of reign of the Kings of Sine and Saloum.

Diouf went on to posit that:

Maysa Waly [the first Guelowar to reign in Serer country] was first appointed legal adviser to the Council of the Great Lamans after his famous judgment. Gradually, he strengthened his power and authority and ended up being recognized as king.

Maysa Wali's direct descendants did not reign in any of the Serer kingdoms. Serer noble men from the ancient lamanic class married Guelowar women, and the offsprings of these marriages reigned as kings. These children saw themselves as Serer and assimilated into Serer culture and all ties with Kaabu were severed. The Serer—Guelowar alliance was an alliance based on marriage, not conquest. With the exception of the Serer being a conquered group—which has been the mainstream view, Emmett Jefferson Murphy's earlier work History of African Civilization (1972) reached a somewhat similar conclusion on the Serer—Guelowar (or "Malinke" as he put it) marriage alliance. He writes:

The Serer people had earlier settled on the plains of the highland of Futa Toro in modern Senegal. They lived side by side with the Tukulor and were ruled by them until the eleventh century. At that time, perhaps because of growing Islamic influence among the Tukulor, the Serer—who refused to accept Islam–migrated to an area between the Sine and Saloum rivers in what is now southeastern Senegal. The Serer conquered the Mande-speaking tribes then inhabiting the Sine-Salum and settled the area. Within a century, however, powerful Malinke invaders also moved into the Sine-Salum, settling among the Serer as a ruling class. This caste, called the tiedo, subdivided into the "guelowar," or the nobles eligible for the kingship (only Malinke or the descendants of Malinke-Serer marriages were included); [...]

The various Serer groups who saw the entire Senegambia region as their homeland were already in the Sine-Saloum area in the 11th century and should not be confused with the Serers of Takrur—who were affected by the jihadic wars of King War Jabi and his allies.

As common in the Senegambia region and in many African cultures, when a woman from another tribe marries a man from a different tribe, both she and her children takes on the tribe of the father. Throughout the six hundred years of Guelowar dynastic rule, none of the reigning kings of Sine or Saloum bore Mandinka surnames, but Serer surnames with the few exceptions of the Mbooj or Mboge patrilineage, who patrilineally trace descent to Mbarick Bo or Mbarik Bo (or Mbanyik Bo), originally from Waalo, whose surname Bo is "Wolofized" to Mbooj. According to Serer oral tradition, he was the step father of Ndiadiane Ndiaye (founder of the Jolof Empire) and a Bambara prince from the Massassi dynasty of Kaarta; and according to Wolof oral tradition, he was the step father of Ndiadiane Ndiaye but a non-Muslim and a slave of the Almoravid Arab Abu Bakr ibn Umar (also referred to as Abdu Darday). Sources do not agree with the Wolof account of him being a slave of Abu Bakr or that Abu Bakr was the father of Ndiadiane Ndiaye as per Wolof oral tradition, as Abu Bakr preceded Ndiadiane Ndiaye by at least three hundred years. Ndiadian reigned in Jolof around 1360. Abu Bakr was killed in 1087 possibly by the Serer bowman Amar Godomat.

=== Selection of works ===
The following are a sample of Diouf's works:

- O maad a sinig : Kumba Ndoofeen fa Maak JUUF (Buka-Cilaas), 1853–1871 by Babacar Sedikh Diouf, PAPF (1987)
- L'esprit de l'ecole nouvelle by Babacar Sedikh Diouf, (1988)
- Gradation modification effects on engineering performance of reclaimed asphalt pavement for use as roadway base by Babacar Sedikh Diouf, M.S. Florida Institute of Technology (2011) – (thesis)
- Les mégalithes, monuments funéraires ou sanctuaires d'initiation?, by Babacar Sedikh Diouf, Age d'or du Sénégal. Pages 53–64. (article)
- La présence sérère dans les fondements historiques et culturels de la nation, by Babacar Sédikh Diouf
- L'imaginaire sérère dans l'œuvre de Léopold Sédar Senghor by Babacar Sédikh Diouf. (1998) [in] "Le colloque senghorien ", pp. 241–245
- Leopold Sédar Senghor et l'éducation, by Babacar Sedikh Diouf, Éthiopiques, (1979)
- Stratégie d'integration des valeurs traditionnelles dans nos systèmes d'éducation (enseignement conventionnel), by Alioune Ndoye and Babacar Sedikh Diouf, Éthiopiques (1982)
- Que faire de la pédagogie traditionnelle du Kasak au 21^{e} siècle by Babacar Sedikh Diouf, Éthiopiques (1982)
- Le sérère, paganisme polythéiste ou religion monothéiste, by Babacar Sédikh Diouf [in] Camara, Fatou Kiné, Pouvoir et justice dans la tradition des peuples noirs: philosophie et pratique. Études africaines, ISSN 1274-9710. L'Harmattan (2004), p. 205-217. ISBN 9782747566568

== Pan Africanism ==
In 2004, Diouf was invited by the Institut Fondamental d'Afrique Noire to give a speech at the cultural and scientific institute's conference—held at the University of Mutants in Gorée. In that conference, Diouf spoke out against globalization, and called for a Pan-African approach and the need to increase solidarity among African countries.

== Views on Wolofization ==
Diouf is a fervent opponent of linguistic "Wolofization" which is prevalent throughout Senegal and almost engulfing the entire Senegambia region. He views Wolofization as destructive to the languages and cultures of other Senegambian ethnic groups such as Serer, Jola, Mandinka, Fula, etc. Diouf calls for a "controlled osmosis" (French: "osmose contrôlée") between Wolof and other ethnicities, and regard Wolofization as a form of “uncontrolled” homogenization of the nation by the Wolof. That is, the Wolof language used as a tool to control other ethnic groups—which could possibly lead to the death or extinction of other ethnic languages and their cultures. Serer intellectuals like Marcel Mahawa Diouf, Mandinaka intellectuals like Doudou Kamara, and Haalpulaar intellectuals like Yoro Doro Diallo and Cheikh Hamidou Kane share Diouf's view on Wolofization. The historian and author Marcel Mahawa Diouf offers a drastic solution to the "Wolofization problem". Since the Wolof language itself is the original language of the Lebou people, and not the Wolof; and the Wolof people are a mixture of the other Senegambian ethnic group—and became a distinct ethnic group only few centuries ago, Marcel Mahawa Diouf proposes an alliance between all non-Wolofs who have had historic alliances such as Serers, Toucouleurs, Sarakolés, Sossés, Jola, Lebou, etc. The purpose of this is to disconnect the Wolof, and in effect, disinherit them from the Senegambia region and its history. In the oral tradition of the Wolof, they claim descent from Ndiadiane Ndiaye-founder of the Jolof Empire. However, Ndiadian had a Haalpulaar mother and a Serer father, and his name came from the Serer language. In essence, Marcel's proposal for dealing with Wolofization is to relegate the Wolof to a non-existent and irrelevant group.

According to Étienne Smith:

"The alternative national narrative with which so-called peripheral homespun historians are striving to replace the Wolof-centered narrative postulates a coalition of small ethnic groups, interconnected by joking pacts. The Wolof appear nowhere in the ethnogenesis of the Senegalese nation they propose, except as the final product of the mixing of the “scraps” of these groups. In the eyes of the promoters of joking pacts, that is, the Senegalese nation is Wolof only from a linguistic point of view, the Wolof language itself being nothing more than the result of the amalgamation of all of the country’s languages and the Wolof identity being the possible outcome of the merging of such groups. But insofar as honor, prestige, cultural richness, or historical depth is concerned, the peripheral histories of the Serer, Haalpulaar, Joola, or Mandinka occupy center stage. For their promoters, that is what all these singular patriae have in common."

Diouf does not dislike the Wolof people or the Wolof language, but takes issue with the concept of Wolofization which is prevalent in Senegal and encroaching on Gambian soil. For many years, Diouf have advocated for brotherhood and cousinage among all Senegambian peoples. He argues that, "national unity existed long before the name, without fratricidal wars and unnecessary heartbreaks, around a central nucleus whose virtues can still be used."

== See also ==
- Serer history
- Timeline of Serer history
- History of Gambia
- Culture of Gambia
- History of Africa

== Bibliography ==
- Diouf, Babacar Sedikh, O maad a sinig : Kumba Ndoofeen fa Maak JUUF (Buka-Cilaas), 1853–1871, PAPF (1987), pp. 3–4
- Babacar Sedikh Diouf's body of works: Diouf, Babacar Sedikh, O maad a sinig : Kumba Ndoofeen fa Maak JUUF (Buka-Cilaas), 1853–1871 (PAPF, 1987) [in] Consortium of Academic and Research Libraries in Illinois (CARLI) [in] CARLI I-Share (retrieved 8 February 2020)
- Overview of Babacar Sedikh Diouf's works [in] WorldCat (retrieved 8 February 2020)
- Le Soleil (Senegal) [in] AllAfrica.com, Afrique: Babacar Sédikh Diouf, conférencier : « Face à une mondialisation, il faut renouveler l'idéal panafricain » (4 November 2004) by Madeline Malhaire (retrieved 8 February 2020)
- Diouf, Babacar Sédikh, L’imaginaire sérère dans l’oeuvre de Léopold Sédar Senghor, [in] Comité national pour la célébration du 90e anniversaire du Président Léopold Sédar Senghor, Senghor: Colloque de Dakar, Presses universitaires de Dakar (1998), pp. 241–46.
- « Merging ethnic histories in Senegal: whose moral community? », in Derek Peterson & Giacomo Macola (dir.), Recasting the Past: History Writing and Political Work in Modern Africa, Athens, Ohio University Press, 2009, (213–232.), pp. 16, 17 (PDF)) [in] Academia.edu (retrieved 8 February 2020)
- Smith, Étienne, La nation « par le côté » – "Le récit des cousinages au Sénégal", (pp. 907–965), 2006 [in] Cahiers d'Études africaine., Notes: 45, 81, 93; Texte intégral: 3, 54, 55, 71. (retrieved 8 February 2020)
- Smith, Étienne, « Merging ethnic histories in Senegal: whose moral community? », in Derek Peterson & Giacomo Macola (dir.), Recasting the Past: History Writing and Political Work in Modern Africa, Athens, Ohio University Press, 2009, (213–232.), p. 12 (PDF) [in] Academia.edu (retrieved 8 February 2020)
- Descamps, Cyr; Thiam, Iba Der; La préhistoire au Sénégal: recueil de documents, Association sénégalaise des professeurs d'histoire-géographie (1982), pp. 79–80
- Gravrand, Henry, La civilisation sereer: Pangool, Nouvelles Editions africaines du Sénégal (1990), p. 56, ISBN 9782723610551
- Diouf, Babacar Sedikh « La dimension genre dans le vivre ensemble africain » [in] Langevin, Louise, Rapports sociaux de sexe-genre et droit: repenser le droit, Archives contemporaines (2008), p. 96, ISBN 9782914610797 (retrieved 8 February 2020)
- Camara, Fatou Kiné (2015). African Women and the Gender Equality Regime in Africa: From Patriarchy to Parity. In J. Levitt (Ed.), Black Women and International Law: Deliberate Interactions, Movements and Actions (pp. 61–87). Cambridge: Cambridge University Press. (retrieved 8 February 2020)
- Diouf, Babacar Sedikh, La dimension genre dans le 'vivre ensemble' africain [in] Levitt, Jeremy I., Black Women and International Law, Cambridge University Press (2015), p. 75, ISBN 9781107021303 (retrieved 8 February 2020)
- Diouf, Mamadou, Tolerance, Democracy, and Sufis in Senegal, Columbia University Press (2013), p. 172 ISBN 9780231162630 (retrieved 8 February 2020)
- Keita, Abdoulaye, Au carrefour des littératures Afrique-Europe, KARTHALA Editions (2013), p. 118, ISBN 9782811109875 (retrieved 8 February 2020)
- Le Soleil (Senegal), 7 July 1980
- Klein, Martin A., Islam and Imperialism in Senegal: Sine-Saloum, 1847–1914. Edinburgh University Press (1968). pp. 7–8. ISBN 9780804706216
- Wright, Donald R., Oral Traditions from the Gambia: Mandinka griots, Ohio University Center for International Studies, Africa Program (1979), p. 21, ISBN 9780896800830
- Murphy, E. Jefferson, History of African Civilization, Crowell (1972), p. 106, ISBN 9780690381948
- (Babacar Sédikh Diouf) [in] Ngom, Biram, La question Gelwaar et l’histoire du Siin, Dakar, Université de Dakar (1987), p 69
- Ngom, Biram, LA QUESTION GUELWAR ET LA FORMATION DU ROYAUME DU SINE, Ethiopiques n°54 – revue semestrielle de culture négro-africaine. Nouvelle série volume 7 – 2e semestre 1991 (retrieved 8 February 2020)
- Éthiopiques, Issues 55–56, Fondation Léopold Sédar Senghor (1991), p. 32
- Sarr, Alioune, Histoire du Sine-Saloum, (Sénégal), Introduction, bibliographie et notes par Charles Becker. Version légèrement remaniée par rapport à celle qui est parue en 1986–87. p 19
- Fage, John D.; Oliver, Roland; The Cambridge history of Africa: From c. 1600 to c. 1790, p. 486. ISBN 0521209811
- Diouf, Babacar Sédikh, La présence sérère dans les fondements historiques et culturels de la nation, [in] "Les Convergences Culturelles au sein de la Nation Sénégalaise", ed. Moustapha Tambadou (Dakar: Ministère de la Culture du Sénégal, 1996), p. 72–81
- N'Diaye-Correard, Geneviève, Les mots du patrimoine: le Sénégal (cont. Moussa Daff, Equipe du projet IFA.), Archives contemporaines (2006), p. 589, ISBN 9782914610339, (retrieved 8 February 2020)
- Ngom, Pierre; Gaye, Aliou; Sarr, Ibrahima (February 2000). "Ethnic Diversity and Assimilation in Senegal: Evidence from the 1988 Census" (PDF). African Census Analysis Project (ACAP): 3, 27.
- École pratique des hautes études (France). Section des sciences économiques et sociales, École des hautes études en sciences sociales, Cahiers d'études africaines, vol. 46, issue 4; vol. 46, issue 184, Mouton (2006), pp. 933, 938
- Wolf, Hans-Georg, English in Cameroon, Walter de Gruyter (2013), p. 36, ISBN 9783110849059 (retrieved 8 February 2020)
- Mwakikagile, Godfrey, Ethnic Diversity and Integration in The Gambia: The Land, the People and the Culture, Continental Press (2010), pp. 84, 231, ISBN 9789987932221 (retrieved 8 February 2020)
- Mwakikagile, Godfrey, The Gambia and Its People: Ethnic Identities and Cultural Integration in Africa, p 136. (2010), ISBN 9987160239
- « Merging ethnic histories in Senegal: whose moral community? », in Derek Peterson & Giacomo Macola (dir.), Recasting the Past: History Writing and Political Work in Modern Africa, Athens, Ohio University Press, 2009, (213–232.), p. 16 (PDF)) [in] Academia.edu (retrieved 8 February 2020)
- Anyidoho, Kofi. Cross rhythms, Volume 1, Occasional papers in African folklore, p. 118. Trickster Press (1983)
- Diop, Cheikh Anta; and Modum, Egbuna P. Towards the African renaissance: essays in African culture & development, 1946–1960, Karnak House (1996), p. 28, ISBN 0907015859
- Research in African Literatures, Volume 37. University of Texas at Austin. African and Afro-American Studies and Research Center, University of Texas at Austin, African and Afro-American Studies and Research Center, University of Texas (at Austin) (2006), p. 8
- Le Soleil (Senegal), « devoir de confraternité » entre cousins à plaisanterie, 17 May 1996, p. 6).
- Bassène, Pape Chérif Bertrand,( 2011), MEMOIRE DE L'ESCLAVAGE ET DE LA TRAITE NÉGRIÈRE EN SÉNÉGAMBIE (1965–2007), p. 46, Dialectique de la diversité mémorielle,
- Ndoye, Alioune; Diouf, Babacar Sedikh; Stratégie d'integration des valeurs traditionnelles dans nos systèmes d'éducation (enseignement conventionnel), [in] Éthiopiques, numéro 31 révue socialiste de culture négro-africaine, 3^{e} trimestre (1982) and [in] Wathinotes Valeurs africaines (3 November 2016) (West African Think Tank)
- Diouf, Babacar Sedikh, Que faire de la pédagogie traditionnelle du Kasak au 21^{e} siècle, [in] Éthiopiques, numéro 31 révue socialiste de culture négro-africaine, 3^{e} trimestre (1982)
- Camara, Fatou Kiné, Pouvoir et justice dans la tradition des peuples noirs: philosophie et pratique. Études africaines, ISSN 1274-9710. L'Harmattan (2004), p. 205-217. ISBN 9782747566568
