= Abortion in Senegal =

In Senegal, abortion is illegal unless the life of the mother is in danger. Senegal is one of the only countries whose criminal code completely bans abortion. An exception requires a medical certificate and the approval of three doctors. Illegal abortion is punishable by fines and prison. Nearly all abortions in the country are unsafe. Post-abortion care is widely available.

Abortion was banned in the colonial era. In 1967, an exception was made in the case of threat to life. After concerns about unsafe abortion as a public health crisis in the 1990s, Senegal ratified the International Conference on Population and Development and the Maputo Protocol. In 2005, the National Assembly declared that women have a right to post-abortion care. Efforts for this law to legalize abortion in the cases of rape or incest failed. In 2013, a group of NGOs called the Task Force formed with the goal of aligning Senegal's abortion law with the Maputo Protocol. The National Assembly considered a bill in 2024 that would guarantee legal access to medical abortion. International organizations have called for abortion law reform. Domestically, religious families and organizations influence widespread opposition to abortion due to Islamic beliefs.

Many women perform self-induced abortions. Abortion pills are available through the black market. Some medical professionals provide or advertise illegal abortions. Post-abortion care (PAC) has been available since the 1990s, for which Senegal is known as the "PAC pioneer of West Africa". The Ministry of Health promotes the use of manual vacuum aspiration or misoprostol for PAC. Curettage remains common, despite not being recommended, as MVA is often difficult to access. PAC providers sometimes report clients to legal authorities, but most maintain patient confidentiality by implicitly labeling abortions as miscarriages. Senegal has a high rate of infanticide, which is often attributed to the lack of legal abortion. In the 2010s and 2020s, many infant corpses have been discovered in landfills and other places. Women charged with infanticide comprise over one-third of all arrested women.

== Legislation ==
The criminal code of Senegal completely bans abortion. The code of medical ethics allows abortion when it is necessary to save a woman's life. A medical exception requires the approval of three doctors and a medical certificate costing 10,000 CFA francs. Giving advice about accessing abortion is a criminal offense. The United Nations Population Fund considers Senegal to have one of the strictest abortion laws in Africa. As of 2017, it is one of twenty abortion laws that completely bans abortion.

=== Public debate ===
The public largely supports the ban on abortion due to social norms, religious beliefs, and the traditional large family structure. The government is secular yet influenced by powerful religious families. Legislators face pressure from religious leaders to hide support for abortion and fear losing political support. A 2020 survey by L'Association des Juristes Sénégalaises (transl. Association of Senegalese Women Lawyers, AJS) found that 58% of people in the country opposed medical abortion. Most said that it would be acceptable if the woman's health was threatened, but did not agree that it was acceptable in the case of rape.

The prominent Islamic NGO Jamra campaigns against abortion reform. Its spokesman, Mame Mactar Guèye, has said pro-abortion activists are controlled by Western donors against African values. Jamra and its allies have argued that Senegal has always supported abortion only if it threatens life, but feminists shift the discussion toward legalization. A collective of 48 Islamic organizations called "Non à l’avortement" (transl. No to abortion) opposes pro-abortion advertising. Though some Islamic scholars in Senegal say abortion does not violate Islamic law, few of the prominent Islamic groups oppose anti-abortion movements. Health workers have pushed for access to birth control, which is allowed in Islamic law.

== History ==
Abortion was illegalized in the French period. In 1967, an exception was added allowing abortion if the life of the mother is in danger. In the 1990s, studies on the prevalence of unsafe abortions led to the public health community viewing abortion as a public health problem. Senegal ratified the 1994 International Conference on Population and Development (ICPD). In 2004, Senegal was one of the first ratifiers of the Maputo Protocol, which provides a right to abortion in the cases of rape, incest, or danger to the health of the mother or fetus. In 2014, the government formed a group of activists, lawyers, doctors, and MPs to align the penal code with this policy. The International Federation for Human Rights, with three other groups, drafted a proposal for a law that would align with the treaty. The AJS and the advocacy group J-GEN have advocated to align Senegal's abortion law with the treaty.

In 2005, the National Assembly passed a reproductive health bill entitling all women to family planning and obstetric care services, including post-abortion care. AJS and Ministry of Health (MOH) officials wanted the law to provide for abortion in the cases of rape or incest. This failed after some members of the National Assembly said they would withdraw support of the law if it included these provisions.

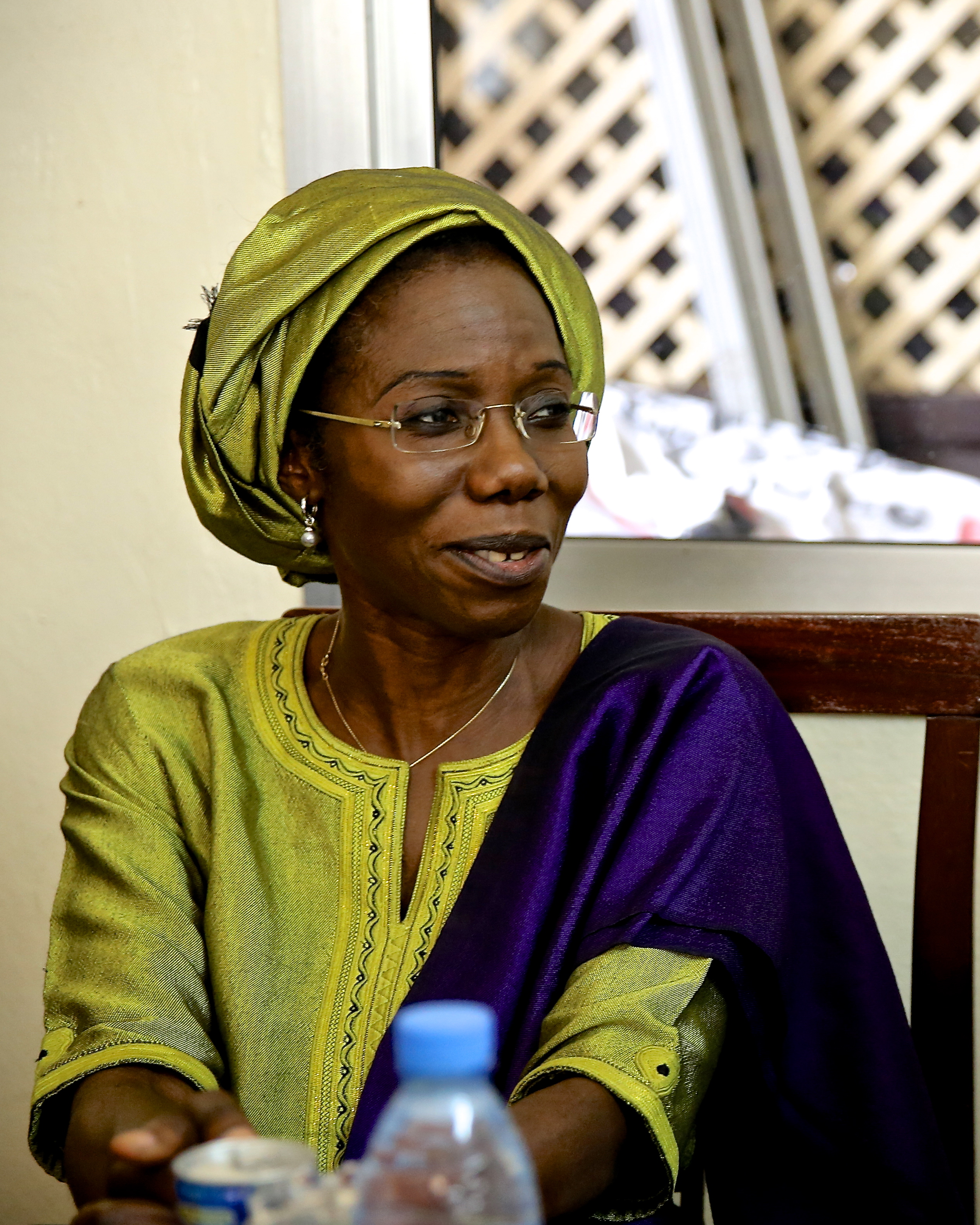
Fatou Kiné Camara in 2014

Organizations such as AJS and the Dakar-based Open Society Initiative for West Africa have worked to educate judges and politicians. Siggil Jigeen, a network of 18 women's rights groups, began discussions of legalizing abortion in July 2010, led by Fatou Kiné Camara of the University of Dakar and the AJS. Since 2008, the AJS has run a free drop-in center in Dakar that provides advice and trauma counseling and trains paralegals to help provide justice. On International Women's Day 2011, L’Association des Médecins Femmes (transl. Association of Women Physicians) gave a presentation urging abortion law reform.

A report written in November 2014 by the NGOs International Federation for Human Rights, African Meeting for the Defense of Human Rights, and Senegalese League of Human Rights called for legislation on safe abortion. Multiple United Nations bodies have advised that Senegal decriminalize abortion: Committee on the Elimination of All Forms of Discrimination against Women in July 2015 and the Committee on the Rights of the Child in March 2016. In 2019, the United Nations Human Rights Committee urged Senegal to legalize abortion as well as homosexuality.

During the presidency of Macky Sall, some supporters of abortion had hoped he would support legalization of abortion, while others were skeptical. In 2015, Sall said he may eventually support legalizing abortion in the cases of rape and incest. In January 2017, the League of Senegalese Ulama declared a fatwa against politicians supporting legalization. In 2020, only 20 of the 165 members of parliament supported it. Pro-abortion activists then paused activities for a few months.

=== Proposed medication abortion law (2024) ===
On 6 November 2013, the Task Force, which included eighteen organizations, published a petition to uphold the protocol. They argued that illegal abortion amplified inequality between women who could afford abortions from gynecologists and those who could not. AJS is part of this task force. Camara, as president of AJS, led a campaign to legalize medical abortion unconditionally up to twelve weeks of pregnancy.

Moustapha Diakhaté, head of the United in Hope party, voiced support for a law allowing medication abortion, saying it would decrease arrests and deaths. He worked with AJS to speak with politicians and civil society groups. The Task Force conducted a study on women incarcerated for abortion in 2022. In February 2023, the Task Force and Planned Parenthood led a discussion urging the president to bring the law in line with the Maputo Protocol. In Parliament, Diakhaté and Sokhna Ba supported their goal to decrease abortion-related incarceration.

On 2 February 2024, the National Assembly met to discuss medical abortion reform. The director of the advocacy committee for access to medical abortion in the cases of rape and incest, Aissatou Ndiaye, spoke about the importance of such a provision. Mame Guèye Diop, president of the National Assembly's Health Commission, said it was a "great occasion to review the legal outlines of reproductive health in Senegal, particularly medical abortion." J-GEN voiced its support for the advocacy.

The Task Force ran a campaign to gain the support of religious authorities but received strong opposition. It responded to religious backlash in a 2021 press release maintaining that it was "not about legalizing abortion" but that its goal was to save lives. The Caliph of the Tijaniyyah of Tivaouane, Serigne Babacar Sy, told the Minister of Interior he opposed the medication abortion reform. The League of Imams issued a statement opposing the law. Jamra was a major opponent. The Task Force spoke to Senegal's major religious families and gained support from many of them.

== Prevalence ==
In 2015–2019, there were 57,900 abortions in Senegal. Since 1990–1994, the unintended pregnancy had gone down 34%, and the share of unintended pregnancies resulting in abortion went from 17% to 25%. The abortion rate is 17 per 1,000 women, as of 2012. Dakar has the highest rate in the country, at 21 per 1,000 women. As of 2022, unsafe abortions are the fifth-leading cause of maternal mortality and comprise 50% of urgent maternity care. As of 2012, 5.5 per 1000 women of reproductive age experience abortion complications.

=== Methods ===
Nearly all abortions in Senegal are unsafe. As of 2012, 38% by are performed by untrained providers (including traditional healers), 21% are self-induced, 20% are by nurses or midwives, 17% are by doctors, and 4% are from pharmacies. The most common methods are drinking corrosives, drinking herbal mixtures, and surgical procedures. Though abortions by trained health professionals are safer than those that are not, they must work secretly, which increases risk. Complications are present in 22% of abortions performed by doctors and 35% of those by nurses and midwives. Gynecologists risk their careers to provide abortions. The Ministries of Health and Social Action have noted the commercialization of illegal abortions through online advertising. In 2022, a Facebook page advertised abortions for 27,000 francs.

Self-induced abortions are punishable by a fine of 50,000 to 1,000,000 francs and a prison sentence of six months to two years. Some women induce abortions with plants such as mbanté-maré, chemicals such as methylene blue, bleach, or wire. Some women punch themselves in the stomach or throw themselves off of stairs. Self-induced abortions have become more common since the internet has enabled women to find information about it. A pharmaceutical black market in Dakar's city center, Keur Serigne Bi, is a popular place to buy abortion pills. Customers can buy pills within minutes. The pills cost between 10,000 and 25,000 francs, and some are fake. Some women receive pills from pharmacies that do not work.

=== Societal factors ===
Abortion is stigmatized as the society values women's fertility. Women who seek abortions experience harassment and violence. Abortion is widely seen as a women's issue that is not a high priority. Its association with women's sexuality contributes to another taboo. Authors such as Mariama Bâ and Ken Bugul have written against the abortion stigma.

About 25% of married women have an unmet need for birth control. As of the 2010s, the average woman gives birth to one or two children more than desired. Birth control is uncommon as the topic is taboo, some husbands do not allow their wives to use it, and people have misconceptions about negative health effects. Many women are unaware of family planning in Senegal, especially in rural areas. Marie Stopes International (MSI) provides family planning services through mobile clinics, education sessions, and individual discussions. After the Mexico City policy was reinstated in January 2017, MSI and the UNFPA had U.S. funding cut off. Some women seek menstrual extraction as a way to prevent unwanted pregnancies that would require clandestine abortions. Many providers disapprove of the method for its similarity to abortion.

Sixty percent of illegal abortions are done on young women. Some who are unmarried or who were raped feel they have no other solution. Extramarital pregnancy and being raped are viewed as shameful and have caused families to disown their daughters. It is often difficult for rape victims to get abortions. According to the Family Child Guidance Center, 30% of people aged 7 to 14 who are sexually abused get pregnant, which often causes complications. The law does not classify incest as rape and does not allow victims of incest to abort their pregnancies. Abortions result in complications for 73% of poor rural women, 69% of poor urban women, 48% of nonpoor rural women, and 35% of nonpoor urban women, as of 2012. Poor women are less likely to be treated for complications.

=== Cases ===
The National Agency of Statistics and Demography of Senegal estimated that, in 2012, 25% of trials in felony court were of mothers charged with abortion–related crimes. In March 2011, a 14-year-old rape victim who got an abortion was arrested from the hospital. Camara called for the invocation of the Maputo Protocol. In 2014, a ten-year-old girl who had gotten pregnant from being raped by a neighbor was unable to get a legal abortion. Her mother, supported by AJS, brought the case to the state prosecutor, and the rapist was put in police custody. The girl gave birth to twins in February 2014.

== Post-abortion care ==
Most women who have abortions experience complications, but 42% of these do not receive care. Complications are more common among rural and poor women. Health centers, district hospitals, and regional hospitals provide most of the country's post-abortion care (PAC). As of 2012, 856 facilities provide PAC. Most private providers are in Dakar Region. Only 4% of PAC providers are private.

The MOH has recommended that manual vacuum aspiration, surgical aspiration, and misoprostol be available at every level of healthcare facilities. Surgical treatments are only available at tertiary and district hospitals. All levels of providers offer digital treatments and post-abortion family planning. Surgical procedures use MVA or, uncommonly, electric vacuum aspiration. Medical treatments typically involve administering 200 μg doses of misoprostol at the provider's discretion, up to two hours. Ultrasound is required to confirm the outcome of misoprostol treatment. MOH guidelines offer both surgical and medical treatments for pregnancies under 12 weeks, with surgical treatments prioritized for those under 9 weeks. Women can receive contraceptive pills, condoms, or hormonal implants immediately, as well as intrauterine devices after the procedure is confirmed complete. In Dakar, most clients are satisfied with the PAC they receive and experience short waiting times. Nearly half say the procedure is extremely painful, and only one-third receive pain relief. Private pharmacies are the main supplier of medications such as misoprostol. As of 2017, public health providers get it from pharmacies, despite the government's 2014 invitation to tender for misoprostol. Pharmacists in Dakar have low knowledge of misoprostol and its use. Few stock it because it is unavailable, or they do not want to stock an abortifacient drug.

MVA is less available at lower-level health facilities. These facilities must refer patients to higher facilities if the procedure is needed. Some health officials limit the use of MVA method, which may be used to induce abortion. Some PAC providers instead use methods such as digital curettage or dilation and curettage (D&C), which are condemned by the WHO. Relatively few use D&C. Digital evacuation is common among health workers who are not trained in MVA, face high caseloads, lack access to MVA supplies, or view the method as easier.

Providers and health officials view MVA as an integral part of PAC that can be used at lower levels of the health system by nurses. However, the MOH's supply system is centralized in Dakar, which limits implementation. Several NGOs work with the MOH to support PAC. Many receive funding from USAID, which does not allow providing abortion services besides PAC, according to policies such as the Helms Amendment and the Mexico City policy. Some NGO workers have argued that PAC "isn't enough". Health authorities view PAC as a way to combat the unsafe abortion rate without facing political opposition to abortion.

Health workers are not required to tell legal authorities about cases of illegal abortions. The medical code of ethics and the 2005 reproductive health law protect patient privacy. However, some report cases to authorities to avoid being accomplices or believe it is required. Most women treated for complications of illegal abortions do not receive police attention. Health workers perform an interrogation that determine the patient's medical history and the chances they induced an abortion. Many are suspicious of women who arrive alone or at night or who are unmarried. Most PAC cases are either labeled as cases of miscarriage, or are left unspecified and treated as presumptive miscarriages. Some health workers choose to label abortions as induced only if the patient says so, to maintain professional ethics. Others deliberately label abortions as miscarriages to avoid legal investigations.

In Dakar, as of 2021, the average out-of-pocket cost of PAC is 51,427 francs (US$93.84). The cost is 66,020 francs ($120.47) in hospitals and 35,880 francs ($65.47) in health centers. Many clients are charged multiple payments. Most do not face waiting periods. The high cost leads to lower use of services, especially among poorer people. As of 2016, the average cost per patient for health facilities in Senegal is 15,814 francs ($26.68). Direct costs of staff and supplies comprise 64% of this cost. Direct costs are higher for severe complications. The remaining costs consist of constructing, equipping, and administrating a facility, which are higher for private facilities. That year, the estimated total cost to the health system of PAC was 275.6 million francs ($464,928).

=== History ===
Before Senegal's health system introduced PAC, the most common methods of uterine evacuation were D&C and digital curettage. Senegal, along with Burkina Faso, was one of the first countries in the region to decentralize post-abortion care from urban tertiary care centers to rural hospitals. It is known as a success story and the "PAC pioneer of West Africa". In the late 1990s, after the ratification of the ICPD, USAID supported the MOH in introducing PAC. It was part of the Ministry's strategy to reduce maternal mortality, which became government policy in the 1980s. PAC was introduced in 1997. The Ministry funded research into decentralizing PAC, which demonstrated effective use of MVA, followed by the use of medications to treat complications.

The MOH introduced MVA to more hospitals in a 2000–2002 collaboration with EngenderHealth and a 2003–2006 collaboration with Management Sciences for Health. The MOH developed an MVA distribution scheme independent of the Pharmacie Nationale d’Approvisionnement (transl. National Supply Pharmacy). The MVA training was limited to theoretical training for doctors and midwives at district and regional hospitals. Most public reproductive health facilities had been trained by 2006.

== Infanticide ==
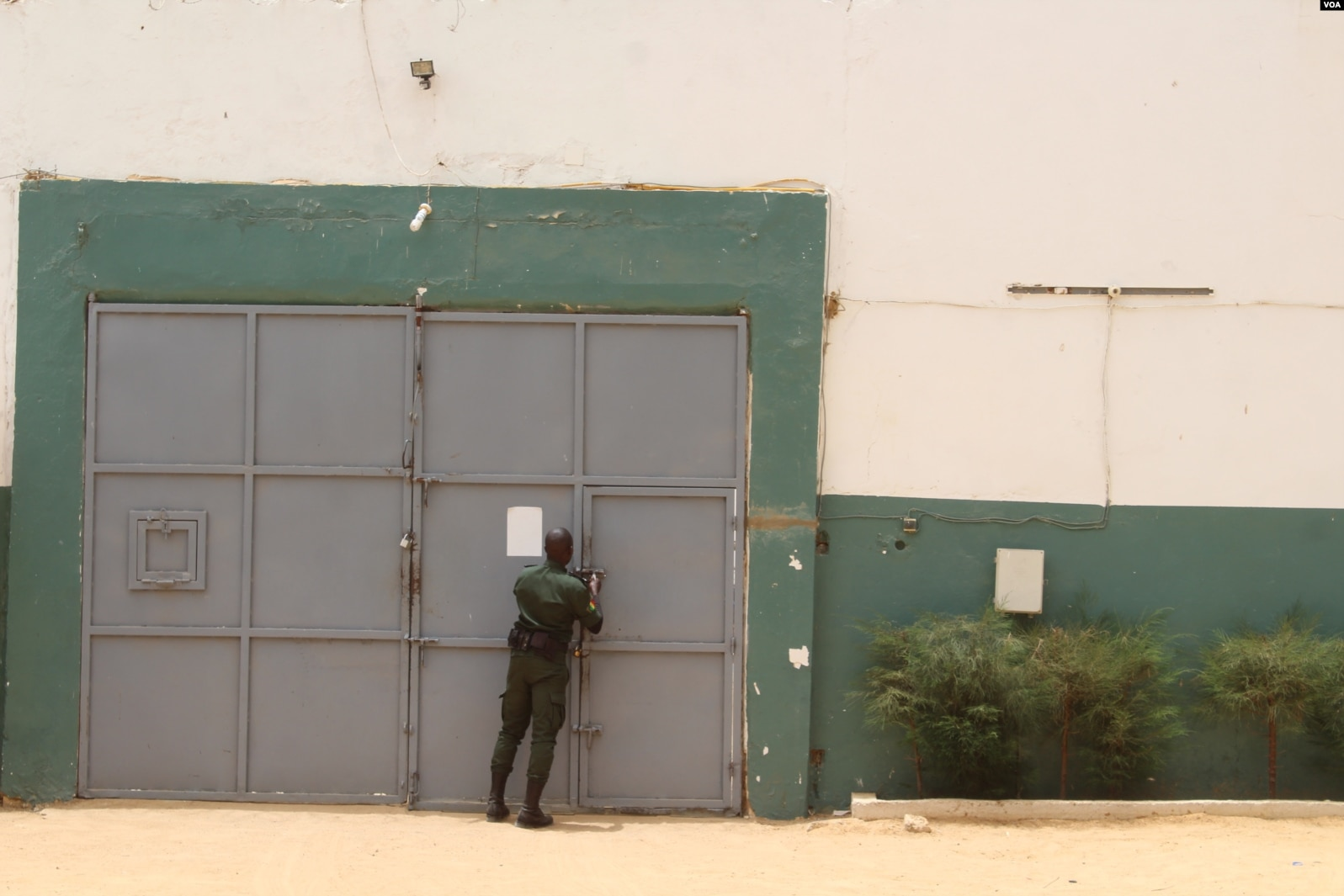
The prison in Thiès, where many women are detained on charges of infanticide

Some women who cannot get abortions commit infanticide. Some drown their babies in septic tanks or wells, strangle them, or starve them. The company that runs Dakar's Mbeubeuss Landfill discovered 39 infant corpses there in 2021. In February 2017, newborn corpses were found in the parking lot of Dakar's Léopold Sédar Senghor Stadium and at the market in Pikine. Media reports contribute to widespread awareness of infanticide. Rumors and suspicions of infanticide are common. The public condemns infanticide but largely understands its motivations.

According to a WHO report, infanticide comprise 38% of cases of detained women. The AJS found in 2015 that 19% of detained women were charged with infanticide, and 3% with abortion. In 2020, 43 women were prosecuted for either offense. In April 2022, 16 of the 83 inmates at Liberté-VI prison were charged with infanticide. In March 2018, 40% of the 58 women in the prison in Thiès were charged with infanticide. The typical jail sentence for infanticide is five years. It is the second-leading cause of imprisonment for women in Senegal.

Abortion rights groups such as the AJS and the MOH attribute infanticide to the lack of birth control and legal abortion. Some attribute it to religious, rather than legal, opposition to abortion. Infanticides are motivated by situations of rape, incest, forced marriages, poverty, adultery, and social hostility. Authorities say absent husbands are a factor. Women whose husbands leave the country often have extramarital relations that lead to unwanted pregnancies. Infanticide is more common in rural areas that are dense or have low literacy. In Dakar, as of 2006, the most likely women to be arrested for abortion or infanticide are below 25, have little education, are in polygamous marriages, are from poor peri-urban areas, or have experienced trauma. Few women in rural Senegal are aware of the country's few orphanages.

== See also ==
- Gender equality in Senegal
- Health in Senegal
- Human rights in Senegal
