= Codou Bop =

Senegalese sociologist, journalist and women's rights activist

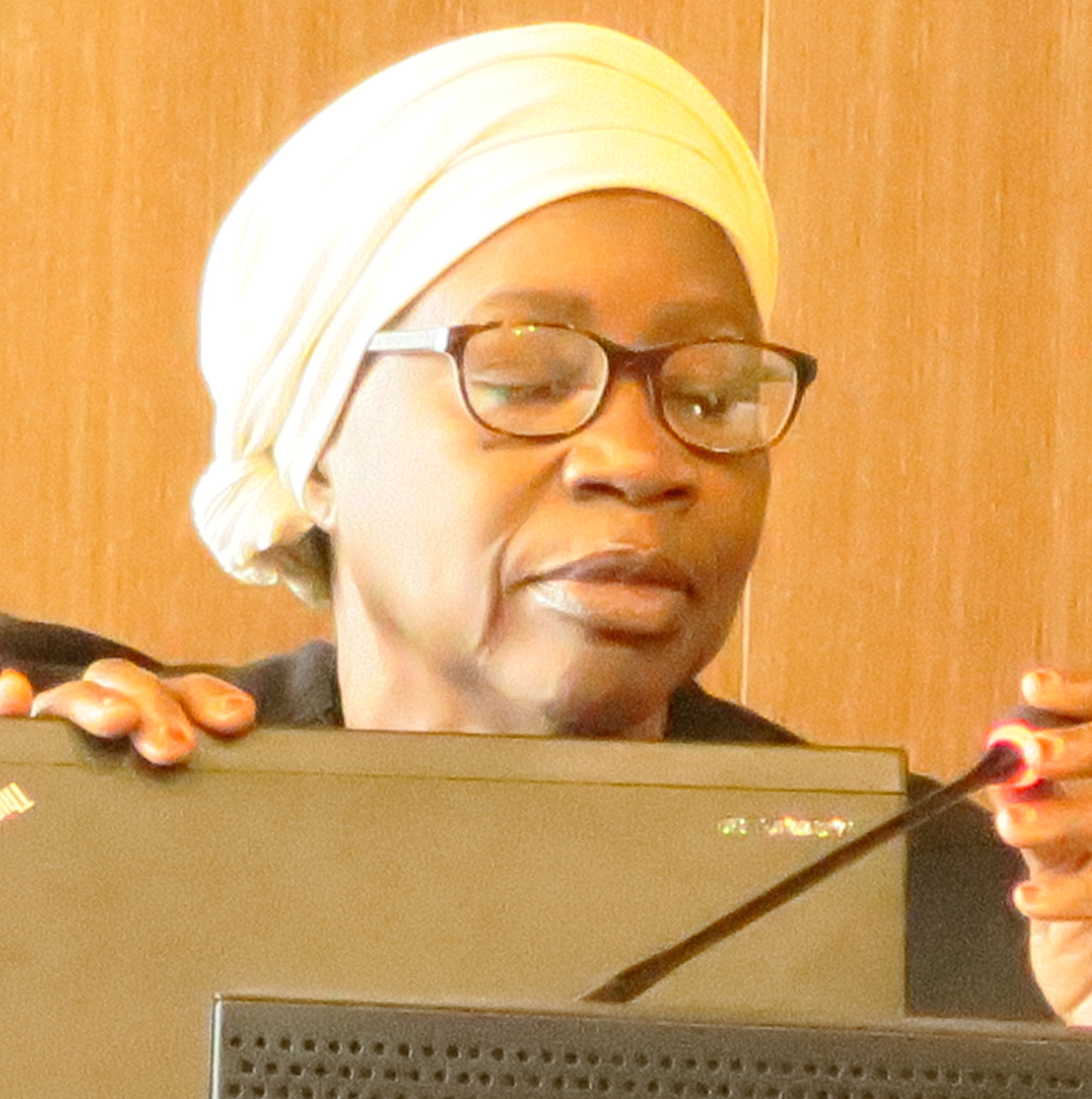
- Occupations: Sociologist, journalist

Codou Bop is a Senegalese sociologist, journalist and women's rights activist who also engages against gender violence in Sub-Saharan Africa.

== Biography ==
While she was working as a journalist in Dakar in 2005, Bop made a study about the role of women in the Senegalese press (Le Quotidien, Le Soleil, Wal Fadjri and dispatches of AFP). She showed that women are present on only 8 percent of the newspaper front pages but are over-represented in crime and gossip news.

Bop is the coordinator of the Women and Law Research Group in Senegal (GREFELS) which is part of the regional coordination office of Women Living Under Muslim Laws for Africa and the Middle East.

In 2004, she edited the book Notre corps, notre santé. La santé sexuelle des femmes en Afrique subsaharienne alongside Fatou Sow. It was the first book intended for Sub-Saharan African women that deals with their bodies and sexuality. It was published when the AIDS pandemic affected women in Francophone Africa. It included contributions from former Minister of Health Awa Marie Coll-Seck, historian Penda Mbow and from physicians, biologists, sociologists, jurists and journalists. The book was distributed in 21 Sub-Saharan African countries and excerpts were made available online.

== Published works ==
- Codou Bop, Réseau de recherche en santé de la reproduction en Afrique, Notre corps, notre santé : la santé et la sexualité des femmes en Afrique subsaharienne, Paris, L'Harmattan, 2004, 364 p.
- Codou Bop, La presse féminine au Sénégal, Dakar, 1978, 45 p.
- Codou Bop, Les femmes chefs de ménage à Dakar, Dakar, Afrique et Développement, 1995
- Codou Bop, L'excision : base de la stabilité familiale ou rituel cruel, Dakar, Famille et Développement, 1975
- Codou Bop, L'ajustement structurel féminise l'exode rural, 1995
- Codou Bop, Tidiane Kassé, Afrique de l'Ouest: réguler l'information en situation de conflit, Institut Panos Afrique de l'Ouest, 2004, 143 p.
- Codou Bop, Planification familiale en Afrique et droits des femmes en matière de procréation, Paris, La Découverte, 1995, 143 p.
- Islam and Women’s Sexual Health and Rights in Senegal” in Islam and Human Rights: Advocacy for Social Change in Local Contexts, Global Media Publications, 2006.
