= Human rights in Senegal =

Human rights in Senegal are generally better respected than in other countries in the continent, but cases of violation are still regularly reported.

According to Amnesty International, in 2022 freedom of assembly and freedom of expression were restricted in Senegal.

== History ==
The death penalty was abolished in 2004.

In March 2011, the ECOWAS Court of Justice asked Senegalese authorities to repeal Ministerial Order no. 7580, which prohibits "demonstrations of a political nature" in Dakar. As of December 2022, the order has not been repealed.

During protests in June 2022, authorities were alleged to have tortured a detained protester, resulting in his death; as of December 2022, an investigation into his death had not been opened.

== Children's rights ==
Since the 2010s, reports have indicated that talibés, Senegalese children living in daaras, a type of Quranic school, have been subject to exploitation, neglect, and abuse. According to Human Rights Watch, as of 2019 around 100,000 talibes are forced to beg daily for food and money.

Legislation has been proposed to overhaul the country's daara system, which as of 2022 has not been passed.

== See also ==
- Gender equality in Senegal
- Media of Senegal
- List of newspapers in Senegal
- Politics of Senegal
- Casamance conflict

== Bibliography ==
- (in German) Kafui Ayaba Sandra Afanou, Der Menschenrechtsschutz in drei ausgewählten frankophonen Staaten Afrikas : Togo, Senegal und Kamerun, Frankfurt-sur-le-Main, Berlin, Berne, Brussels, New York, Oxford and Vienna, Lang, 2005, 228 p. (after a thesis at the University of Heidelberg, 2002) ISBN 3-631-51392-5
- (in English) James T. Lawrence (editor), Human rights in Africa Hauppauge, N.Y., Nova Science, 2004, 252 p. ISBN 1590339320
- (in French) Sidiki Kaba, Les droits de l'homme au Sénégal, Collection Xaam saa yoon, 1997, 547 p.
- (in French) Comité interministériel chargé des droits de l'homme, Le Sénégal face aux allégations de violation des droits de l'homme, 1996, 26 p.
