= Fatoumata =

Fatoumata is a West African feminine given name. Notable people include:

- Fatoumata Bagayoko (born 1988), Malian basketball player
- Fatoumata Coly (born 1984), Senegalese sprinter
- Fatoumata Coulibaly, Malian actress and women's rights activist
- Fatoumata Dembélé Diarra (born 1949), Malian lawyer and judge
- Fatoumata Diawara (born 1982), Malian musician
- Fatoumata Diop (born 1986), Senegalese sprinter
- Fatoumata Kaba (journalist) (born 1969), Guinean journalist
- Fatoumata Koné (born 1988), Ivorian basketball player
- Fatoumata Nafo-Traoré, Malian public health official
- Fatoumata Ndiaye (born 1989), Malian Equatoguinean-born footballer
- Fatoumata Samassékou (born 1987), Malian swimmer
- Fatoumata Tambajang (born 1949), Gambian politician

== See also ==
- Fatou (disambiguation)
- Fatu (disambiguation)
