= Mass media in Senegal =

The mass media in Senegal is varied and includes multiple television channels, numerous private radio stations, and over 15 newspapers.

== Print media ==
=== Newspapers ===
The reading public for Senegal's diverse press is largely limited to Dakar and Thies. The quasi-official Le Soleil is a daily newspaper. Other major popular independent newspapers include the dailies Sud Quotidien, WalFadjri, Le Quotidien, Le Matin, Le Populaire, Il Est Midi, and the economic weekly Nouvel Horizon. National newspapers are in French. English-language newspapers such as the International Herald Tribune are also available at many newsstands.

Various trade organizations publish bulletins and newsletters such as those of the Dakar Chamber of Commerce and the periodical Entreprendre issued by the National Council of Business Leaders.

=== Magazines ===
Several Europe-based magazines enjoy a wide circulation, including Jeune Afrique, L'Autre Afrique, Paris Match, L'Express, Le Point, as well as the European editions of Time, Newsweek and The Economist.

== See also ==
- List of radio stations in Senegal
- List of radio stations in Africa
- Radiodiffusion Télévision Sénégalaise, the Senegalese public broadcasting company
- Telecommunications in Senegal
- Internet censorship and surveillance in Senegal
- Cinema of Senegal

== Bibliography ==
- Rian Van den Wijngaard (1992). "Women As Journalists: Incompatibility of Roles?". Africa Media Review. 6 (2). Archived from the original on 2020-11-21 – via Michigan State University Libraries, African e-Journals Project. (About Senegal)
- "Senegal: Directory: Broadcasting and Communications". Africa South of the Sahara 2004. Regional Surveys of the World. Europa Publications. 2004. p. 950. ISBN 1857431839.
- Jonathon Green; Nicholas J. Karolides (2005). "Senegal". Encyclopedia of Censorship. Facts on File, Inc. ISBN 978-1-4381-1001-1.
- "Senegal", Freedom of the Press, USA: Freedom House, 2016, OCLC 57509361
