= Maria Isaura Pereira de Queiróz =

Brazilian sociologist (1918–2018)

Maria Isaura Pereira de Queiroz (August 26, 1918 – December 29, 2018) was a Brazilian sociologist.

== Biography ==
She obtained her degree in Social Sciences from the University of São Paulo (1949), Diploma of Graduate Studies in sociology, anthropology and politics from the University of São Paulo (1951) and a doctorate degree in sociology from the École pratique des hautes études Section VI (1959).

Her dissertation is titled: La Guerre Sainte au Brésil: le Mouvement Messianique du Contestado, (in English: "The Holy War in Brazil: the Messianic Movement of Contestado") under the direction of Roger Bastide, 1960. Her dissertation was published by the University of São Paulo with the title: "Le Messianisme au Brésil et dans au Monde", in 1963. Her works are referenced worldwide.

Her last position was as professor at the Centro de Estudos Rurais e Urbanos (in English: Center for Urban and Rural Studies), which she founded, and was professor emeritus at the University of São Paulo.

Pereira de Queiróz spoke or understood the following languages: Spanish, French, English and Italian. She died in December 2018 at the age of 100.

== Visiting Professor ==
- 1953: Universidade Federal do Paraná, UFPR, Brazil
- 1959: Fundação Escola de Sociologia e Política de São Paulo, FESPSP, Brazil
- 1963 - 1964: Université de Paris VI (Pierre et Marie Curie), UP VI, France
- 1964: Laval University, U L, Quebec
- 1969: Universidade Federal da Bahia, UFBA, Brazil
- 1970 Universidade Federal de Santa Catarina, UFSC, Brazil
- 1978 - 1979: Université de Paris III (Sorbonne-Nouvelle), U P III, France
- 1979: Université des Mutants, U M, Senegal
- 1980: Université de Louvain La Neuve, U LN, Belgium

== Awards and distinctions ==
- 1957: XI Concurso Mário de Andrade de Monografias Sobre Folclore, Departamento de Cultura do Município de São Paulo.
- 1966: Prêmio Jabuti - Melhor Obra de Ciências Sociais, Câmara Brasileira do Livro.
- 1990: Professora Emérita da Universidade de São Paulo, Universidade de São Paulo.
- 1997: Prêmio Almirante Álavaro Alberto para Ciência e Tecnologia - Cientista do Ano, Centro Nacional de Desenvolvimento Científico e Tecnológico - Ministério de Ciência e Tecnologia.
- 1999: Prêmio Multicultural Estadão, O Estado de São Paulo.

== Bibliography ==
- with Roger Bastide: « ensaios e pesquisa » São Paulo : centro de estudos rurais e urbanos, textos, n 5, 1994
- Li cangaceiros: i banditi d'onore Napoli : liguori ed, 1993
- « O imaginário em terra conquistada » São Paulo : centro de estudos rurais e urbanos, 1993 V 4 146 p
- Carnaval brasileiro: o vivido e o mito São Paulo : brasiliense, 1992
- Os cangaceiros: la epopeya bandolera del nordeste del brasil Bogotá: el áncora, 1992
- Carnaval brésilien : le vécu et le mythe Paris: gallimard ed, 1992
- Variações sobre a técnica de gravador no registro da informação viva São Paulo: ceru/fflch/usp (coleção textos, 4), 1983
- with Roger Bastide : uma antologia São Paulo: ed Ática, 1983
- História do cangaço São Paulo: ed Global, 1982
- Cultura, sociedade rural e sociedade urbana no brasil Rio de Janeiro: livros técnicos e científicos/edusp, 1978
- Cultura, sociedade rural e sociedade urbana São Paulo: livros técnicos e ciêntíficos/edusp, 1978
- Os cangaceiros São Paulo: duas cidades, 1977
- Bairros rurais paulistas (dinâmica das relações bairro rural/cidade) São Paulo: duas cidades, 1973
- O campesinato brasileiro (ensaios sobre civilização e grupos rústicos no brasil) Petrópolis: vozes, 1973
- Reform and revolution in tradicionnal societies New york: Harper and Row, 1971
- Images messianiques du brésil Cidade do méxico: ed Cidoc-sondeos, 1971
- O mandonismo local na vida política do brasil São Paulo: institutos de estudos brasileiros/usp, 1970
- Riforma e rivoluzione nelle societá tradizionale Milão: edizione jaca book, 1970
- Réforme et révolution dans les sociétés traditionnelles Paris: ed Anthropos, 1969
- Los movimentos mesiánicos Cidade do méxico: siglo veintiuno editores, 1969
- Os cangaceiros: les bandits d'honneur brésilliens Paris: ed Julliard, 1968
- O messiamismo no brasil e no mundo São Paulo: dominus/edusp, 1965
- Sociologia e folclore: a dança de são gonçalo num povoado baiano Salvador: livraria progresso, 1958
- La guerre sainte au brésil: le mouvemente messianique du contestado São Paulo: faculdade de filosofia, ciências e letras - usp, 1957

=== See also ===
- Collective memory
- Folklore
