= Le Quotidien =

Le Quotidien (English: The Daily) can refer to

- Le Quotidien (Saguenay), Canadian newspaper
- Le Quotidien, a daily newspaper of Cartel des Gauches, France, between the World Wars
- Le Quotidien de Paris, French newspaper
- Le Quotidien (Senegal), Senegalese newspaper
- Le Quotidien (Luxembourg), French-language newspaper published in Luxembourg

See also

- Quotidien, French television programme
