= Dakaractu =

Senegalese online news website

- Website type: News website
- Available in: French
- Website: Dakaractu.com
- Launched: 2011
- Current status: Active

Dakaractu is a Senegalese online news web portal that covers national and international topics, including politics, society, the economy, and culture. Founded in 2011, it has been cited by regional and international news organizations such as RFI and Jeune Afrique. According to Courrier international, Dakaractu is listed as a news source in its media directory.

== History ==
Dakaractu was launched in July 2011 by journalist Cheikh Yérim Seck as a web-based news platform focused on current affairs in Senegal.

== Content ==
The website publishes news reports, political coverage, and commentary on public affairs. Dakaractu has also been cited by the Senegalese Press Agency (APS), the country's national news agency founded in 1959.

== See also ==
- Media of Senegal
