= Berres =

Berres is a surname. Notable people with the surname include:

- Christian Joseph Berres (1796–1844), Austrian anatomist
- Heinz-Edgar Berres (1920–1943), German World War II flying ace
- Luis Batlle Berres (1897–1964), Uruguayan politician
- Mathias J. Berres (1863–1954), American politician
- Ray Berres (1907–2007), American baseball player and coach

== See also ==
- Berre (disambiguation)
