= Berre =

Berre may refer to:

== Places and geographical features ==
- Étang de Berre, a lagoon on the Mediterranean coast of France
- Berre-l'Étang, a commune in the Bouches-du-Rhône department in southern France
- Berre-les-Alpes, a commune in the Alpes-Maritimes department in southeastern France
- Berre (Aude), a coastal river in the Aude department, France
- Berre (Rhône), a tributary of the Rhône in the Drôme department, France
- Paros, a Greek island, called Berre during Turkish rule

== People ==
- André Dieudonné Berre (born 1940), Gabonese politician
- Berre Vandenbussche (born 2000), Belgian musician, from Schepdaal
- Cecilia Fatou-Berre (1901–1989), African nun
- Enrico Berrè (born 1992), Italian fencer
- Inga Berre (born 1978), Norwegian mathematician
- Jacques le Berré (born 1937), French judoka
- Joseph Owondault Berre, Gabonese politician and engineer
- Marcel Berré (1882–1957), Belgian fencer
- Morten Berre (born 1975), Norwegian footballer
- Nicolas le Berre (born 1976), French yachtsman
- Philippe Berre (born 1954), French confidence man
