= Seneweb.com =

Web portal geared to the Senegalese community

Seneweb
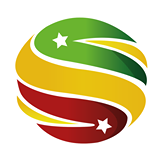
- Website type: Generalist
- Available in: French
- Owner: Abdoulaye Salam Madior Fall
- Website: Seneweb.com
- Launched: 2000
- Current status: Active

Seneweb.com is a web portal with content mainly geared to the Senegalese community in both Senegal and around the world.

== History ==
Seneweb was founded in 1999 by Abdoulaye Salam Madior Fall. In 2000 Daouda Mbaye became the Co-owner of Seneweb.

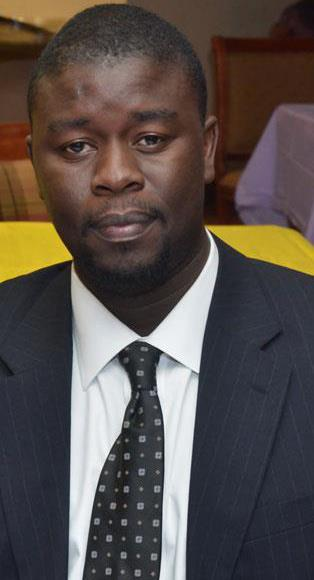
PDG Seneweb Abdou Salam Madior Fall.

Within a few months, the site knows resounding success especially among the Senegalese diaspora. The number of Internet-connected in Senegal did not exceed 40,000 in 2000. It was one of the few web sites to cover the presidential election campaign. As well as news, it hosts streaming video and audio and political forums.

A few years after its inception, the portal has become one of the most visited in Francophone West Africa.

Seneweb is also classified as the 2,176th site of the most visited websites on the internet from 234 million worldwide, according to Alexa. Seneweb receives on average per month more than 4,000,000 (four million) of visitors and over thirty million page views per month. The majority of visitors come respectively from Senegal, France, the United States and other African countries.
In July 2015 Seneweb launches mobile application available on Appstore and Playstore.

Member	Position
Abdou Salam Madior Fall	CEO & Founder
Daouda Mbaye	Co-owner
Demba Makalou	Manager
Daouda Mine	Chief Editor
Moustapha Ndiaye	Content Coordinator
Demba Gueye	Editor
Raphael Senghor	Project chief/Programmer
Basile Niane	Blogger
Mamadou Mansour Diop	Editor/Community Manager

== See also ==
- Media of Senegal
