= Manneh =

Manneh may refer to the following people:

- Mane people
- Alasana Manneh (born 1998), Gambian footballer
- Awa Manneh (born 1982), Swedish R&B/soul singer
- Ebrima Manneh, Gambian journalist
- Fatou Jaw-Manneh, Gambian journalist and activist
- Kekuta Manneh (born 1994), Gambian football striker
- Maad a Sinig Maysa Wali Jaxateh Manneh, 14th century African king
- Ousman Manneh (born 1997), Gambian football striker
- Kalifa Manneh (born 1998), Gambian football winger
