= Wolofization =

Adoption of Wolof language and culture

Wolofization or Wolofisation is a cultural and language shift whereby populations or states adopt Wolof language or culture, such as in the Senegambia region. In Senegal, Wolof is a lingua franca The Wolofization phenomenon has taken over all facets of Senegal and encroaching on Gambian soil. This phenomenon has caused other Senegambian ethnic groups great concern and resulted in taking steps to preserve their languages and culture. In this regard, the Serer ethnic group who have had a long history fighting against Islamization and Wolofization have been taking active steps in the past decades by setting up associations and other organisations in order to preserve their languages, culture and "ancient religious past." Haalpulaar speakers, namely the Fula and Toucouleur have also been taking steps to preserve their language.

== Pros ==
Many people argue that since Wolof is the lingua franca in Senegal, it should be the official language.

== Criticism ==
The Wolofization phenomenon taking place in Senegal and encroaching on Gambian soil has been criticised by many Serer, Mandinka and Haalpulaar (Fula and Toucouleur) intellectuals. Serer historian and author Babacar Sedikh Diouf view Wolofization as destructive to the languages and cultures of the other Senegambian ethnic groups such as Serer, Jola, Mandinka, Fula, etc., and calls for a "controlled osmosis" between Wolof and other ethnicities. In his view, Diouf regards Wolofization as a form of “uncontrolled” homogenization of Senegal by the Wolof. His fellow Serer intellectual Marcel Mahawa Diouf, along with Mandinaka intellectual Doudou Kamara, and Haalpulaar intellectuals Yoro Doro Diallo and Cheikh Hamidou Kane share Diouf's sentiments. The historian and author Marcel Mahawa Diouf offers a more drastic solution for dealing with the "Wolofization problem". Since the Wolof are a mixture of the various ethnic groups of the Senegambia region, and that, even their language (the Wolof language) is not actually the language of the Wolof in origin, but the original language of the Lebu people, Marcel Mahawa calls for an alliance between all non-Wolofs who have had historic alliances with each other. In effect, that would be the Serers, Toucouleurs, Soninke people (Sarakolés), Sossés (Mandinka), Jola, and Lebou. The sole purpose of revisiting these ancient alliances (where one tribe calls for help and another answers, commonly known in Senegambia as gamo, from the old Serer term gamohou or gamahou ("to find the lost heart", itself an ancient Serer religious festival) is to disconnect the Wolof thereby disinheriting them from the Senegambia region and its history.

== See also ==
- Languages of Senegal
- Languages of the Gambia
- Casamance conflict
