= List of radio stations in Senegal =

This is a list of radio stations in Senegal.

- Afri4
- AlloDakar Radio TamTam
- Asfiyahi FM, a Tijaniyyah radio station.
- Dakar Musique
- H24 Radio
- iRadio, run by Seneweb.
- Kaffrine FM, focuses on the Kaffrine area.
- Lamp Fall FM, Mouride radio station.
- Maack FM, focuses on news relating to the diaspora.
- MedinaCheikh Radio, a Tijaniyyah radio station.
- Mozdahir FM 93.2 (in Guédiawaye, Dakar), radio station of international NGO Mozdahir.
- Radio Ndef Leng — Officially launched on 19 July 2001, is a Serer radio station broadcasting in the Serer languages - namely Serer-Siin or Seh and the Cangin languages. Following its formation under the name Ndef Leng FM Dakar 93.4, other Serer radio stations using the "Ndef Leng" brand followed suit throughout Serer country, in Senegal, including Ndef Leng FM Fatick 93.5, Radio Ndef Leng Diourbel 96.4 FM, etc. The station offers a mixture of on air debate, discussions and educational programmes in the Serer languages (Serer and Cangin), Wolof and French. The station also has its own listener club. As of 2017, the Seereer Resource Centre in collaboration with its radio station—Seereer Radio became joint sponsors of Radio Ndef Leng Diourbel 96.4 FM—thereby allowing the station to reach a much wider listenership through their podcast and on-air replays.
- Pikine Diaspora Radio
- Pulaar Speaking Radio, a French-language radio station for promoting Fulfulde and Fulani culture.
- Radio Aanyam, African Liberation Forces of Mauritania radio station.
- Radio Al Fayda
- Radio Baol Médias FM, community radio created in partnership with UNESCO.
- Radio Dakar City
- Radio Dingiral Fulbe, programs for the Fulbe and also has a program in Soninke.
- Radio Faydatidianiya, Islamic radio station.
- Radio Futurs (Medias), Futurs Médias group station.
- Radio Medinabaye Kaffrine, Islamic radio station.
- Radio Sunuker, radio station run by Sunuker.com.
- Radio Tetiane, radio station for the Fulbe diaspora.
- Radio Thiossane
- Sama Radio, pop music radio station.
- Seereer Radio — is a Serer radio station that broadcast for the Serer community throughout the diaspora with its online and podcast platforms. The station broadcast in Serer, Saafi-Saafi, Wolof, English and French. It was formed on 16 November 2015 by the Seereer Resource Centre and officially launched on 5 January 2016. It is a mixture of talk, music and interview station with emphasis on entertainment and education. Over the years, it has interviewed many notable Senegambian personalities including scholars, entertainers and sports—people. It's Cosaan Seereer (a Serer catch all term meaning Serer history, culture and religion) programme is an extension of the Seereer Resource Centre's objectives in documenting and preserving Serer history, culture and traditions.
- Sud FM, pop music radio station.
- Vibe Radio
- Walf FM
- West Africa Democracy Radio
- Xamsadine, Islamic radio station founded by the Senegalese diaspora in the United States.
- Xassida Online, Mouride radio station broadcasting khassida (Wolof: xassida), religious poems dedicated to Muhammad written by Amadou Bamba.
- Zahra FM, in Kolda. The radio station is owned by Cherif Mohamed Aly Aidara, founder and president of the NGO Mozdahir, and a major Shia religious leader in Senegal.

== See also ==
- Media in Senegal
- List of newspapers in Senegal
- List of radio stations in Africa
