= Fatou Sow (sociologist) =

Senegalese feminist sociologist

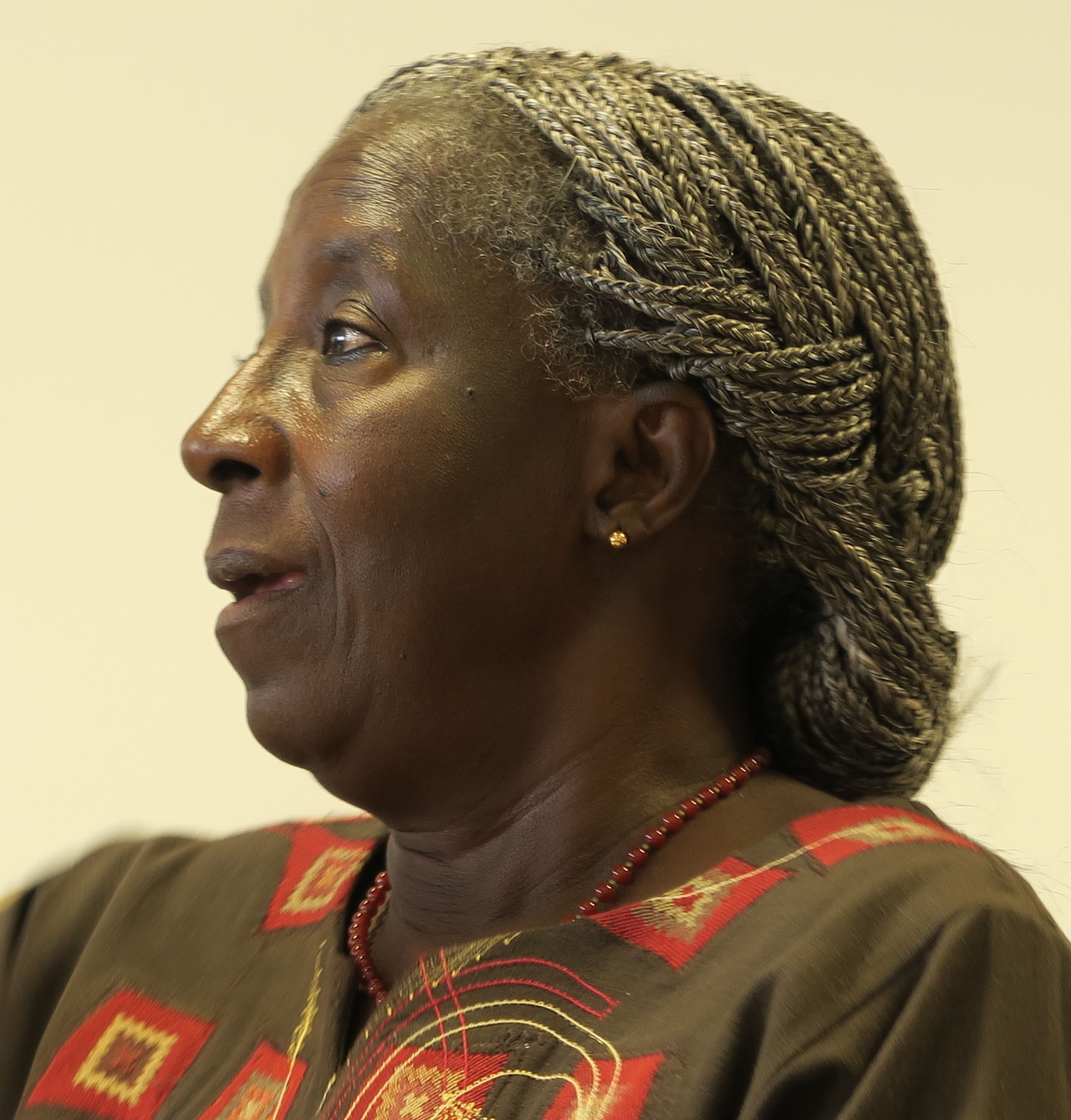
- Born: 1941 (age 84–85); Dakar, Senegal
- Occupation: Sociologist
- Employer(s): Cheikh Anta Diop University; Fundamental Institute of Black Africa

Fatou Sow (born 1941) is a Senegalese feminist sociologist specialising in sociology of gender.

== Life and career ==
After Senegal gained independence in 1960, Sow was one of the first women to attend a university in the country. After she defended a thesis about the Senegalese elite, she kept researching in sociology.

Sow became a professor at the Cheikh Anta Diop University in Dakar. In the late 1980, she created the programme for Gender Education of the Council for the Development of Social Science Research in Africa. In 1999, she organised the second International Congress for Feminist Research in Francophone Countries.

In 1993, she became a research fellow of the French National Center for Scientific Research (CNRS) at the Paris Diderot University, in a research unit established by Catherine Coquery-Vidrovitch.

Sow participated in bringing gender-related studies to African research institutes and universities, and in raising awareness about the claims of African women's associations. She also developed partnerships with American universities.

She is the head of the Gender Laboratory of the Dakar-based Fundamental Institute of Black Africa.

Besides her researching career, Sow is a coordinator of the Femmes sous lois musulmanes (Women under Muslim law) network for West Africa and of the Development Alternatives with Women for a New Era, an organisation that works with international institutions.

== Works ==
- 2005: "Les femmes, l’État et le sacré", in L’islam politique au Sud du Sahara. Identités, discours et enjeux, M. Gomez-Perez (ed.). Paris: Karthala.
- 2005: "Penser les femmes et l’islam en Afrique : une approche féministe", contribution to Mama Africa. Mélanges offerts à Catherine Coquery-Vidrovitch. Paris: L’Harmattan.
- 2005: "Mobilisation des femmes en Afrique de l’Ouest", in Gender Equality. Striving for Justice in an Unequal World, UNRISD, Geneva.
- 2004: Notre corps, notre santé : la santé et la sexualité des femmes en Afrique subsaharienne, Fatou Sow and Codou Bop (eds.). Paris, L’Harmattan.
- 2002: Sexe, genre et société : Engendrer les sciences sociales africaines, A. Imam, A. Mama, F. Sow (eds.), Fatou Sow's French translation of Engendering African social sciences. Dakar: CODESRIA/Karthala.
- 2002: La marchandisation de la gouvernance, Fatou Sow's French translation of Marketisation of Governance, Viviene Taylor (ed.). Paris: DAWN-L’Harmattan
