= Fatou Keïta =

Ivorian writer

Fatou Keïta (born 1965) is an Ivorian writer of children's books and novels.

== Education and career ==
Born in Soubré in Ivory Coast, Fatou Keïta had her primary education in Bordeaux, where her father was studying surgery. She subsequently went to high school in Bouaké, where she gained her baccalaureate in 1974. In 1981, she graduated from the University of Côte d'Ivoire, and did further studies in England and the United States. In 1995 she won a Fulbright Scholarship and went to the University of Virginia at Charlottesville to research Black African women writers in the US as well as in England. She went on to become a lecturer in the English Department of the Université de Cocody.

She has won awards for her writings for children. Her first novel, Rebelle (1998), deals with female genital cutting.

== Awards and honours ==
- 1994, Le petit garçon bleu, First Prize, literary competition for Children's Books organised by the ACCT
- 1997, Le petit garçon bleu, commendation, UNESCO Prize
- Le petit garçon bleu, Ivory Coast Prize for Excellence
- 1995, Fulbright Scholarship
- Le Coq qui ne voulait plus chanter (NEI 1999), Prix Enfance, Association of Ivory Coast Writers
- 2008, Le Loup du Petit Chaperon Rouge en Afrique (NEI/CEDA 2007), Mention Honorable, NOMA Prize

== Bibliography ==
- 1996: Le petit garçon en bleu, La voleuse de sourires, Sibani la petite dernière
- 1998: Rebelle
- 1999: Le coq qui ne voulait plus chanter
- 2002: Le billet de 10 000 F
- 2004: Un arbre pour Lollie
- 2006: Et l'aube se leva…
- 2009: Le chien qui aimait les chats!
- 2011: La petite pièce de monnaie
