= Sister Fa =

Senegalese singer and activist

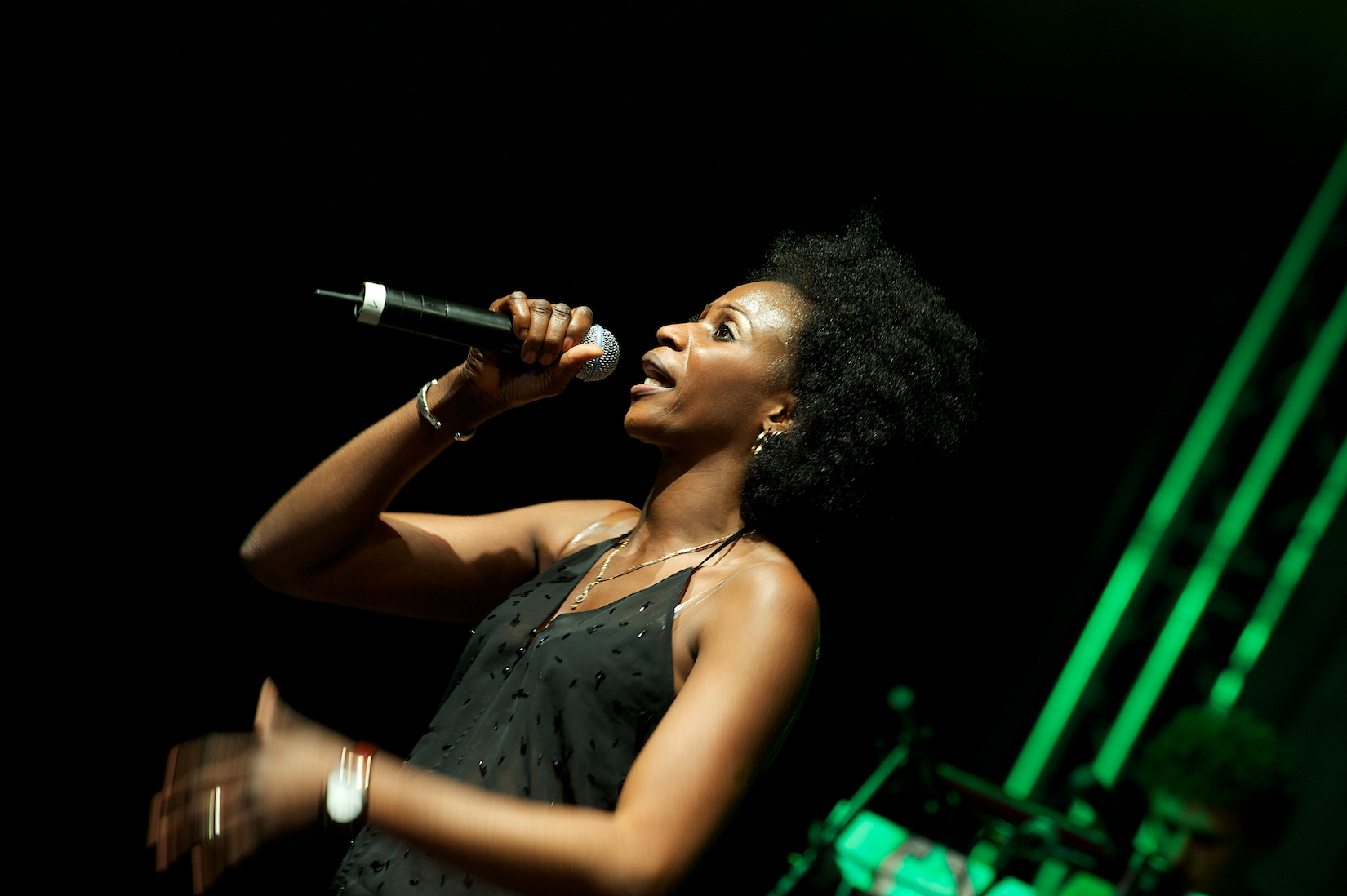
- Sister Fa in 2010

Background information
- Born: Fatou Diatta; 1982 (age 43–44); Dakar, Senegal
- Genres: Rap

Sister Fa (real name Fatou Diatta, born 1982 in Dakar, Senegal) is a Senegalese rapper and anti-female genital mutilation (FGM) activist.

== Career ==
Diatta began her career as a rapper in 2000, when she made her first demo tape. The following year, she performed at the Senegal Hip Hop Awards. In 2005, she released her first album, Hip Hop Yaw Law Fal. In 2008, she toured Senegal to raise awareness of the problem of FGM. In 2009, she released her international debut album Sarabah: Tales From the Flipside of Paradise. In 2011, Sarabah, a documentary about Diatta's tour Education Sans Excision (French for Education without Cutting), premiered at the human rights festival Movies That Matter.

== Critical reception ==
Sarabah: Tales From the Flipside of Paradise received a lukewarm review from Jon Lusk of the BBC, who wrote that "too much of the album consists of fairly pedestrian or annoyingly sing-songy melodies that echo playground chants (like Poum Poum Pa) or seem transparently aimed at the ring tone market." In The Daily Telegraph, Mark Hudson gave the album 3 out of 5 stars and wrote that Diatta "pits her gutsy verbalising against exquisite traditional melodies on this well-crafted debut." Rick Anderson reviewed the album for Allmusic, concluding that "It's rare that a hip-hop artist balances lightness, seriousness, funk, and message as successfully as this one does -- especially the first time out."

== Personal life ==
Diatta was subjected to FGM when she was a child. She met Lucas May, an Austrian ethologist, in 2005; they married within a week. In March 2006, she and her husband moved to Berlin.
