= Fatou Niang Siga =

Senegalese author and schoolteacher (1932–2022)

- Born: 1932
- Died: 2022|April |11
- Citizenship: Senegalese
- Occupation: Schoolteacher
- Children: Twelve children

Fatou Niang Siga (1932 – 11 April 2022) was a Senegalese author and schoolteacher. She was a Mouride Muslim and has made the hajj to Mecca twice. She was married and had twelve children. Her daughter Maïmouna Sourang Ndir served as Senegal's ambassador to France. Her writing revolved around her native Saint-Louis, Senegal. Siga died on 11 April 2022.

== Selection of works ==
The following are a selection of her works:

- Saint-Louis du Sénégal et sa mythologie, Midi/Occident (2006)
- Costume saint-louisien sénégalais d'hier à aujourd'hui (2006)
- Kija: chungu cha mwana mwari wa Giningi, Issues 1-3, by Niang Fatou Niang Siga, Novati Rutenge, Shani Abdallah Kitogo, published by Taasisi ya Uchunguzi wa Kiswahili, Chuo Kikuu cha Dar es Salaam, 200?,ISBN 9789976911794
- Reflet de modes et traditions Saint-Louisiennes (Dakar, 1990)

== Bibliography ==
- Reflets de modes et traditions saint-louisiennes [Reflections of the fashions and traditions of Saint-Louis]. Dakar: Khoudia, 1990. (141p.). Essay.
