= Telecommunications in Senegal =

Telecommunications in Senegal include radio, television, fixed and mobile telephones, and the Internet.

In 2012 the country had roughly 338,200 landlines for its 13.0 million inhabitants. A number of cyber cafés are located in the capital, Dakar, and other cities.

== Regulation ==
Sonatel, Senegal's main telecommunications operator, was privatized in 1997 with France Télécom as the strategic partner. Sonatel continues to dominate the market. Liberalization of some services accompanied privatization. Two companies now provide cellular telephone services, and there is a competitive Internet services market.

An independent regulatory agency for the telecommunications sector, the Agency for Telecommunications and Postal Regulation (ARTP), was created in early 2002. Besides regulating providers of telecommunications services, the agency assigns and controls radio spectrum. The long-awaited telecommunications sector deregulation became effective in July 2004, with the release of a sectoral letter that outlined the IT policy for the coming years. Telecommunications entrepreneurs who had hoped for a sweeping deregulation received a regime of guided deregulation instead.

The Government wants Senegal to be a haven for teleprocessing services, with its advantageous geographic position, relatively good telecommunications infrastructure and relatively low wages. A number of joint venture call centers and the telemarketing businesses have sprung up, most of them servicing the French market.

In 2007, sales generated by the telecommunications sector accounted for more than 7 percent of GDP.

== Radio and television ==
- Radio stations:
  - Approximately 80 community, public, and private commercial radio stations (2012);
  - 8 AM, 20 FM, and one shortwave stations (2001).
- Radios: 1.2 million (1997).
- Television stations:
  - State-run Radiodiffusion Television Senegalaise (RTS) operates five main stations at Dakar, Thies, Tambacouda, Ziguinchor, and Louga; there are also numerous relay stations.
  - One (1997).
- Television sets: 361,000 (1997).

Radio is the most important medium of mass information and source of news due to the high illiteracy rate. The BBC World Service (105.6 MHz) and Radio France Internationale are available on FM in Dakar.

Radiodiffusion Télévision Sénégalaise (RTS) and 2sTV are the two main TV channels.

The government maintains control of locally televised information and opinion through RTS. By law, the government holds a majority interest in RTS, and the president directly or indirectly controls selection of all members of the 12-person RTS executive staff. However, in addition to RTS, five privately owned television channels are operating.

Selective government media assistance appears to favor those government and independent outlets more friendly to the administration. The government frequently uses subsidies, and in a few cases threats and intimidation, to pressure the media not to publicize certain issues. The law criminalizes libel, and libel laws are used to block or punish critical reporting and commentary. Occasional incidents of self-censorship by journalists occurred, particularly in government-controlled media.

Senegal is a popular destination for amateur radio operators from Western and European points of origin who participate in "DXpeditions". A DXpedition is essentially a holiday planned for the purpose of making contacts with other amateur radio enthusiasts around the world. These short duration trips also help to promote interest in radio sports among the local residents who might otherwise not have the opportunity to experience radio communications for recreational and experimental purposes. More information may be obtained through the American Radio Relay League at www.arrl.org (K4YZ).

== Telephones ==
There are currently four cellular companies: the former Alizé, now Orange owned by Sonatel; Tigo/Sentel(now under the French Free Mobile brand), 75 percent owned by Millicom International Cellular; Hayo/CSU; and Expresso/Sudatel. Orange has roughly two thirds of the cellular market, but Tigo is rapidly gaining market share. In November 2007 a third mobile license was awarded to Sudan's Sudatel for $200 million. The license permits Sudatel to offer fixed line telephone and Internet service (for which Sonatel had a monopoly). In 2012 a fourth license was awarded to CSU/Hayo, permitting them to offer mobile, fixed, wifi, and wimax services.

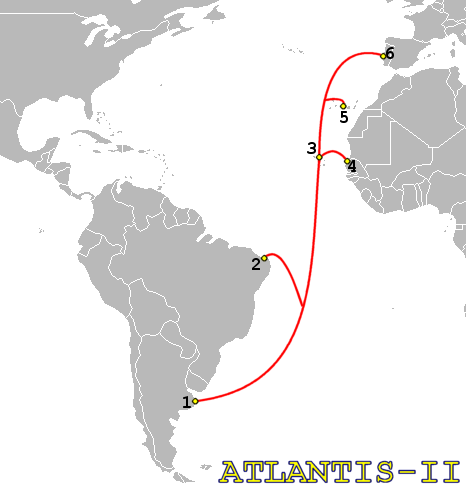
The Atlantis-2 cable system. #4 is Dakar, Senegal.

- Calling code: +221, international calls to most countries can be dialed directly.
- International call prefix: 00
- Main lines:
  - 338,200 lines in use, 110th in the world (2012);
  - 224,600 lines in use (2002).
- Mobile cellular:
  - 11.5 million lines, 73rd in the world (2012);
  - 3.2 million lines (2007).
- Communications cables: South Atlantic 3/West Africa Submarine Cable/ SAFE (SAT-3/WASC/SAFE) fiber-optic cable provides connectivity to Europe and Asia, while the Atlantis-2 fiber-optic cable provides connectivity to South America.
- Satellite earth stations: One Intelsat (Atlantic Ocean).

== Internet ==
Internet service is widely available in Dakar and other towns either by private subscription or through Senegal's extensive network of "telecentres" and Internet cafés. The Asymmetric Digital Subscriber Line (ADSL) broadband subscriber base is growing rapidly, though the penetration rate is less than 1 percent.

- Top-level domain: .sn
- Internet users:
  - 68.5%, or approximately 10.4 million users in 2018
  - 2.5 million users, 84th in the world; 19.2% of the population, 145th in the world (2012).
  - 1.8 million users, 76th in the world (2009).
- Fixed broadband: 94,548 subscriptions, 103rd in the world; 0.7% of the population, 145th in the world (2012).
- Wireless broadband: 486,490 subscribers, 92nd in the world; 3.8% of the population, 117th in the world (2012).
- Internet hosts: 237 hosts, 197th in the world (2012).
- IPv4: 293,248 addresses allocated, less than 0.05% of the world total, 22.6 addresses per 1000 people.
- Internet service providers: 762 ISPs (2014).

=== Internet censorship and surveillance ===
There are no government restrictions on access to the Internet, or reports that the government monitors e-mail or Internet chat rooms without appropriate legal authority. Individuals and groups engage in the peaceful expression of views via the Internet, including by e‑mail. However, in 2023 and 2024, the government shut down all mobile internet access by all providers several times to prohibit communication during periods of unrest due to trials and imprisonment of Ousmane Sonko (2023) and the suspension and delay of the February 2024 national election (2024).

The constitution and law provide for freedom of speech and press; however, the government limits these rights in practice. Individuals can generally criticize the government publicly or privately without reprisal. The law criminalizes libel, and libel laws are used to block or punish critical reporting and commentary. The constitution and law prohibit arbitrary interference with privacy, family, home, or correspondence, and the government generally respects these prohibitions in practice.

=== Scholarly communication ===
==== Open access ====
Open access to scholarly communication in Senegal is developing. The Consortium des Bibliothèques de l'Enseignement Supérieur du Sénégal (academic library consortium) and the Association Sénégalaise des Bibliothécaires, Archivistes et Documentalistes (professional society) have signed the Budapest Open Access Initiative.

The French Ministry of Foreign Affairs funded in 2004–2007 the creation of scholarly publishing platforms in Africa ("Système d’information scientifique et technique"), which led to the 2006 launch of SIST Sénégal. According to UNESCO, the Bibliothèque SIST Sénégal is one of two open access repositories in Senegal, the other being Biens Culturels Africains at the Institut Fondamental d'Afrique Noire.

== See also ==
- Media of Senegal
- Radiodiffusion Télévision Sénégalaise, the Senegalese public broadcasting company.
- Terrestrial fibre optic cable projects in Senegal
