= Inga Berre =

Norwegian applied mathematician

- Born: 31 July 1978 (age 48); Norway
- Citizenship: Norwegian
- Occupation: mathematician

Inga Berre (born 31 July 1978) is a Norwegian applied mathematician who studies numerical methods for the partial differential equations used to model fractured geothermal systems and porous media more generally. She is a professor in the department of mathematics at the University of Bergen, a scientific advisor to the Chr. Michelsen Institute in Bergen, and a leading researcher on geothermal energy in Norway.

== Education and career ==
Berre earned a candidate degree in mathematics from the University of Bergen in 2001, and completed a doctorate (Dr. Sci.) in 2005. Her dissertation, Fast simulation of transport and adaptive permeability estimation in porous media, was jointly supervised by Helge Dahle, Knut-Andreas Lie, Trond Mannseth, and Kenneth Hvistendahl Karlsen.

She joined the University of Bergen faculty as an associate professor in 2006, and was promoted to full professor in 2013. In 2018 she became chair of the Joint Programme Geothermal of the European Energy Research Alliance.

== Recognition ==
Berre is a member of the Norwegian Academy of Technological Sciences, elected in 2017. In 2021 she was elected Council Members-at-Large for SIAM for a term running 1 January 2022 - December 31, 2024.
