= E. Jefferson Murphy =

American historian (1926–2013)

Emmett Jefferson Murphy, who wrote as E. Jefferson Murphy, (July 2, 1926 – June 19, 2013) was a historian of Africa. He had a distinguished career with the African-American Institute, and wrote a series of favorably reviewed books on African history between 1969 and 1981. His History of African Civilization is a classic textbook on African history.

== Career ==
Born in Thomasville, Georgia, on July 2, 1926, Murphy began his career as an African specialist while serving as visiting lecturer in social anthropology at South Africa's University College of Fort Hare (then the only college for non-whites in apartheid South Africa). He served the African American Institute in Washington (U.S.), New York City, Accra (Ghana, and Dar-es-Salaam (Tanzania) between 1954 and 1970. From 1965 to 1970 he was the institute's Executive Vice President in New York, retiring in that year to return to the academic field.

From 1971 to 1973 he completed his doctoral studies, then became full-time consultant to Carnegie Corporation of New York. In 1975 he was named Coordinator and chief executive officer of Five College, Inc., the consortium linking Amherst, Hampshire, Mount Holyoke, and Smith colleges and the University of Massachusetts Amherst. Murphy retired as coordinator in 1988, to serve as Five College Professor of African Studies, based at Smith College, until his retirement in 1991.

== Wider interests ==
In retirement Murphy devoted himself to political activism, serving as vice president and Steering Committee member of the Florida Coalition for Peace & Justice; Steering Committee member of the Southwest Florida Peace Coalition, and as chief writer and consultant for the internet emailing service of Progressive Secretary.

A member of the Sarasota Monthly Meeting of the Society of Friends (Quakers), he was also an avid sailor and amateur home builder. He married Winifred WindRiver and had three children by a former marriage, including Emmett J. Murphy III, known as Murph, who plays drums in the rock band Dinosaur Jr.

== Publications ==
History of African Civilization was published by Thomas Y. Crowell Company in 1972, and later that same year in paperback by Dell Books. Hollis Lynch, professor emeritus of African History at Columbia University, wrote the introduction to the paperback edition. In 1981, it was translated into Romanian and published as a two-volume paperback by Biblioteca Pentru Toti.

Murphy also wrote Understanding Africa (1969 & 1980), The Bantu Civilization of Southern Africa (1974), and Creative Philanthropy: Carnegie Corporation and Africa 1953–1973 (1975). He also co-authored, with Harry Stein, Teaching Africa Today, (1973) a handbook for American social studies teachers.

As of 2006, all of Murphy's books are out of print.

== Works ==
- Understanding Africa, Thomas Y. Crowell Co., NY, 1968, with illustrations by Louise Jefferson
- Schooling for Servitude, Some Aspects of South Africa's Bantu Education System (1972)
- History of African Civilization, Thomas Y Crowell Co., NY, 1972
  - Istoria Civilizatiei Africane, Biblioteca Pentru Tota, Bucharest, 1981
- The African Mythology: Old and New, 1973
- Teaching Africa Today (with Harry Stein), Scholastic Press, NY, 1973
- The Bantu Civilization of Southern Africa, Thomas Y. Crowell Co., NY, 1974
- Creative Philanthropy: Carnegie Corporation and Africa, 1953–73, Teachers College Press, NY (1975)
