= Fatoumata Nafo-Traoré =

Malian doctor and public health official (born 1958)

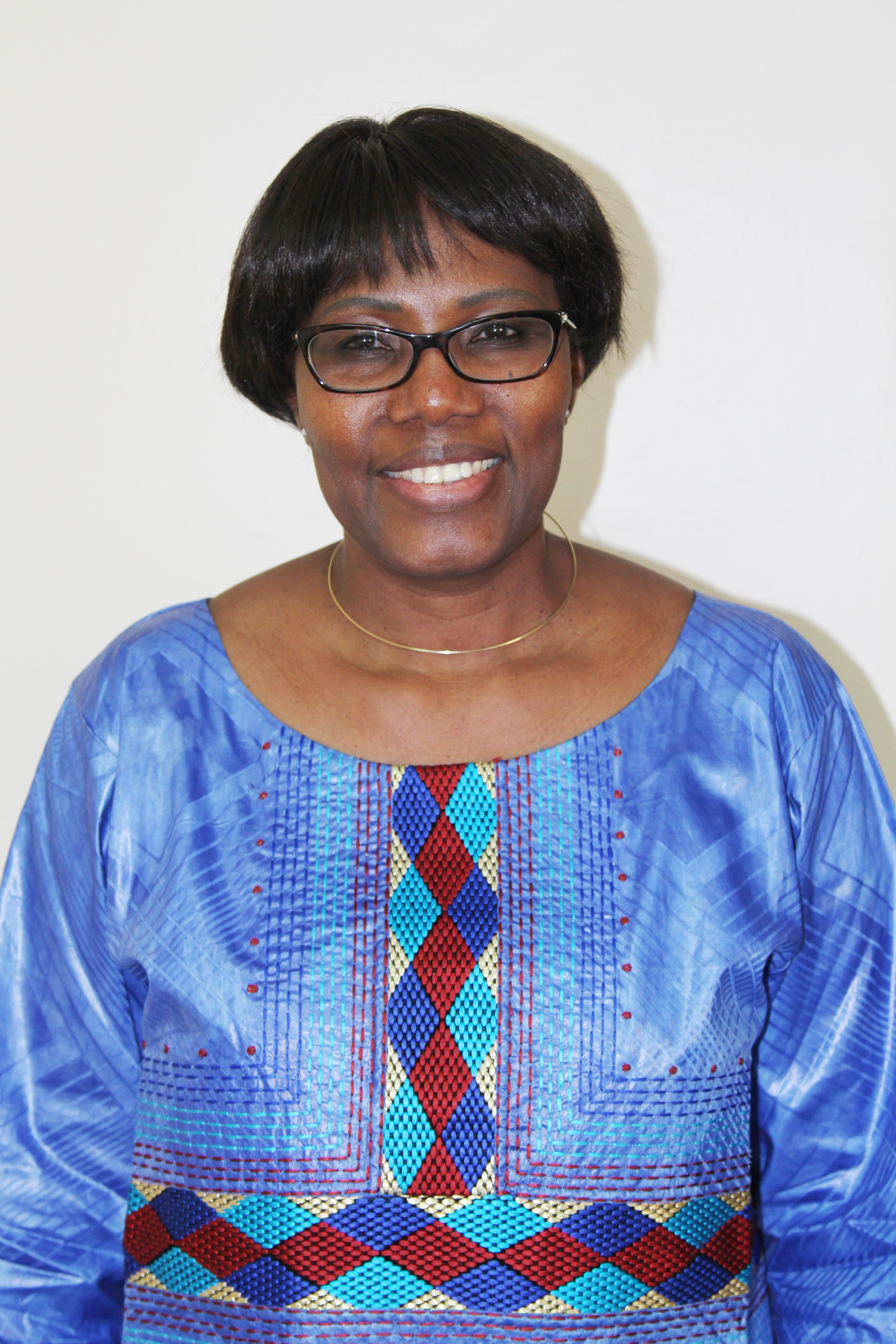
- Nafo-Traoré in 2017
- Born: 1958 (age 67–68)
- Occupations: Doctor, public health official

Dr. Fatoumata Nafo-Traoré is a Malian medical doctor and public health official. She is the Regional Director, Africa at the International Federation of Red Cross and Red Crescent Society (IFRC). Prior to this role, she served as the Executive Director of Roll Back Malaria Partnership.

== Career ==
She worked as a Health Specialist at the World Bank in Bamako and served as Minister of Health and later on Minister of Social Affairs, Solidarity and the Elderly of Mali from 2000 to 2002. She served as Chair of the Assembly of Ministers of ECOWAS and was Member of the Board of the Global Alliance for Vaccine and Immunization (GAVI). Nafo-Traoré was Executive Secretary of the Roll Back Malaria Partnership Secretariat from 2003 to 2004 and the Director of the WHO Roll Back Malaria Department from 2004 to 2005 and then as WHO representative to the Congo and Ethiopia.

She is a member of professional associations and has authored technical publications and studies. Nafo-Traoré is currently a Board Member of the Global Fund to Fight AIDS, Tuberculosis and Malaria, Innovative Vector Control Consortium and Medicines for Malaria Venture.

== Awards ==
Nafo-Traoré was twice awarded the national distinction of “Chevalier” and “Officer” de l'Ordre National du Mali, in 1996 and in 2007.
