= Fatou Camara (journalist) =

Fatoumata "Fatu" Camara
- Education: Gambia High School
- Occupations: Television presenter and journalist

Fatoumata "Fatu" Camara (also Fatou Camara) is a television presenter and journalist from the West African state of The Gambia.

== Early life and education ==
Camara was born in Banjul, the daughter of Modou Lamin Camara and Fatou Njie. She attended the Albion Primary School and then the Gambia High School.

== Career ==
After finishing high school, she worked for Radio 1 FM and part-time from 1996 for the National Youth Service Scheme (NYSS), simultaneously with her job at Citizen FM . She left The Gambia in 1996 and studied media and communication in Birmingham.

After returning to the Gambia, she worked as a reporter and news anchor for the Gambia Radio & Television Service (GRTS) until 2000 and again from 2002 to 2005. From 2000 to 2002 she was with her husband (later ex-husband) in the United States, she then worked from 2005 at the US Embassy in Banjul as an assistant protocol/military liaison officer, in which she worked out military training programs for members of the Gambian military in collaboration with the US Department of Defense. Camara ended her work at the US Embassy in 2008 to start her own public relations company. At the same time, she started Gambia's first TV talk show, The Fatu Show, which quickly became the most watched show in the country.

In 2011 and again in 2013 she served President Yahya Jammeh as a press officer (Director of Press & Communication, Office of the President). In 2011 she was released from work after three months. In 2013, she was arrested as a press officer and ultimately detained for 25 days without contact with the outside world in September. During her detention, she was asked to hand over passwords to her email and Facebook to officers of the National Intelligence Agency (NIA). According to the new internet laws, she could faced up to 15 years in prison for 'tarnishing the image' of the president. The allegations are linked to false information about Jammeh that was allegedly published in Freedom Newspaper, a website about the Gambia from the United States. After paying a bail, she lost her job, and there was executive instruction from the president to prohibit her further appearances on television. Camara fled abroad via Senegal. Since then she has been living in exile in Georgia in the United States.

In the diaspora, she runs a news website for The Gambia and is strongly networked via social media such as Facebook, Twitter, YouTube, Instagram and SoundCloud. Their Facebook page "The Fatu Network" is watched by more than 250,000 users (as of March 2017). In August 2014, she was assaulted by supporters of Jammeh in the United States.

Camara brought an action against the Gambian state before the Community Court of Justice of the West African Economic Community (ECOWAS) and received a million Dalasi reparations in February 2018. In May 2019 the Gambian government paid her US$25,000.
