= Fatu =

Fatu may refer to:

== Professional wrestlers ==
- First generation:
  - Solofa Fatu Jr. (born 1965), known as Rikishi and Fatu
  - Sam Fatu (born 1965), twin brother of Solofa
  - Edward Smith Fatu (1973–2009), known as Umaga; younger brother of the twins
- Second generation:
  - Jacob Fatu (born 1992), son of Sam
  - Joshua Samuel and Jonathan Solofa Fatu (born 1985), known as The Usos; older sons of Solofa
  - Trinity Fatu (born 1987), known as Naomi; wife of Jonathan and daughter-in-law of Solofa
  - Joseph Fatu (born 1993), known as Solo Sikoa; younger son of Solofa

== Others ==
- Fatu Gayflor (born 1966), Liberian singer
- Fatu Feu'u (born 1946), Samoan artist
- Fatu Kekula, Liberian nurse and inventor
- Anastasie Fătu (1816–1886), Romanian scientist
- Florea Fătu (1924–1995), Romanian footballer
- Ilie Fătu (born 1974), Romanian weightlifter
- Tufuga Fatu (1914–1981), Western Samoan chief
- Mr. Fatu (Fatu Lauoletolo), Samoan singer
- Fatu, a northern white rhinoceros

== See also ==
- Fatou (disambiguation)
- Anoaʻi family, of which many of the professional wrestlers listed above are a part
