= Le Populaire (Senegalese newspaper) =

Le Populaire is a major independent daily newspaper in Senegal.
