= Le Matin (Senegal) =

Senegalese newspaper

Le Matin (French pronunciation: [lə matɛ̃], The Morning) was a major independent daily newspaper in Senegal, with a combined Saturday/Sunday issue. Publication of Le Matin ceased with its final edition on July 31, 2011.
