= Gender equality in Senegal =

Senegal's typically patriarchal society dictates that women traditionally take care of the household duties such as cooking, cleaning, gathering water and firewood, and caring for children. and that men are in charge of the house. In Senegal, women have the same legal rights as men. However, it is still the case today that women are disadvantaged in many respects. These socio-economic conditions, and legal frameworks that often fail to fully protect or empower women and girls.

== Women in the family ==
Despite governmental laws, outdated and incorrect perceptions of Sharia Law still enjoy a higher profile in many parts of Senegal. For example, they believe this law prohibits women from owning property or inheriting land from their fathers and husbands, although Islamic inheritance jurisprudence is widely disputed and has many laws that encourage women's inheritance. Many Senegalese women also have the problem of being denied access to the labor market. There are different views on why the woman is more likely to stay at home and not to provide for a second income in the household. On the one hand, many Senegalese men do not want their wives to go out to work and make money, as this could potentially erode the power dynamic between husband and wife. The men are in their eyes still the ones who have to raise the money and financially to take care of the family. They want to prevent the women from being able to make any claims. Among other things, it is important to many men that the woman stays at home with the children to teach them the Muslim values.

== Girls' and boys' education ==
In Senegal, gender roles are clearly defined at home, and the opportunity cost of schooling tends to be higher for girls than for boys, and more so in rural areas. In Senegal, especially in rural areas, girls are having more challenges in getting access to education than boys are. In addition to traditional norms that are being kept, it is the lack of education and illiteracy that prevents women from advancing. Many families rather send boys to school. Many girls that still go to school tend to drop out early, often due to drivers like marriage or early pregnancy. Nevertheless, over the past decade in Senegal, the enrollment of girls for secondary school has increased. The gender parity index (GPI) of primary enrollment worldwide has improved from below 0.9 in 1990 to 0.97 in 2012. Gender parity often indicates that in many countries in the world girls are under-enrolled, while the recent improvement of the GPI also implies a rising dropout rate for boys in some countries In Senegal, 81 boys for every 100 girls dropped out in 1999, whereas 113 boys for every 100 girls dropped out in 2011.

== Child marriage ==
Between 2000 and 2009, nearly 40% of Senegalese girls surveyed said they were married before their 18th birthday. This practice has been proven to have serious emotional and psychosocial consequences for those affected. They enter sexual relationships, which are often not consensual, and have to go directly from child to adulthood without adolescence. These weddings are also harmful because the girls very often have no say in choosing their future husband. A Driver of this is education. Child marriage is one of the main causes of girls dropping out of school which therefore reduces overall economic productivity and increases gender inequality. Women with secondary education or higher are less likely to getting married before the age of 18 than women with no education and with simply primary education.

== Senegalese Law on Parity ==
Women represent 52% of the total Senegalese population, but only 23% of the representatives in the National Assembly, approximately 10% of the government officials, and about 13% of regional council members. Many female politicians from across the political spectrum felt marginalised within their own political parties and saw the need for a common arena where women's attendance and work in politics could be discussed. Therefore, In 2010, the Senegalese women's movement, being considered one of the strongest in Africa, was able to push for the adoption of the Law of parity. This law was later signed by former President Abdoulaye Wade. The aim of the law is to achieve equal female-male ratio in political parties candidate lists. Parties that do not comply with the law can be void. Already in 2012 the national election saw an increase of female parliamentarians from 22,7% to over 42% in the National Assembly. In the 2014 local election an increase from 16% to 47% was able to be seen in local legislatures. However, the law could not be implemented in all respects. The second largest city in Senegal, Touba, presented an all-male candidate list of 100 candidates for the first elections since the law was introduced in 2014. As a result, the electoral commission was forced to exclude the party for failing to comply with the law of parity. Since the city of Touba, however, is a Muslim city and there, in contrast to other Senegalese cities, not the political parties but the Muslim Khalif created the candidate list, this injury referred to the laws of Sharia. Parity, he says, will never be in this city. The conflict between the sociological reality and the development project remains a major topic in Senegal.
