= Sud Quotidien =

Senegalese news media

Sud Quotidien is a major independent daily newspaper in Senegal.
