= Nouvel Horizon =

Senegalese newspaper

Nouvel Horizon is an economic weekly newspaper in Senegal.
