= Il Est Midi =

Il Est Midi is a major independent daily newspaper in Senegal. Its offices are based in the Senegalese capital, Dakar.

Il Est Midi is published in French and the title, 'Il est midi', is French for 'it is midday'.
