= Fatou Jaw-Manneh =

Gambian journalist and activist

- Born: Gambia
- Occupation: Journalist

Fatou Jaw-Manneh is a Gambian journalist and activist who received political asylum from the United States in 1994 and has lived in the U.S. ever since. She is a well-known member of the Gambian community in the U.S. and runs the popular news and politics website Maafanta.com. She was the first female reporter at the Gambian Daily Observer and is widely known as “Gambia's Iron Lady” and the “Dame of the Flaming Pen.”

During a visit to her native country in 2007, Jaw-Manneh was arrested and tried for sedition. Her arrest and trial were widely covered by international human rights groups and were protested by the Committee to Protect Journalists and by PEN in the UK and the U.S.

== Early life and education ==
Fatou Jaw-Manneh was born in Sukuta/Foni Bulock, Gambia. She has recalled that as a young woman she “sat contemplating, with [her] brother and his friends"...how they were "going to get a job” in a country “rife with nepotism, corruption, and serious government irresponsibility.” Her brother, she said, taught her “how to brew tea/attaya, play Scrabble, listen to all kinds of music; mostly Bob Marley, Burning Spear, Peter Tosh and all the heavyweight reggae kings….Plus he introduced me to reading political materials and holding arguments, taking and receiving blows.”

She has said that her first job after high school was “a receptionist/phone operator at the Novotel/Kombo beach Hotel.” When she was laid off during after tourist season, a friend of her father's “gave [her] a job at his tiny juice shop,” where she “sold soft drinks and rented out action movies.” At the time she was “a young married mother with two sons,” whose husband was “on a hustle in America,” seeking help to “get into law school.”

== Introduction to journalism ==
During this time, she was drawn to the current events of her native country and the globe. “I would always buy the Observer, this new paper...” she explained. She would read about the Mandelas, and about “Lady Diana and Whitney Houston.” She liked the Observer because it ran “photos of our politicians,” thus providing “evidence of all our fears of and distaste for Gambian politicians,” and also “carried human-interest stories” and “represented the downtrodden.” Jaw-Manneh “began bombarding the Observer with letters to the editor about government waste, nepotism, cheating [the people] on government scholarships, and the dangers of skin bleaching. And about corruption and everything else that was bothering our communities.”

== Career at The Observer ==
Eventually, she went to the newspaper's offices and met the letters editor, who was the sister of Kenneth Y. Best, the Liberian exile who was the newspaper's publisher. Brewer “laughed at the sheer bulk of letters to the editor [Jaw-Manneh] was sending by the day” and introduced her to Best, who asked if she wanted to be a reporter. She reportedly replied “Oh no Sir, I am not that educated... and I know nothing about reporting.” He then offered her first a position as a columnist, but after she considered the proposals decided on being a reporter. She became the newspaper's first female reporter. As she “became more of an opinionated commentator,” says Jaw-Manneh, Best would “pluck and peel my opinions out of news stories,” saying “I am not asking for your opinion. Give me the story, the Who, What and Why.”

== Exile ==
Jaw-Manneh was granted political asylum in the U.S. in 1994 after the coup that brought President Yahya Jammeh to power. After her emigration from Gambia, she was a frequent contributor to the now-defunct U.S.-based opposition website AllGambian.net. In 2003 she wrote an article, entitled “Jammeh under the Microscope,” for the Gambian newspaper The Independent, which is also now-defunct. The article, which focused on that country's poverty level and corruption, resulted in the arrest and detention of the paper's editor, Abdoulie Sey. The Gambian government shut down The Independent in 2006.

Writing on her website Maafanta.com, Jaw-Manneh has argued that “no other sector in Gambian civil society has suffered as much as the private press under President Yahya Jammeh.” Although he had originally “presented himself as a different kind of...leader, one who respects and believes in a free and vibrant press,” he had eventually turned the press into his “punching bag,” as a result of which “most journalists have been forced to go into exile or to abandon the profession due to family pressure, while a number of newspapers and radio stations have been indefinitely closed by the government.”

== Arrest and trial ==
In March 2007, Jaw-Manneh traveled from the U.S. to Gambia, where her father had recently died. She was arrested upon arrival at Banjul Airport on March 28, 2007, by agents of the National Intelligence Agency and charged with sedition, in part for an interview she had given to the Independent newspaper in 2004. The interview, which had first appeared in June 2004, had been posted in October 2005 on several websites, including AllGambian.net. In the interview, she had stated: “Jammeh is tearing our beloved country into shreds, he debunked our hopes and became a thorn into every issue that is related to progress in The Gambia; be it social, political and economical. Worst of all he is a bundle of terror.”

Asked if the arrest had come as a shock, Jaw-Manneh said she had been “caught off guard…but not shocked, given the hostility towards journalists in the country.” Joel Simon, executive director of the Committee to Protect Journalists (CPJ), complained that Manneh's “week-long detention without charge violated her basic due process rights under Gambian laws.” CPJ called on Gambian authorities to drop the charges against Manneh.

On 4 April, Jaw-Manneh appeared before a court in Kanifing and was charged on three counts: “Intention to commit sedition,” “publication of seditious words,” and “publication of false news intended to cause public fear and alarm to the Gambian public.” A fourth charge, “uttering seditious words,” was added on 20 June 2007. Each of the counts carried a prison term of two years, a fine, or both. She was released on 25,000 dalasis (US$950) bail, but ordered to surrender her travel documents. The trial was set for 11 April 2007. Jaw-Manneh's lawyer argued that the court lacked jurisdiction, because the alleged offenses had been committed when Jaw-Manneh was outside the country, but the court rejected this argument. English PEN protested her trial, calling the charges “a violation of her right to freedom of expression guaranteed by the Gambian Constitution and international human rights treaties.”

Jaw-Manneh's incarceration and trial were “a very difficult time for [her],” she stated. “It is not easy when all of a sudden, you are restricted to an unhealthy facility. The emotional and mental torture was tough. I had to sleep in a mosquito infested room. I was red like a tomato from all the mosquito bites. No sleep. Thank God I did not fall sick after six days of detention.” During the trial itself, she recalled, “[so] much has changed after this military takeover. You see judges just being pawns and dictated to. So they choose to side with the dictator, and send citizens to jail for all kinds of libel and seditious charges.”

Jaw-Manneh's trial for sedition lasted a year and a half. She was sentenced to a fine of D250,000 (about $11,000) or four years in jail with hard labor. PEN American Center sent a letter to President Jammeh on September 10, 2008, to protest Jaw-Manneh's sentence and call for an acquittal, which was ignored. She chose to pay the fine, which she was able to pay with the help of friends, family, and the Gambian Press Union.

== Return to U.S. ==
After her return to the U.S., Jaw-Manneh continued criticizing Jammeh, describing him as “more dangerous, more corrupt than ever” and as “one of the richest and most corrupt leaders in Africa, who is “selling everything in Gambia, from bananas to bread to meat,” and trafficking in drugs and arms. She has claimed that “Gambians are being detained, jailed and killed at random,” and has also charged that “Gambians have never seen such a leader and hope he is the last of his kind in the country.”

In her article “Plea to the Gambian Intellectual”, written in August 2012, she wrote: “Gambia has been highjacked by an individual who is not qualified to lead our country” and who “has brought death, destruction, fear” to the country, which is “yearning for some of us to rise up” and save it “from the clutches of tyranny.” She called on “a selected few,” whom she dubbed 'The Redemption Gambia Group', “to come up with a plan that will ultimately rescue our country for sliding into the abyss.” Her favorite story, she noted, was “of the American Founding Fathers. Can you imagine then the power of the British Empire? 50 Americans choose to sign the [D]eclaration of Independence document, and shoot it out to the king,” thereby signing off “their right to live then, to liberty and to everything they own. Signing that document then was a death sentence.” As a result, many “families were torn,” but today not only are American citizens “benefiting from the actions and thoughtfulness of those brave men who came to their rescue 200 years ago, but every citizen of the world aspire[s] to come here to the USA for education, or to know that you can work the restaurant kitchens [and] get paid 250 dollars a week, take care of your family and live freely.”

In September 2012, Jaw-Manneh took part in a protest by Gambian and Senegalese citizens outside the State Capitol in St. Paul, Minnesota, against Jammeh's execution of nine death-row inmates. “The man is too brutal,” said Jaw-Manneh. “We are not animals… Jammeh should not decide who should live, die, eat or travel. It is unfair.” In a videotaped interview, she said: “We have an animal as a president. He’s a cannibal, he’s a thief…he’s a very, very wicked human being….We have to show him we are not afraid of him. It has to stop, this human sacrifice, this killing Gambians every day. It has to stop.”

In November 2013, Jaw-Manneh wrote a 75th birthday tribute to Best, whom she thanked for having hired her and others who had “no family or government connections.”

When Gambia passed a restrictive new press law in 2013, Jaw-Manneh wrote on Facebook: “Senseless and Ruthless! We are not threatened and shall never back down!!!” She spoke at the Oslo Freedom Forum in May 2014.

== Honors and awards ==
She won Oxfam Novib/PEN International Free Expression Award in 2007. It is presented “to writers who continue to work for freedom of expression in the face of persecution.” She won the Hellman/Hammett award from Human Rights Watch in 2009. The award aims “to help writers who dare to express ideas that criticize official public policy or people in power.”
