= Université des Mutants =

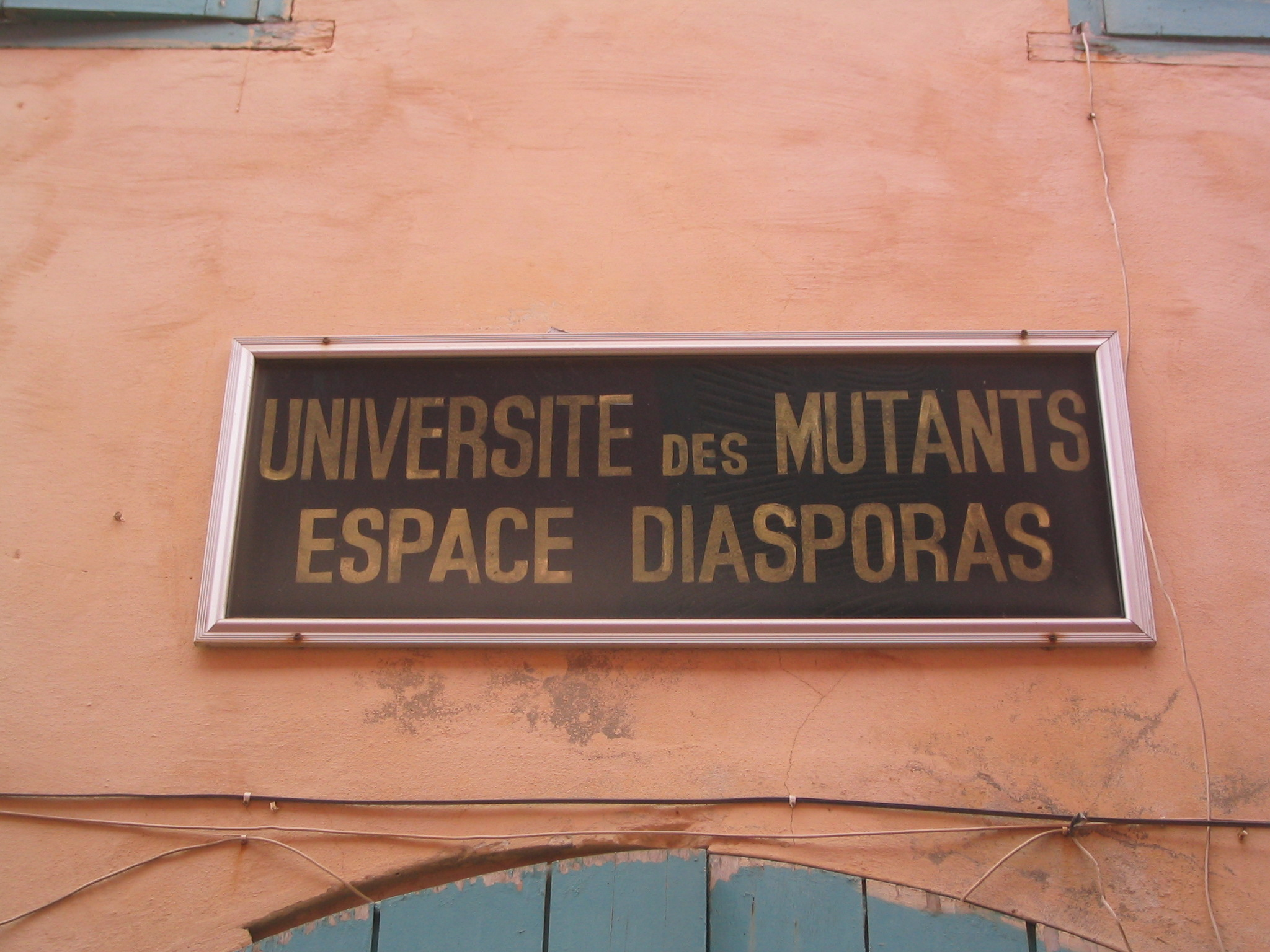

Université des Mutants (University of Mutants) is an international center of meetings and conferences on the island of Gorée, Senegal, opposite Fort d'Estrées which houses the Musée historique du Sénégal.

== History ==
The institution was founded at the initiative of Leopold Sedar Senghor and the French writer and philosopher Roger Garaudy.
It opened January 6, 1979 with support from UNESCO and the United Nations Programme for Development (UNDP) in addition to the initial capital of the State of Senegal and the Agence de Coopération Culturelle et Technique (ACCT). Its creation was formalized by law 81-3 February 2, 1981.
It was dissolved by Act 2005-08 of 22 July 2005.

== Administration ==
This is a public administrative institution. Under the supervision of the Ministry of Culture, it has a Board of Directors, a Director-General (currently Massaër Diallo) and an International Scientific Council.

== Objectives and activities ==
Its mission is "esquisser l'évolution que devrait suivre l'humanité en mutation pour assurer à tous les hommes le bien-être et la paix."

Filmography Symposia, seminars and study days are organized, and each year, tens of makers will come from many countries to share their experiences and contribute to this mission
