= Cecilia Fatou-Berre =

Catholic nun in Gabon (1901–1989)

- Born: Cecilia Fatou-Berre; 5 July 1901; French Congo
- Died: 2 November 1989 (aged 88)
- Education: School of sisters of the Immaculate Conception
- Occupations: Linguist, proselytiser, missionary, teacher and nunnery mother superior

Cecilia Fatou-Berre (5 July 1901 – 2 November 1989) was a religious sister in the French Congo and later Gabon. Able to speak several languages she taught children and novice sisters throughout Gabon. She rose to become a mother superior and head of the Congregation of the Sisters of St Marie of Gabon.

== Life ==
Cecilia Fatou-Berre was born 5 July 1901 in Libreville, French Congo - one of 15 children. Her father was a Mpongwe trader and her mother was from southern Cameroon. Fatou-Berre was educated at a catholic school run by the Sisters of the Immaculate Conception from 1909 to 1918. She expressed an interest in becoming a nun as early as 1910 and received a scholarship to a boarding school. However, whilst her mother accepted her chosen occupation her father opposed it as he had hoped she would marry and support him. Fatou-Berre left her family, escaping by boat with a French priest to the mission station at Donguila on 4 February 1918. She learnt to speak the Fang language, the only language spoken in Donguila parish. Fatou-Berre took her vows as a religious sister on 28 January 1923.

Fatou-Berre went to Franceville in the south-east of Gabon, a journey that took her two months of overland travel. Here she farmed to provide food for the mission and taught the Ndumu, Obamba and Teke languages and catechism to girls. Fatou-Berre was responsible for ensuring the mission had enough food through the famines of the 1920s and 30s. In 1929 she was made mother superior and made many conversions to Catholicism during the Great Depression. Fatou-Berre returned to her home town for the first time in 1941 before she became director of the novitiate of St Marie of Gabon at the mission station in Sindara. She wrote sermons in local languages and her students were sent to missions throughout the country, including Fernan Vaz Lagoon where Fatou-Berre was key in replacing South American and European sisters with Gabonese. Fatou-Berre remained at Sindara until 1950, when she went to Zanaga in modern-day Republic of the Congo and then to Minvoul, Gabon. At one point she was the first Gabonese sister to work in the Parish of St Andrew in Libreville, a fact remembered by a catholic community that was named after her. Fatou-Berre was made head of the Congregation of the Sisters of St Marie of Gabon in 1955 and held that position until 1967. She died, after a slow decline in her health, on 2 November 1989.
