= Fatou Kiné Camara =

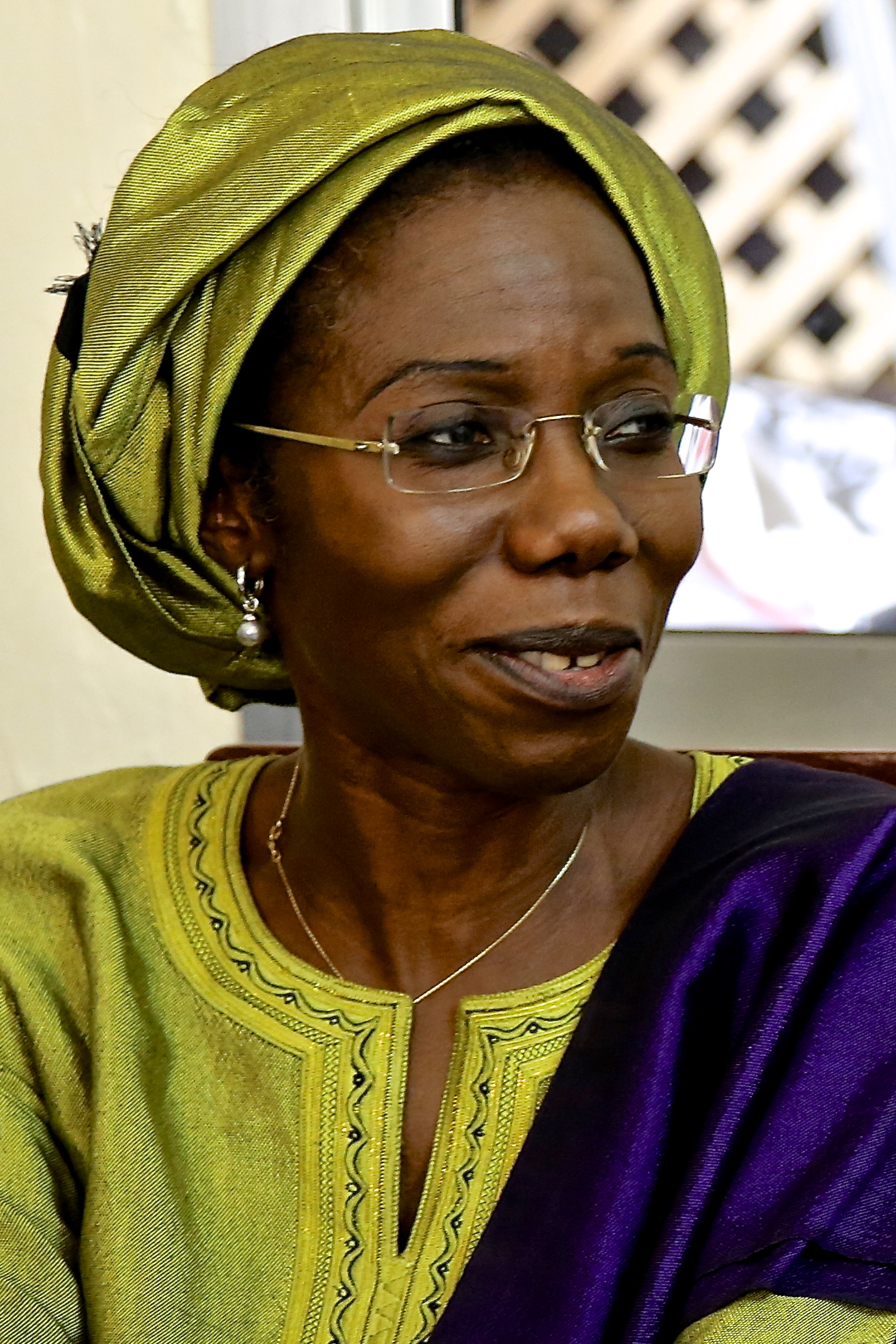
- Camara in 2014
- Born: 29 December 1964 (age 61); Dakar, Senegal
- Education: Doctor of Law, Cheikh Anta Diop University, 1988
- Occupations: Lecturer, researcher
- Known for: Women's rights campaigner

Fatou Kiné Camara (born 29 December 1964) is a Senegalese lawyer and women's rights campaigner. The daughter of a magistrate and government minister, Camara has a doctorate in law and works as a lecturer and researcher. She has supported campaigns for reform in many areas of the law and is particularly involved in attempting to increase the availability of abortions and free legal advice.

== Life ==
Camara was born on 29 December 1964 in Dakar. Her father, Ousmane Camara, was a magistrate for the French colonial authorities. He was a minister in the government of Senegal's first president, Léopold Sédar Senghor. After Senghor's resignation in December 1980, her father became Senegal's ambassador to the United Kingdom and Camara joined him, completing her secondary education in London. She studied law at the Panthéon-Assas University (Sorbonne Law School) in Paris and attained a doctorate in the same subject from the Cheikh Anta Diop University in Dakar in 1988. Camara is president of the Senegalese Women Lawyers' Association.

Camara became a lecturer and researcher, whilst also campaigning for improved rights for women and children in Senegal. She has participated in campaigns for reforms to the constitution, family law, electoral law, and laws on violence against women. Camara is a supporter of abortion rights and the decriminalisation of homosexuality.

Senegal's abortion laws are amongst the most restrictive in Africa, with jail time of up to 10 years for women who undergo the procedure. For an abortion to be legal, three doctors must certify that the woman will die otherwise. As each certification costs 10,000 francs, the poor are disadvantaged. Camara lobbies to change the law to accord with the Maputo Protocol (African Charter on the Rights of Women), which Senegal signed in 2004. This would allow abortion in cases of rape, incest, or where the woman's health is at risk.

Camara also supports a programme training "parajuristes" (community members with basic legal training) to act as the first contact in disputes. They provide free legal advice to those who cannot afford lawyers.

== Awards ==
In 2010, she received a human rights prize for the 50 years jubilee of independence of African States.
