= Le Soleil (Senegal) =

Le Soleil is a state-run daily newspaper published in Dakar, Senegal and founded in 1970. It was founded as a state-run newspaper by Senegal president Léopold Sédar Senghor at a time when press freedoms were tightly circumscribed. Since Senegal's transition to a democracy in 2000, the state has remained the main shareholder.

== History ==
In 1933, French press publisher Charles de Breteuil founded the Paris-Dakar as a weekly newspaper. The Paris-Dakar would in 1936 become the first daily newspaper in subsaharan Africa. Following the independence of Senegal, the paper changed its name in 1961 and became the Dakar-Matin. On 20 May 1970, it finally became Le Soleil.

== See also ==
- Media of Senegal
