= WalFadjri =

Senegalese French language daily newspaper

- Type: Daily newspaper
- Language: French
- Headquarters: Senegal
- Website: www.walf-groupe.com (in French)

WalFadjri is an independent daily newspaper published in Senegal. It is a French newspaper. It was owned by Sidy Lamine Niasse.

== See also ==
- Lists of newspapers
- Media of Senegal
