= Le Quotidien (Senegal) =

Independent daily newspaper in Senegal

- Type: Daily newspaper
- Format: Broadsheet
- Owner(s): Avenir Communications SA
- Editor: Madiambal Diagne
- Founded: 24 February 2003
- Political alignment: opposition
- Headquarters: Sodida, Rue 14 prolongée B.P : 25835 Dakar, Senegal
- Website: lequotidien.sn

Le Quotidien (French pronunciation: [lə kɔtidjɛ̃]; lit. The Daily) is a major independent daily newspaper in Senegal, based in the capital of Dakar. It also publishes a glossy weekly, entitled Week end.

== Launch ==
Launched by owner/editor Madiambal Diagne—a former reporter for Dakar's Wal Fadjri—and his Avenir Communications SA company in February 2003, Le Quotidien is generally critical of the government, as well as political and religious figures.

== Controversy ==
In July 2004 Diange was arrested pending charge by the government for publishing articles alleging fraud in the customs service and government interference in the judiciary. The arrest came from an alleged breach of Article 80 of the Penal Code, which mandates up to 5 years in jail for anyone convicted of "acts that might compromise public security or cause serious political problems." He was released following international pressure and a press strike.

== Expansion ==
In 2006, Le Quotidien purchased its own press facilities, freeing it from use of government owned printing facilities.

In 2007 the company's attempt to launch a sister radio station in Dakar was halted by the government, but Premiere FM opened after appeal at the end of that year.
