= Environmental issues in Senegal =

Senegal's environmental issues are varied. According to the CIA world factbook pressing problems exist with: diminishing wildlife populations which are threatened by poaching, deforestation, overgrazing, soil erosion, desertification, and overfishing.

== Climate change ==
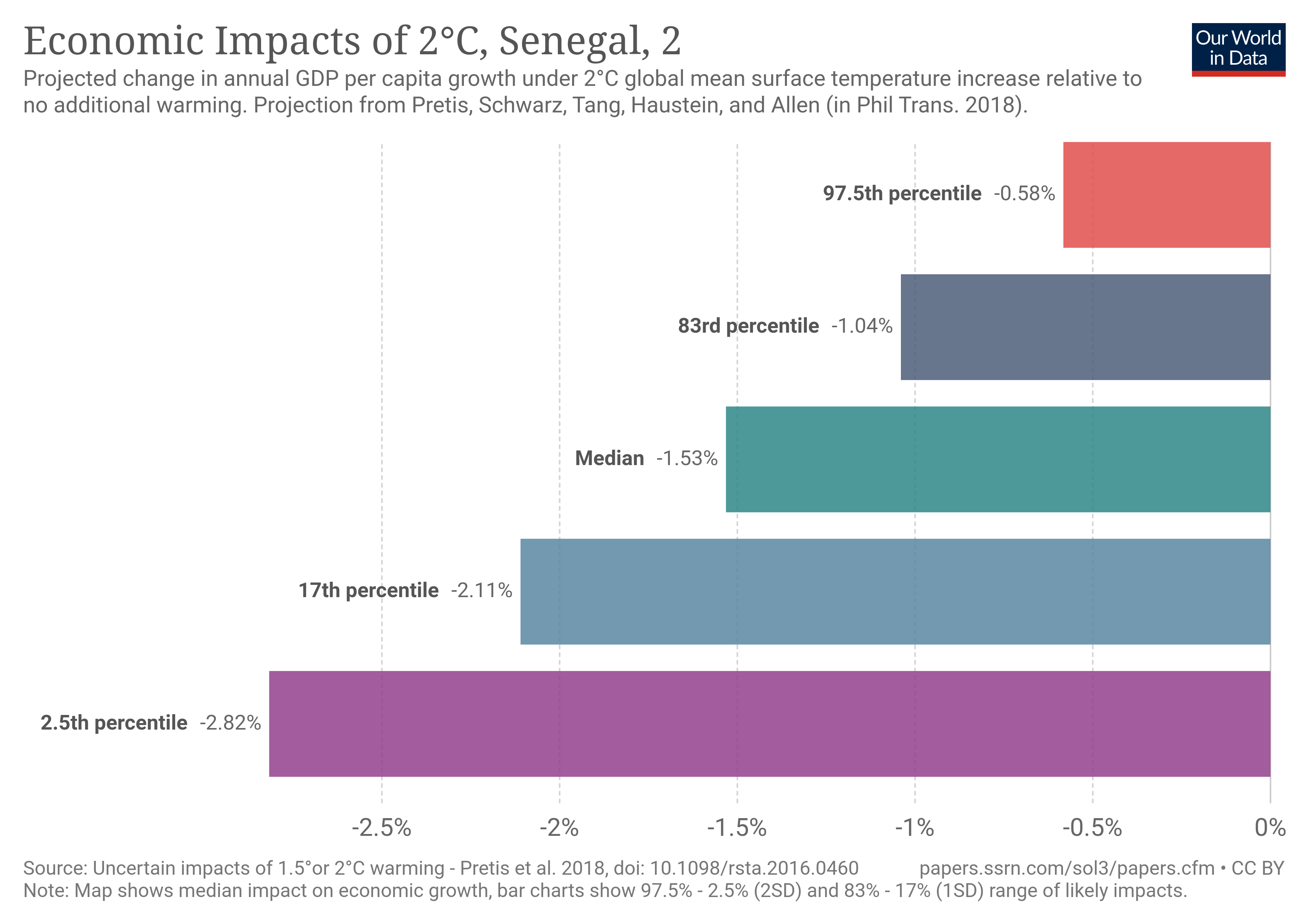
Economic impact of 2°C in Senegal

Climate change in Senegal will have wide reaching impacts on many aspects of life in Senegal. Climate change will cause an increase in average temperatures over west Africa by between 1.5 and 4 °C (3 °F and 7 °F) by mid-century, relative to 1986–2005. Projections of rainfall indicate an overall decrease in rainfall and an increase in intense mega-storm events over the Sahel. The sea level is expected to rise faster in West Africa than the global average. Although Senegal is currently not a major contributor to global greenhouse gas emissions, it is one of the countries most vulnerable to climate change.

Extreme drought is impacting agriculture, and causing food and job insecurity. More than 70% of the population is employed in the agricultural sector. Sea level rise and resulting coastal erosion is expected to cause damage to coastal infrastructure and displace a large percentage of the population living in coastal areas. Climate change also has the potential to increase land degradation that will likely increase desertification in eastern Senegal, leading to an expansion of the Sahara.

Climate change adaptation policies and plans are important to help Senegal prepare and adapt. In 2006, Senegal submitted its National Adaptation Programme of Action (NAPA) to the United Nations Framework Convention on Climate Change. The NAPA identifies water resources, agriculture, and coastal zones as the country's most vulnerable sectors. In 2015, Senegal released its Intended Nationally Determined Contributions (INDC's) that indicated climate change would be treated as a national priority.

== Deforestation and land degradation ==
Like other parts of West Africa and the developing world, social forces and policies are leading to deforestation and ecosystem degradation, leading to effects like Desertification and social erosion. Charcoal production, alongside pressure to expand agriculture in Senegal to meet the quadrupling of population has led to increased loss of forest.

In 2006, Senegal still had 45.1% —or about 8,673,000 hectares—of forest with 18.4% — or roughly 1,598,000 hectares — classified as primary forest. In 2007 Senegal was losing 350,000 hectares of forest per year through slash-and-burn for farming because of its rapidly growing population. Variability of rainfall compounded with issues like climate change, lead About 13% of the land - holding about 22% of the population - are now considered degraded. Senegal had a 2018 Forest Landscape Integrity Index mean score of 7.11/10, ranking it 56th globally out of 172 countries.

In 2016, the government warned that the Casamance forest cover would have vanished by 2018, if illegal logging continued.

=== Mitigation ===
Since 1970s Senegal has lost 25% of its mangrove forests. Recent efforts have been led by the organization Oceanium to replant the mangroves.

The national Forest Service designed in the early 2000s was designed to democratize and decentralize forest management. However, subsequent analysis by academics found that inequalities favor commercial interests and exploitation by economic forces.

=== Tree cover extent and loss ===
Global Forest Watch publishes annual estimates of tree cover loss and 2000 tree cover extent derived from time-series analysis of Landsat satellite imagery in the Global Forest Change dataset. In this framework, tree cover refers to vegetation taller than 5 m (including natural forests and tree plantations), and tree cover loss is defined as the complete removal of tree cover canopy for a given year, regardless of cause.

For Senegal, country statistics report cumulative tree cover loss of 5,243 ha (52.43 km^{2}) from 2001 to 2024 (about 13.3% of its 2000 tree cover area). For tree cover density greater than 30%, country statistics report a 2000 tree cover extent of 39,568 ha (395.68 km^{2}). The charts and table below display this data. In simple terms, the annual loss number is the area where tree cover disappeared in that year, and the extent number shows what remains of the 2000 tree cover baseline after subtracting cumulative loss. Forest regrowth is not included in the dataset.

Annual tree cover loss in Senegal, 2001–2024. View chart definition.
Tree cover extent in 2000 minus cumulative tree cover loss in Senegal, 2001–2024 (loss-only residual; does not account for gain). View chart definition.

Annual tree cover extent and loss
Year	Tree cover extent (km2) (Note: This residual measure does not include forest regrowth.)	Annual tree cover loss (km2)
2001	394.98	0.70
2002	393.34	1.64
2003	392.96	0.38
2004	391.68	1.28
2005	390.97	0.71
2006	390.56	0.41
2007	388.84	1.72
2008	385.99	2.85
2009	384.39	1.60
2010	382.85	1.54
2011	381.69	1.16
2012	380.85	0.84
2013	377.10	3.75
2014	373.83	3.27
2015	370.90	2.93
2016	368.35	2.55
2017	364.44	3.91
2018	361.43	3.01
2019	358.65	2.78
2020	351.06	7.59
2021	349.30	1.76
2022	346.41	2.89
2023	344.80	1.61
2024	343.25	1.55

=== REDD+ reference level and monitoring ===
Under the UNFCCC REDD+ framework, Senegal has submitted a national forest reference level (FRL). On the UNFCCC REDD+ Web Platform, the country's 2025 submission is listed as having an assessed reference level, while a national strategy, safeguards information and a national forest monitoring system are all listed as "not reported".

The first assessed FRL, submitted in 2025, covered three REDD+ activities at national scale: reducing emissions from deforestation, reducing emissions from forest degradation, and enhancement of forest carbon stocks. Using a 2011-2020 reference period, the assessed FRL was -8,860,748 t CO2 eq per year. The technical assessment states that it included above-ground biomass and below-ground biomass, reported CO2 only, and used a forest definition of at least 0.5 hectares, 10 percent canopy cover and trees at least 2 metres in height.

== Overfishing ==
West African communities face pressure from both overfishing by local fleets as well as Asian and European fleets harvesting from fisheries in West Africa as other fisheries become overfished or collapse. For example fleets in 2017 Saint-Louis, Senegal have seen a large decline in harvest, causing ripple effects on nutrition and food supply in the country, where 75% of animal protein comes from fish. White grouper fisheries in Senegal's waters have collapsed.

== See also ==
- Geography of Senegal
- Agriculture in Senegal
- Water supply and sanitation in Senegal
- Ecological Monitoring Centre, Senegal
- Rally of the Ecologists of Senegal
- List of mammals of Senegal
- List of non-marine molluscs of Senegal
- Basse Casamance National Park
