= Guédiawaye Stormwater Channel =

Drainage infrastructure in Dakar, Senegal

The Guédiawaye Stormwater Channel (French: Canal d'évacuation des eaux pluviales de Guédiawaye) is a drainage infrastructure located in Guédiawaye, a suburban department of the Dakar Region in Senegal. The channel is a key component of the Peri-Urban Stormwater Management Program (Programme de Gestion des Eaux Pluviales Périurbaines) implemented to address chronic flooding in Dakar's densely populated suburbs.

== Background ==
Guédiawaye is one of the most densely populated areas in Senegal, with an estimated population of over 400,000 residents in a relatively small area. The department experiences severe flooding during the annual rainy season (July to October), characterized by intense, short-duration rainfall events.

Rapid urbanization since the 1970s, combined with inadequate drainage infrastructure and low-lying topography, has made Guédiawaye one of the most flood-prone areas in the Dakar metropolitan region.

== The PROGEP project ==
The Guédiawaye stormwater channel was constructed as part of the Projet de Gestion des Eaux Pluviales et d'adaptation au changement climatique (PROGEP), a major flood management initiative funded by the World Bank, the French Development Agency (AFD), and the Senegalese government.

PROGEP, launched in 2012, aimed to reduce flood risk in peri-urban Dakar through:

- Construction of primary drainage channels and retention basins
- Rehabilitation of existing stormwater infrastructure
- Improvement of solid waste management to prevent channel blockages
- Community-based early warning systems

== Infrastructure design ==
The channel system in Guédiawaye consists of:

- Primary canals – Large-capacity concrete-lined channels that convey stormwater to the Atlantic Ocean via the Mbao and Malika natural outlets
- Secondary collectors – Smaller drains that collect runoff from individual neighborhoods
- Retention basins – Temporary water storage areas designed to reduce peak flows during heavy rainfall

The infrastructure is designed to handle rainfall events with return periods of up to 10 years, though extreme events continue to challenge system capacity.

== Challenges and flood events ==
Despite the PROGEP investments, Guédiawaye continues to experience flooding. Key challenges include:

- Sedimentation and sand accumulation in channels
- Solid waste disposal blocking drainage inlets
- Unauthorized construction on drainage easements
- Groundwater table rise in low-lying areas
- Increasing rainfall intensity potentially linked to climate change

In September 2020, heavy rains caused flooding affecting thousands of residents in Guédiawaye and neighboring Pikine, highlighting the ongoing vulnerability of the drainage system.

== See also ==
- Geography of Senegal
- Dakar
- Climate change in Senegal
