= Pseudorhabdosynochus hargisi =

Scientific classification
- Kingdom: Animalia
- Phylum: Platyhelminthes
- Class: Monogenea
- Order: Dactylogyridea
- Family: Diplectanidae
- Genus: Pseudorhabdosynochus
- Species: P. hargisi

Binomial name
- Pseudorhabdosynochus hargisi (Oliver & Paperna, 1984) Santos, Buchmann & Gibson, 2000

Species of worm

Pseudorhabdosynochus hargisi is species of a diplectanid monogenean parasitic on the gills of the White grouper Epinephelus aeneus. It was described in 1984 as Diplectanum hargisi and transferred to the genus Pseudorhabdosynochus by Santos, Buchmann & Gibson in 2000. Its systematic position has been clarified by Kritsky, Bakenhaster & Adams in 2015, who differentiated it from Pseudorhabdosynochus americanus.

== Description ==
Pseudorhabdosynochus hargisi is a small monogenean, 0.5-0.8 mm in length. The species has the general characteristics of other species of Pseudorhabdosynochus, with a flat body and a posterior haptor, which is the organ by which the monogenean attaches itself to the gill of is host. The haptor bears two squamodiscs, one ventral and one dorsal. The sclerotized male copulatory organ, or "quadriloculate organ", has the shape of a bean with four internal chambers, as in other species of Pseudorhabdosynochus. The vagina includes a sclerotized part, which is a complex structure.

== Etymology ==
The name of the species, hargisi, honours "Dr W. J. Hargis Jr, from the Virginia Institute of Marine Science in Gloucester Point (USA)".

== Hosts and localities ==
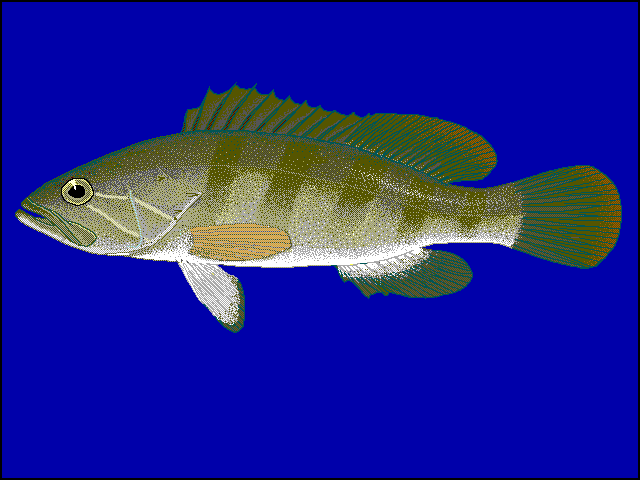
The white grouper Epinephelus aeneus, is the type-host of Pseudorhabdosynochus hargisi

The type-locality is the Lagoon of Bardawil (Sinaï, Egypt). The type-host is the halfmoon grouper, Epinephelus aeneus.
