= Geography of Senegal =

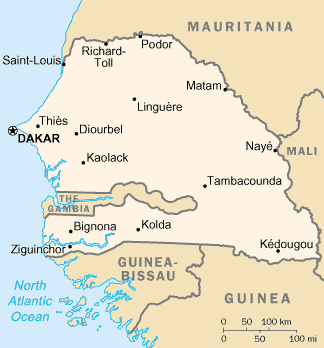

Location of Senegal

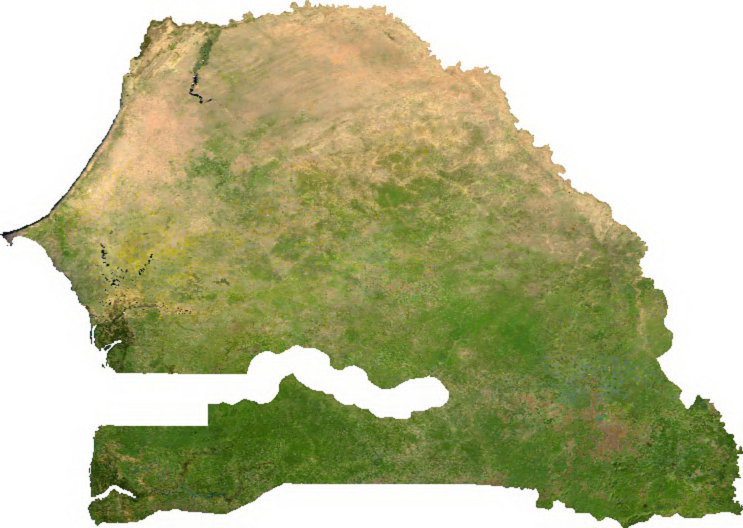
Satellite image of Senegal

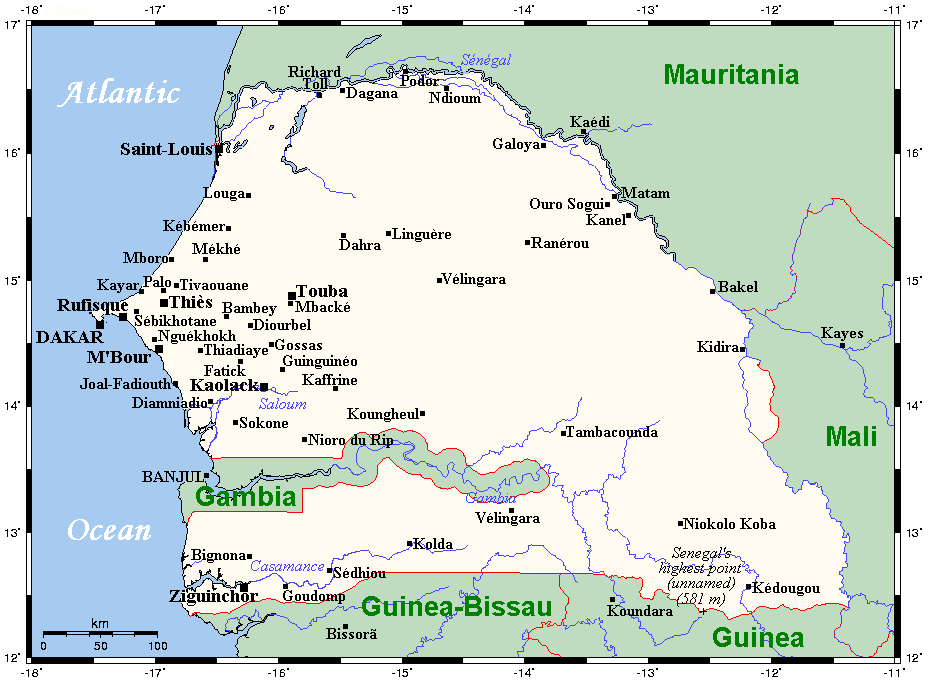
Senegal's cities and main towns

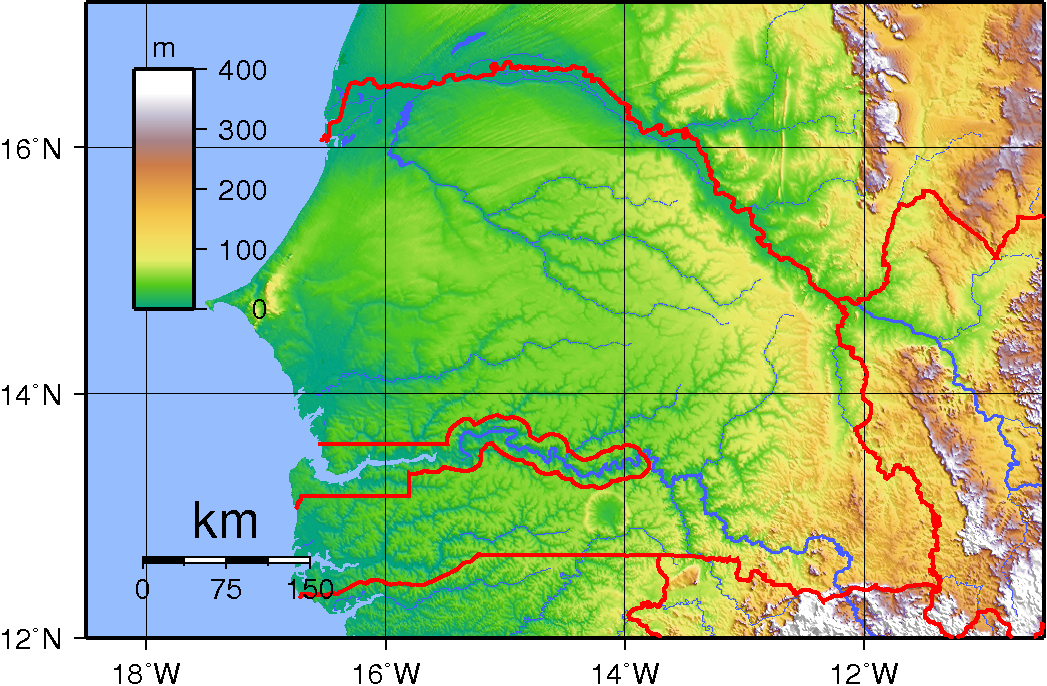
Topography of Senegal

Senegal is a coastal West African nation located 14 degrees north of the equator and 14 degrees west of the Prime Meridian. The country's total area is 196,190 km^{2} of which 192,000 km^{2} is land and 4,190 km^{2} is water.

70% of the population of Senegal lives in the Coastal Region, so climate change is expected to displace larger parts of the population.

== CIA World Factbook ==
Area
- Total: 196,712 km²
  - country rank in the world: 86th
- Land: 192,530 km²
- Water: 4,180 km²

Area comparative
- Australia comparative: approximately 6/7 the size of Victoria
- Canada comparative: approximately 2 3/4 times the size of New Brunswick
- United Kingdom comparative: approximately 4/5 the size of the United Kingdom
- United States comparative: slightly smaller than South Dakota
- EU comparative: approximately 1 1/2 times the size of Greece

Terrain: generally low, rolling, plains rising to foothills in the southeast.

Natural resources: fish, phosphates, iron ore

Land use:
arable land: 19.57%
permanent crops: 0.28%
other: 80.15% (2011)

Irrigated land: 1,197 km^{2} (2003)

Total renewable water resources: 38.8 km^{3}

Natural hazards: lowlands seasonally flooded; periodic droughts

Environment — current issues: wildlife populations threatened by poaching; deforestation; overgrazing; soil erosion; desertification; overfishing

Senegal is a party to several environmental treaties:

- Comprehensive Test Ban Treaty
- Convention on Biological Diversity
- Convention on Fishing and Conservation of Living Resources of the High Seas
- Convention on the International Trade in Endangered Species of Wild Flora and Fauna
- International Convention for the Regulation of Whaling
- Montreal Protocol
- United Nations Framework Convention on Climate Change
- United Nations Convention to Combat Desertification
- United Nations Convention on the Law of the Sea
- Ramsar Convention
- 1978 Convention on Ship Pollution

Senegal has signed, but not ratified, the Convention on Marine Dumping.

== Physical features ==
Senegal is bordered to the west by the North Atlantic Ocean. On land, the nation's longest border is with Mauritania to the north, an 813 km border along the Senegal River. To the east is the 419 km border with Mali. In the southeast is Guinea (330 km border) and to the south-southwest is Guinea-Bissau (338 km), both borders running along the Casamance River. Senegal is one of only a handful of countries to have a near-enclave within its borders—the small nation of the Gambia in the interior, which has a 740 km border with Senegal.

The Gambia penetrates more than 320 km into Senegal, from the Atlantic coast to the center of Senegal along the Gambia River, which bisects Senegal's territory. In total, Senegal has 2,640 km of land borders, and 531 km of coastline and shoreline. Senegal makes maritime claims of a 24 nmi (44.4 km; 27.6 mi) contiguous zone, a 12 nmi (22.2 km; 13.8 mi) territorial sea, and a 370 km (200 nmi; 230 mi) exclusive economic zone. It also claims a 200 nmi (370.4 km; 230.2 mi) continental shelf, or to the edge of the continental margin.

Another distinctive and well-known feature of the country is the pink-water Lake Retba, near the city of Dakar, which is one of the few lakes in the world with naturally pink or reddish coloured water.

The lowest point in Senegal is the Atlantic Ocean, at sea level. The highest point is Baunez ridge situated 2.7 km southeast of Nepen Diakha at 648 m (2,126 ft).

== Climate ==
Köppen–Geiger climate classification map at 1-km resolution for Senegal (1991–2020)

Senegal has three main climatic regions. The southern portion, south of The Gambia, has a tropical savanna climate (Köppen Aw) with two extremely contrasting seasons from northeast winter winds, including the dry dusty harmattan, and southwest summer winds. Annual rainfall in this region can reach 1,800 millimetres or 70 inches on the southern border, with as much as 600 millimetres or 24 inches in August at the height of the wet season, and virtually no rainfall from November to May. The central portion has a hot semi-arid climate (Köppen BSh) with similar seasons to the south, but with a less rainy and highly variable wet season. Dakar's annual rainfall of about 400 mm (16 in) occurs between June and October when maximum temperatures average 30 °C (86.0 °F) and minimums 24.2 °C (75.6 °F); December to February maximum temperatures average 25.7 °C (78.3 °F) and minimums 18 °C (64.4 °F).

The extreme north in the valley of the Senegal River has a hot arid climate (BWh) with a wet season largely confined to August and September and very high year-to-year variability with complete failure of the wet season not rare. Interior temperatures are higher than along the coast. For example, average daily temperatures in Kaolack and Tambacounda for May are 30 °C (86.0 °F) and 32.7 °C (90.9 °F) respectively, compared to Dakar's 23.2 °C or 73.8 °F., In the far interior of the country, in the region of Tambacounda, particularly on the border of Mali, temperatures can reach as high as 54 °C (129.2 °F).

=== Examples ===
Climate data for Dakar, Senegal (1981–2010)
Month	Jan	Feb	Mar	Apr	May	Jun	Jul	Aug	Sep	Oct	Nov	Dec	Year
Record high °C (°F)	39.6 (103.3)	38.7 (101.7)	40.4 (104.7)	38.4 (101.1)	36.2 (97.2)	36.6 (97.9)	36.9 (98.4)	35.0 (95.0)	36.2 (97.2)	39.3 (102.7)	40.3 (104.5)	39.5 (103.1)	40.4 (104.7)
Mean daily maximum °C (°F)	25.3 (77.5)	25.2 (77.4)	25.4 (77.7)	25.0 (77.0)	26.0 (78.8)	28.6 (83.5)	30.0 (86.0)	30.3 (86.5)	30.7 (87.3)	31.0 (87.8)	29.8 (85.6)	27.4 (81.3)	27.9 (82.2)
Mean daily minimum °C (°F)	18.3 (64.9)	18.0 (64.4)	18.5 (65.3)	19.2 (66.6)	20.7 (69.3)	23.5 (74.3)	25.1 (77.2)	25.3 (77.5)	25.2 (77.4)	25.3 (77.5)	23.3 (73.9)	21.0 (69.8)	22.0 (71.6)
Record low °C (°F)	11.0 (51.8)	10.7 (51.3)	10.9 (51.6)	14.0 (57.2)	15.4 (59.7)	17.0 (62.6)	17.2 (63.0)	20.0 (68.0)	20.0 (68.0)	17.2 (63.0)	17.0 (62.6)	12.4 (54.3)	10.7 (51.3)
Average rainfall mm (inches)	1.0 (0.04)	2.0 (0.08)	0.3 (0.01)	0.0 (0.0)	0.1 (0.00)	14.0 (0.55)	51.0 (2.01)	154.0 (6.06)	133.0 (5.24)	26.0 (1.02)	9.2 (0.36)	1.0 (0.04)	391.6 (15.41)
Average rainy days	1.0	1.0	1.0	0.2	0.4	3.0	8.0	15.0	12.0	4.0	1.0	1.0	47.6
Average relative humidity (%)	68	74	77	81	81	80	78	81	83	80	72	68	77
Mean monthly sunshine hours	244.9	245.8	276.0	288.0	291.4	252.0	232.5	223.2	219.0	257.3	249.0	238.7	3,017.8
Percentage possible sunshine	70	74	74	74	73	65	58	57	60	70	73	69	68
Source 1: Pogoda.ru.net
Source 2: Spiegel Online Wetter

Climate data for Saint-Louis
Month	Jan	Feb	Mar	Apr	May	Jun	Jul	Aug	Sep	Oct	Nov	Dec	Year
Record high °C (°F)	38 (100)	41 (106)	42 (108)	45 (113)	43 (109)	44 (111)	38 (100)	38 (100)	41 (106)	42 (108)	41 (106)	40 (104)	45 (113)
Mean daily maximum °C (°F)	30.5 (86.9)	32.2 (90.0)	32.7 (90.9)	31.7 (89.1)	30.3 (86.5)	30.4 (86.7)	30.7 (87.3)	31.5 (88.7)	32.3 (90.1)	33.7 (92.7)	33.4 (92.1)	31.0 (87.8)	31.7 (89.1)
Mean daily minimum °C (°F)	15.2 (59.4)	16.5 (61.7)	17.4 (63.3)	18.0 (64.4)	19.4 (66.9)	22.4 (72.3)	24.4 (75.9)	25.0 (77.0)	25.1 (77.2)	23.5 (74.3)	19.5 (67.1)	16.4 (61.5)	20.2 (68.4)
Record low °C (°F)	7 (45)	7 (45)	13 (55)	10 (50)	12 (54)	17 (63)	18 (64)	20 (68)	18 (64)	10 (50)	8 (46)	11 (52)	7 (45)
Average precipitation mm (inches)	1.5 (0.06)	1.9 (0.07)	0.2 (0.01)	0 (0)	0.1 (0.00)	6.8 (0.27)	40.2 (1.58)	94.3 (3.71)	92.3 (3.63)	23.0 (0.91)	0.3 (0.01)	0.7 (0.03)	261.3 (10.28)
Average relative humidity (%)	44.0	49.5	56.5	65.0	69.5	76.0	78.5	80.0	78.5	70.0	54.0	45.0	63.9
Mean monthly sunshine hours	241.8	238.0	275.9	285.0	282.1	222.0	244.9	248.0	228.0	260.4	246.0	232.5	3,004.6
Source 1: NOAA
Source 2: Weatherbase

Climate data for Matam (1961-1990 normals, extremes 1973–present)
Month	Jan	Feb	Mar	Apr	May	Jun	Jul	Aug	Sep	Oct	Nov	Dec	Year
Record high °C (°F)	45.4 (113.7)	48.4 (119.1)	46.2 (115.2)	48.5 (119.3)	48.5 (119.3)	49.0 (120.2)	48.2 (118.8)	45.6 (114.1)	47.0 (116.6)	45.0 (113.0)	46.0 (114.8)	42.5 (108.5)	49.0 (120.2)
Mean daily maximum °C (°F)	32.8 (91.0)	36.0 (96.8)	39.1 (102.4)	41.6 (106.9)	42.8 (109.0)	40.4 (104.7)	36.8 (98.2)	34.8 (94.6)	35.1 (95.2)	38.0 (100.4)	37.0 (98.6)	33.2 (91.8)	37.3 (99.1)
Daily mean °C (°F)	24.2 (75.6)	26.8 (80.2)	29.8 (85.6)	32.6 (90.7)	34.8 (94.6)	33.9 (93.0)	31.3 (88.3)	29.9 (85.8)	29.9 (85.8)	31.2 (88.2)	28.6 (83.5)	24.8 (76.6)	29.8 (85.7)
Mean daily minimum °C (°F)	15.5 (59.9)	17.6 (63.7)	20.5 (68.9)	23.6 (74.5)	26.8 (80.2)	27.3 (81.1)	25.7 (78.3)	24.9 (76.8)	24.7 (76.5)	24.3 (75.7)	20.1 (68.2)	16.3 (61.3)	22.3 (72.1)
Record low °C (°F)	10.0 (50.0)	10.0 (50.0)	12.0 (53.6)	16.0 (60.8)	19.0 (66.2)	17.0 (62.6)	18.5 (65.3)	17.4 (63.3)	14.8 (58.6)	18.8 (65.8)	14.0 (57.2)	11.0 (51.8)	10.0 (50.0)
Average precipitation mm (inches)	0.2 (0.01)	1.3 (0.05)	0.1 (0.00)	1.3 (0.05)	1.0 (0.04)	25.1 (0.99)	85.2 (3.35)	133.4 (5.25)	94.6 (3.72)	21.1 (0.83)	2.5 (0.10)	1.0 (0.04)	366.8 (14.43)
Mean monthly sunshine hours	266.6	252.0	291.4	297.0	297.6	270.0	272.8	257.3	252.0	275.9	270.0	176.7	3,179.3
Percentage possible sunshine	77	78	79	80	75	70	69	66	70	77	80	51	73
Source: NOAA

Climate data for Tambacounda
Month	Jan	Feb	Mar	Apr	May	Jun	Jul	Aug	Sep	Oct	Nov	Dec	Year
Record high °C (°F)	41.7 (107.1)	42.2 (108.0)	44.4 (111.9)	46.1 (115.0)	46.1 (115.0)	43.9 (111.0)	37.2 (99.0)	37.2 (99.0)	37.2 (99.0)	40.0 (104.0)	40.0 (104.0)	40.0 (104.0)	46.1 (115.0)
Mean daily maximum °C (°F)	35.0 (95.0)	37.2 (99.0)	38.9 (102.0)	41.1 (106.0)	39.4 (102.9)	36.1 (97.0)	32.2 (90.0)	30.6 (87.1)	31.7 (89.1)	33.3 (91.9)	35.0 (95.0)	33.9 (93.0)	35.4 (95.7)
Daily mean °C (°F)	25.0 (77.0)	26.7 (80.1)	29.2 (84.6)	31.1 (88.0)	31.9 (89.4)	29.7 (85.5)	26.7 (80.1)	26.1 (79.0)	27.0 (80.6)	27.5 (81.5)	26.1 (79.0)	24.5 (76.1)	27.6 (81.7)
Mean daily minimum °C (°F)	15.0 (59.0)	16.1 (61.0)	19.4 (66.9)	21.1 (70.0)	24.4 (75.9)	23.3 (73.9)	21.1 (70.0)	21.7 (71.1)	22.2 (72.0)	21.7 (71.1)	17.2 (63.0)	15.0 (59.0)	19.8 (67.6)
Record low °C (°F)	7.8 (46.0)	8.3 (46.9)	13.9 (57.0)	14.4 (57.9)	17.8 (64.0)	17.8 (64.0)	17.8 (64.0)	18.3 (64.9)	17.8 (64.0)	16.1 (61.0)	10.6 (51.1)	7.8 (46.0)	7.8 (46.0)
Average rainfall mm (inches)	1.0 (0.04)	1.0 (0.04)	0 (0)	2.0 (0.08)	21.1 (0.83)	127.0 (5.00)	182.9 (7.20)	256.0 (10.08)	223.0 (8.78)	70.1 (2.76)	2.0 (0.08)	1 (0.0)	887.1 (34.89)

Climate data for Kédougou
Month	Jan	Feb	Mar	Apr	May	Jun	Jul	Aug	Sep	Oct	Nov	Dec	Year
Mean daily maximum °C (°F)	34.7 (94.5)	37.4 (99.3)	39.1 (102.4)	40.0 (104.0)	38.9 (102.0)	34.3 (93.7)	31.3 (88.3)	30.6 (87.1)	31.6 (88.9)	33.3 (91.9)	34.7 (94.5)	34.1 (93.4)	35.0 (95.0)
Daily mean °C (°F)	26.3 (79.3)	29.0 (84.2)	31.2 (88.2)	32.9 (91.2)	32.4 (90.3)	29.1 (84.4)	26.9 (80.4)	26.3 (79.3)	26.7 (80.1)	27.5 (81.5)	27.0 (80.6)	25.6 (78.1)	28.4 (83.1)
Mean daily minimum °C (°F)	17.9 (64.2)	20.7 (69.3)	23.4 (74.1)	25.8 (78.4)	26.0 (78.8)	23.9 (75.0)	22.5 (72.5)	22.1 (71.8)	21.8 (71.2)	21.8 (71.2)	19.3 (66.7)	17.1 (62.8)	21.9 (71.3)
Average rainfall mm (inches)	0 (0)	0 (0)	0 (0)	5 (0.2)	52 (2.0)	169 (6.7)	267 (10.5)	317 (12.5)	275 (10.8)	111 (4.4)	8 (0.3)	0 (0)	1,204 (47.4)
Source: Climate-Data.org

Climate data for Ziguinchor
Month	Jan	Feb	Mar	Apr	May	Jun	Jul	Aug	Sep	Oct	Nov	Dec	Year
Record high °C (°F)	36.7 (98.1)	40.0 (104.0)	40.6 (105.1)	41.1 (106.0)	40.6 (105.1)	38.3 (100.9)	33.9 (93.0)	32.8 (91.0)	33.9 (93.0)	34.4 (93.9)	35.6 (96.1)	35.0 (95.0)	41.1 (106.0)
Mean daily maximum °C (°F)	32.2 (90.0)	34.4 (93.9)	35.6 (96.1)	35.6 (96.1)	35.0 (95.0)	33.3 (91.9)	31.1 (88.0)	29.4 (84.9)	30.6 (87.1)	31.7 (89.1)	32.2 (90.0)	30.6 (87.1)	32.6 (90.8)
Daily mean °C (°F)	24.5 (76.1)	25.8 (78.4)	27.5 (81.5)	27.5 (81.5)	28.6 (83.5)	28.6 (83.5)	27.2 (81.0)	26.4 (79.5)	27.0 (80.6)	27.5 (81.5)	27.0 (80.6)	24.5 (76.1)	26.8 (80.3)
Mean daily minimum °C (°F)	16.7 (62.1)	17.2 (63.0)	19.4 (66.9)	19.4 (66.9)	22.2 (72.0)	23.9 (75.0)	23.3 (73.9)	23.3 (73.9)	23.3 (73.9)	23.3 (73.9)	21.7 (71.1)	18.3 (64.9)	21.0 (69.8)
Record low °C (°F)	11.1 (52.0)	12.2 (54.0)	13.9 (57.0)	15.6 (60.1)	18.3 (64.9)	21.7 (71.1)	20.6 (69.1)	20.6 (69.1)	19.4 (66.9)	20.6 (69.1)	17.2 (63.0)	14.4 (57.9)	11.1 (52.0)
Average rainfall mm (inches)	1 (0.0)	1 (0.0)	0 (0)	0 (0)	10.9 (0.43)	120.9 (4.76)	351.0 (13.82)	556.0 (21.89)	357.1 (14.06)	154.9 (6.10)	5.1 (0.20)	1 (0.0)	1,558.9 (61.26)
Source: Worldwide Bioclimatic Classification System

=== Climate change ===
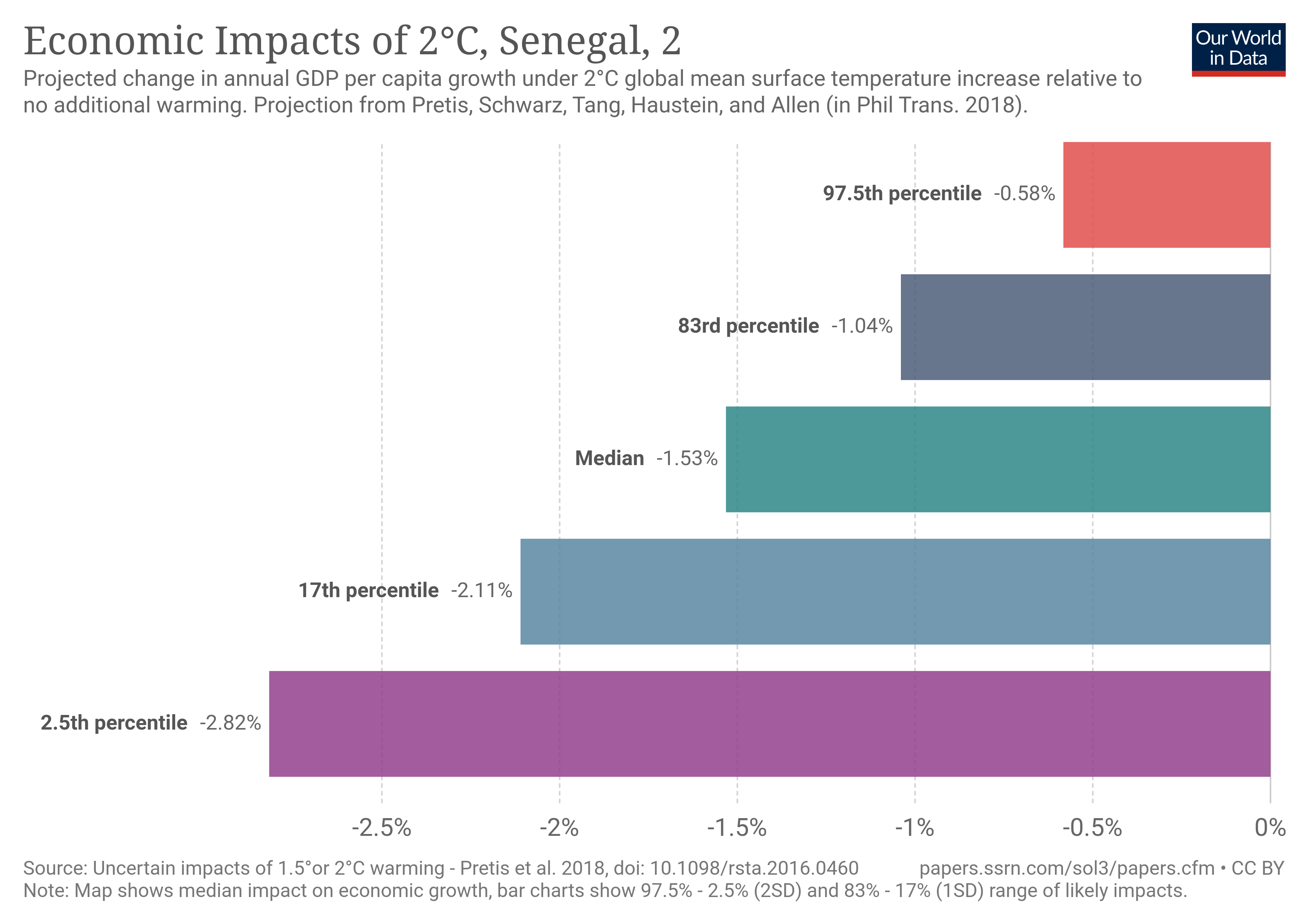
Economic impact of 2°C in Senegal

Climate change in Senegal will have wide reaching impacts on many aspects of life in Senegal. Climate change will cause an increase in average temperatures over west Africa by between 1.5 and 4 °C (3 °F and 7 °F) by mid-century, relative to 1986–2005. Projections of rainfall indicate an overall decrease in rainfall and an increase in intense mega-storm events over the Sahel. The sea level is expected to rise faster in West Africa than the global average. Although Senegal is currently not a major contributor to global greenhouse gas emissions, it is one of the countries most vulnerable to climate change.

Extreme drought is impacting agriculture, and causing food and job insecurity. More than 70% of the population is employed in the agricultural sector. Sea level rise and resulting coastal erosion is expected to cause damage to coastal infrastructure and displace a large percentage of the population living in coastal areas. Climate change also has the potential to increase land degradation that will likely increase desertification in eastern Senegal, leading to an expansion of the Sahara.

Climate change adaptation policies and plans are important to help Senegal prepare and adapt. In 2006, Senegal submitted its National Adaptation Programme of Action (NAPA) to the United Nations Framework Convention on Climate Change. The NAPA identifies water resources, agriculture, and coastal zones as the country's most vulnerable sectors. In 2015, Senegal released its Intended Nationally Determined Contributions (INDC's) that indicated climate change would be treated as a national priority.

== Ecology ==
Senegal has a number of vegetation zones: sahel, Sahel-Sudan, Sudan (region), Sudan-Guinea, tropical rainforest, and Guinean mangroves. Most of the southern Casamance arm of the country has been classified by the World Wildlife Fund as part of the Guinean forest-savanna mosaic ecoregion.

See also:.

- Vegetation zones of Senegal 2
- Vegetation zones of Senegal 3

== Extreme points ==
This is a list of the extreme points of Senegal, the points that are farther north, south, east or west than any other location.

- Northernmost — unnamed location on the border with Mauritania in the Senegal River immediately north-west of the town of Podor, Saint-Louis Region
- Easternmost — unnamed location on the border with Mali near the confluence of the Balin-Ko river and the Falémé River, Kédougou Region
- Southernmost — unnamed location on the border with Guinea immediately south of the village of Toile, Kédougou Region
- Westernmost — Pointe des Almadies, Cap Vert peninsula, Dakar Region*
- *Note: this is also the westernmost point of the mainland African continent

== Gallery ==
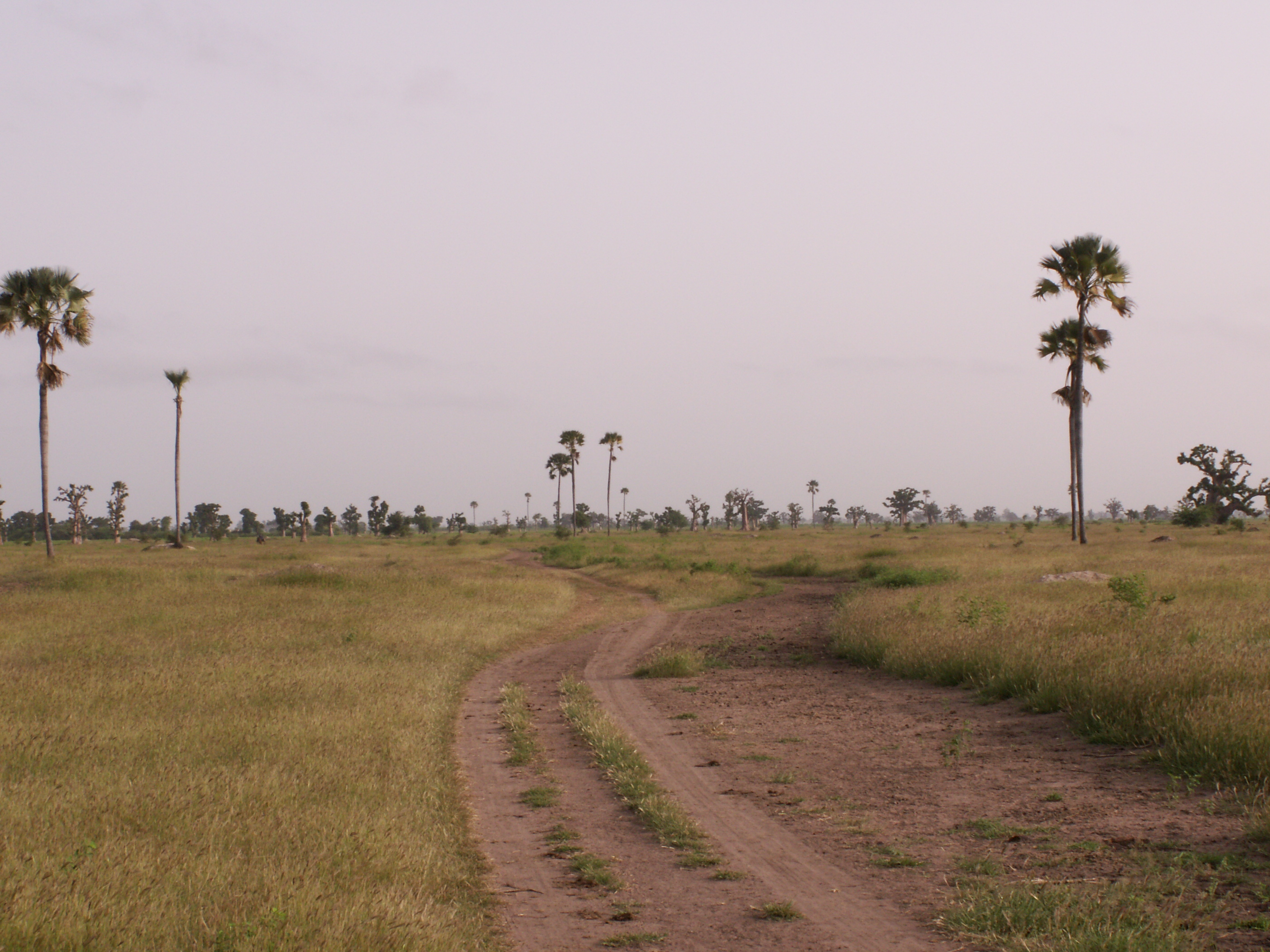
Senegalese savanna.

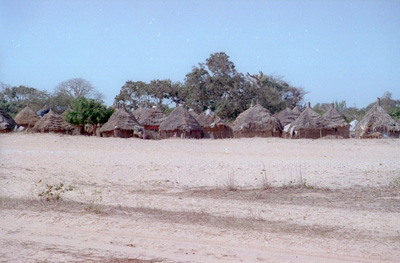
Homes in the countryside.

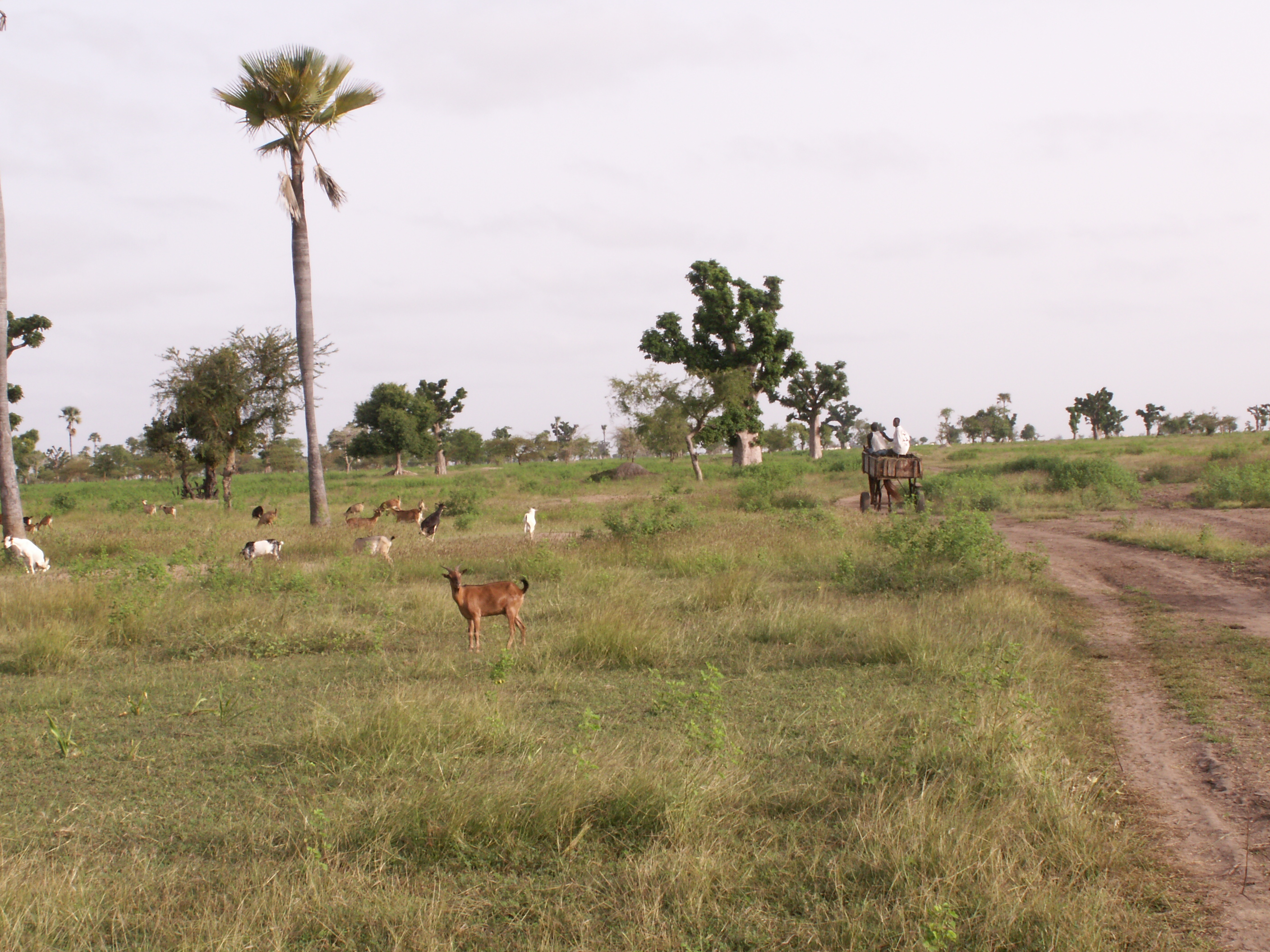
Senegalese savanna with goats

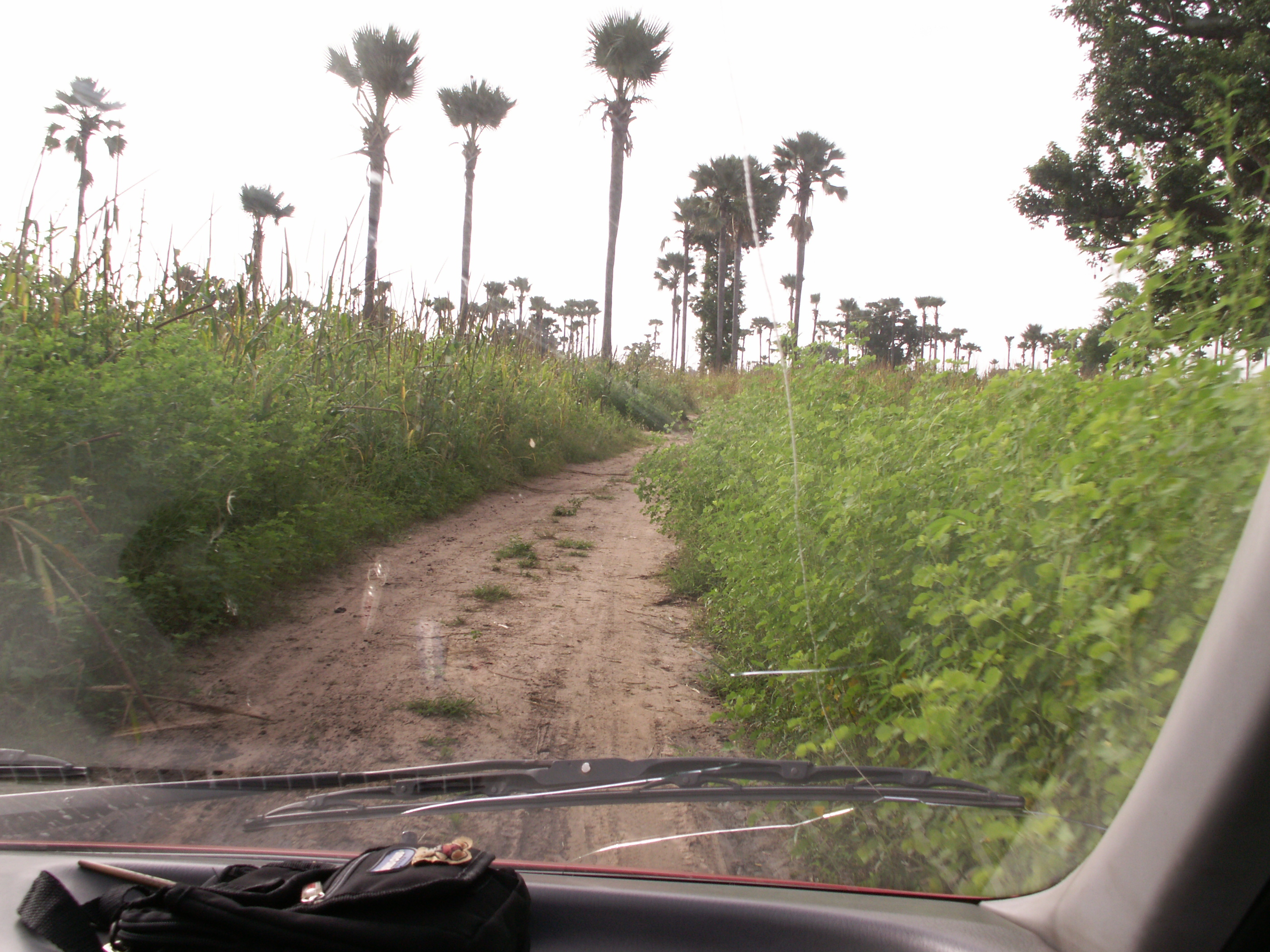
Senegalese savanna with high grass

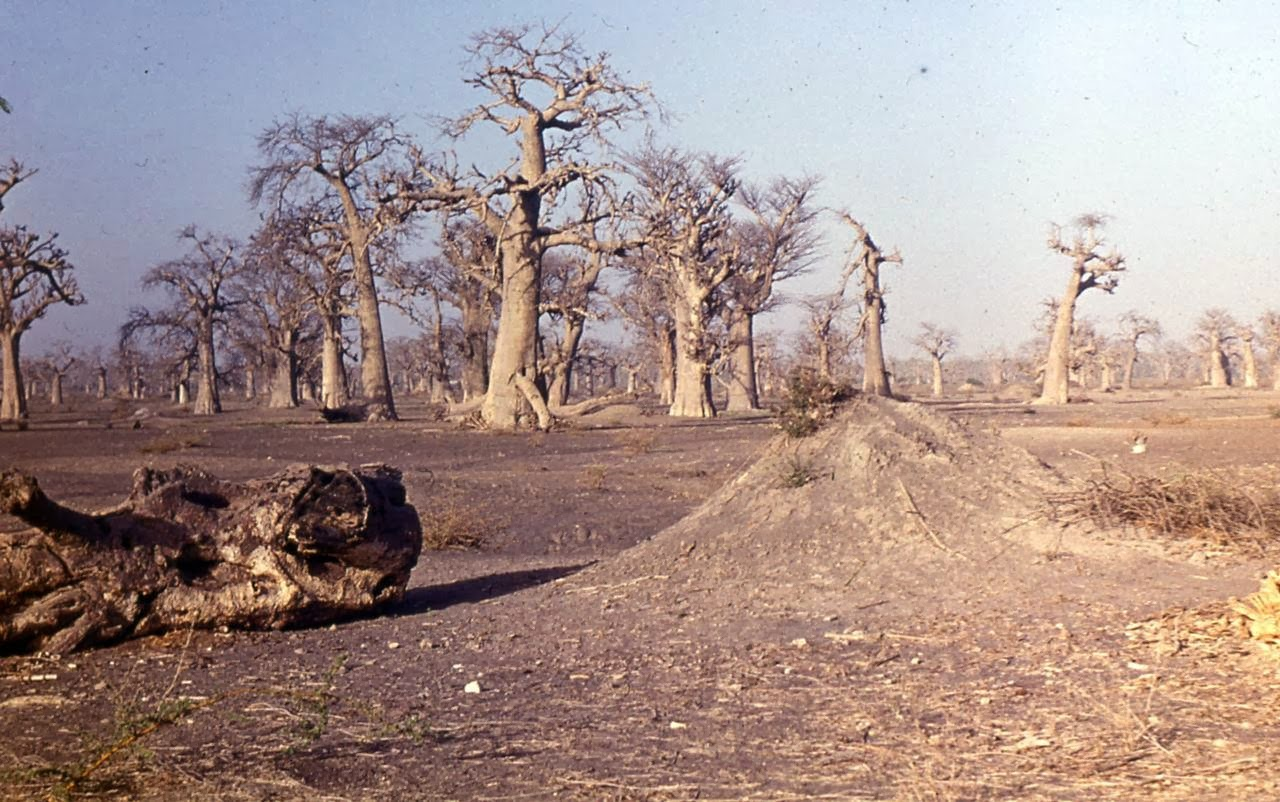
Grove of baobabs
