= Agriculture in Senegal =

Economic sector in Senegal

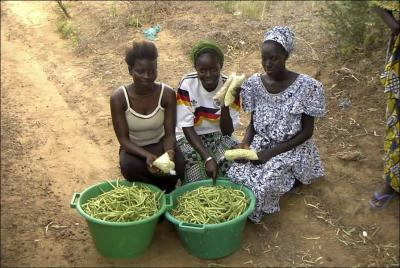
Cowpea vendors near Thies, Senegal

Agriculture is one of the dominant parts of Senegal's economy, even though Senegal lies within the drought-prone Sahel region. As only a tiny percentage of the land is irrigated, Senegal continues to rely on rain-fed agriculture. Agriculture occupies about 75% of the workforce. Despite a relatively wide variety of agricultural production, most farmers produce for subsistence needs. Millet, rice, corn, and sorghum are the primary food crops grown in Senegal. Production is subject to drought and threats of pests such as locusts, birds, fruit flies, and white flies. Moreover, the effects of climate change in Senegal are expected to severely harm the agricultural economy due to extreme weather such as drought, as well as increased temperatures.

Senegal is a net food importer, particularly for rice, which represents almost 75% of cereal imports. Peanuts, sugarcane, and cotton are important cash crops, and a wide variety of fruits and vegetables are grown for local and export markets. In 2006, gum arabic exports soared to $280 million, making it by far the leading agricultural export. Green beans, industrial tomato, cherry tomato, melon, and mango are Senegal's main vegetable cash crops. The Casamance region, isolated from the rest of Senegal by Gambia, is an important agricultural producing area, but without the infrastructure or transportation links to improve its capacity.

Despite the lack of modernization of artisanal fishing, the fishing sector remains Senegal's main economic resource and major foreign exchange earner. The livestock and poultry sectors are relatively underdeveloped and have potential for modernization, development and growth. Senegal imports most of its milk and dairy products. The sector is inhibited due to low output and limited investments. The potential production of fauna and forest products is high and diversified, and could, if well organized, benefit poor farmers in rural areas. Although the agricultural sector was impacted by a locust invasion in 2004, it has recovered and gross agricultural production is expected to increase by 6.1% in 2006 and 5.1% in 2007.

== Islam and Agriculture in Senegal ==
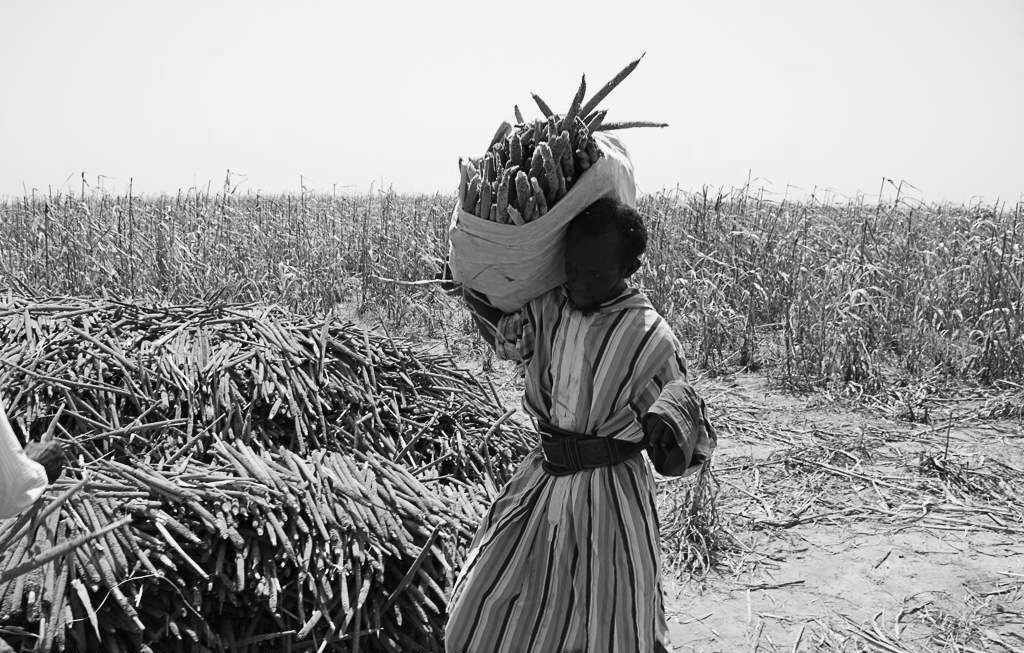
A Mouride disciple working in the fields of Khelcom

Agriculture has long been an important aspect of economic and social life in the Senegambian region. Since the nineteenth century, agricultural production has been closely associated with the growth of Islamic forms of organisation, in particular the Mouride order. While it is not precisely known when Islam initially arrived in the region, it was not until the seventeenth century that Islamic styles of organisation were able to increasingly influence agriculture and other spheres of Senegalese society (Linares 1992). In the nineteenth century, Islam became increasingly prevalent across the country, largely due to the work of Cheikh Amadou Bamba Mbacke (1853-1927), the founder of the Mourridiyya, which to this day remains one of the most popular and economically influential Sufi orders of Senegal. The influential prophet established various marabout republics whose teachings were organised in agricultural daaras (sg. daara). In these community spaces, followers of Bamba would support one another through the income of agricultural labour. The discipline of labour in conjunction with a religiously inspired work ethic was the integral tenet of the formation, which came to foster these intensely community-oriented agricultural spaces. These were spaces of open community and certainty throughout political upheaval, guerrilla warfare and anti-colonial and anti-monarchical struggles. The centrality of the importance of education, agriculture and spirituality made them spaces largely open to all castes, ethnicities, and classes.

Colonial French policies combatting economic uncertainty in the late 19th century advocated the development of peanut cultivation as a cash crop. Peanut, a widely useful resource for its culinary as well as oil-based purposes, initially expanded in a distinct area of West-Central Senegal. Later, these initial policies led to a further two waves of peanut expansion in 1910 and 1940. The 1910 growth of the peanut basin is widely attributed to a greater proximity of relations between Amadou Bamba Mbakke and the French colonial administration. Initially suspicious of one another, the French realised that Shaykh Bamba posed little political threat and was more interested in the religious and spiritual development of the people. The French began to collaborate with Mouride leadership, enlisting their widespread popular support to expand the workforce of the speculative peanut investment markets and production. The colonial administration encouraged the territorial expansion of the Mouride brotherhoods, the state allowing favourable access to forested areas. The daaras, pioneer agricultural-spiritual groups, were encouraged to spread throughout the Terres Neuves, clearing forest and engaging in the French mono-cropping agricultural policy. The Islamisation of Senegal thus went alongside the French colonial agricultural policies, where peanut prices were dependent on an uncertain global market.

The expansion was, however, diverse in its impacts across the country. Wolof groups' expansion, deeply connected to teachings of the Mouride brotherhood, in the North-Western stretches of the Terres Neuves corridor, has been demonstrative of some of the most aggressive and destructive agricultural practises seen in Senegal, where production was done with an almost exclusively short-term economic prioritisation of agriculture, with little consideration of wider environmental impacts. Other expansions by Serer groups were shown to be significantly more tuned to the needs of soil nutrients and encouraged a style of agriculture which was significantly more capable at supporting and sustaining the land on a long-term basis. While Jola peanut production only showed a connection to the Islamic religious organization in more contemporary times.

Contemporary agricultural practises continue to be influenced by Islamic beliefs and practises. For example, in Touba, the burial site of Shaykh Amadou Bamba, which continues to emerge as a growing centre of Senegalese Islamic pilgrimage, surrounding agricultural practises work to facilitate and encourage pilgrimage.

== Situation and outlook on the agricultural sector ==
With over 77 percent of the workforce employed in it and a GDP contribution of about 15 percent, agriculture is a key economic indicator. Despite the significance of agriculture, Senegal is located in the Sahel region, which is prone to drought and has patchy rainfall and generally subpar soils. As a result, almost 70% of Senegal's food requirements are satisfied by imports. Rice, wheat, corn, onions, palm oil, sugar, potatoes, and onions are the top agricultural imports into Senegal. For American producers interested in the Senegalese market, export growth may be possible for sauces, mixed condiments, seasonings, and beef and beef products. Agriculture is the main focus of President Macky Sall's economic agenda, which calls for $4 billion in investments. Massive investments in irrigation and rural roads are required by the agricultural plan, along with the construction of storage facilities, the expansion of the fishing industry, the establishment of an agricultural stock exchange market, and access to financing through the establishment of a Guarantee Fund. Senegal received $11 million worth of American agricultural exports overall in 2018. Soybean oil ($7 million), prepared foods ($1 million), sugar, sweeteners, and beverage bases ($919,000), other feeds & fodders ($883,000), and planting seeds ($317,000) are the top domestic export product categories. Food and agricultural exports from the United States to Senegal totaled $19.5 million in the calendar year 2017, or 1% of all exports of these goods to the Senegalese market. As of 2017, bulk and intermediate products made up 89 percent of all agricultural exports from the United States to Senegal.

== Agricultural commodities ==
=== Peanuts ===
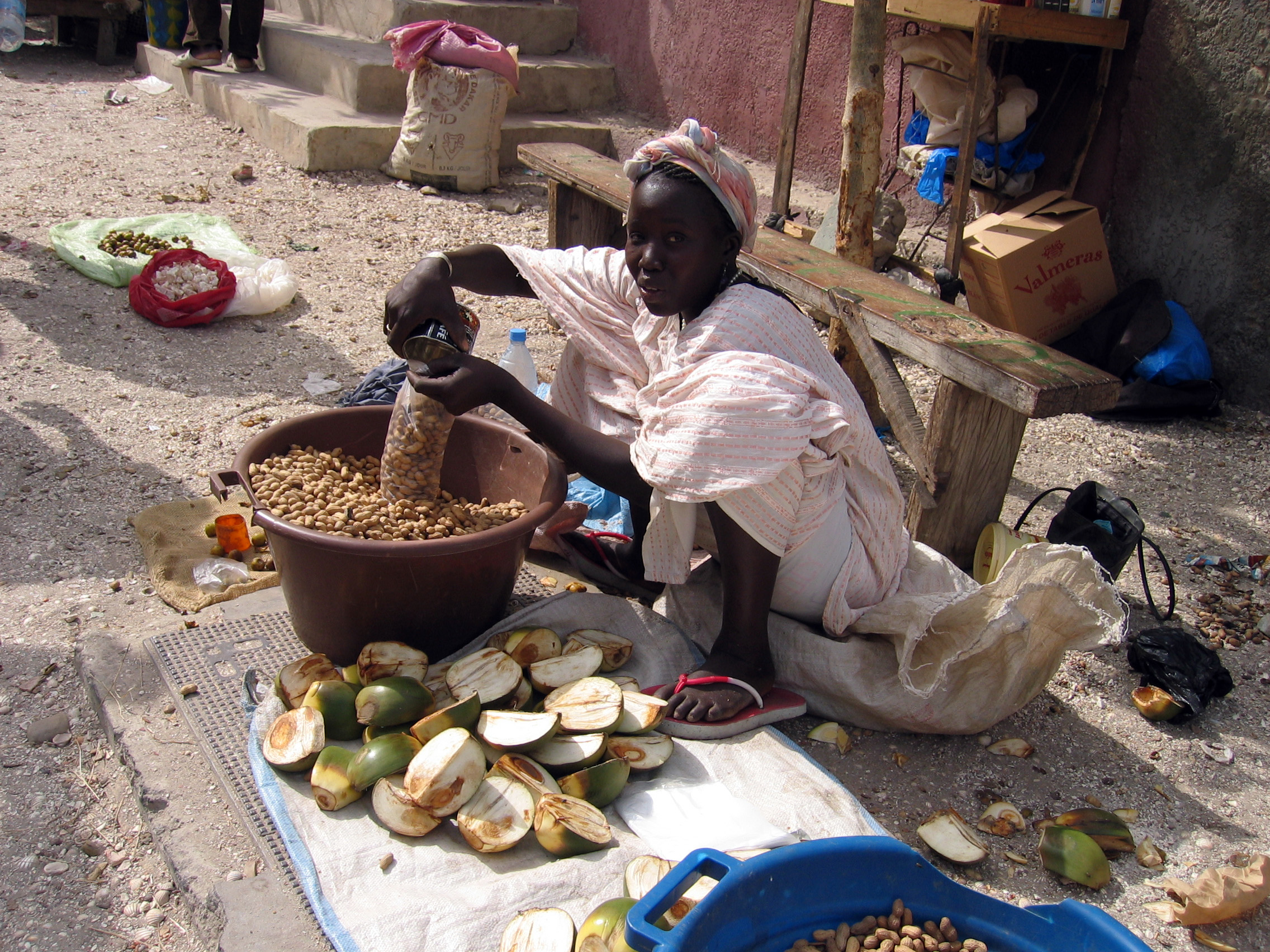
A peanut seller in Joal-Fadiouth, Senegal

Peanut production accounts for around 40% of cultivated land, taking up 2 million hectares, and provides employment for as many as 1 million people. Although the peanut sector's contribution to foreign exchange earnings has dropped below those of fishing and mining, peanuts continue to play an important role in the overall economy as the main cash crop for many rural Senegalese farmers. Peanuts are processed locally, and prices of processed peanut oil and other peanut products are set by a government-controlled commission.

Production of unshelled peanuts varies widely because of periodic drought, and production is frequently underreported because of unauthorized sales to processors in neighbouring countries. Total production was estimated at 850,000 tons in 2005. Exports of peanut products reached about CFA 15 billion ($30 million) in 2005. They account for some 60% of total agricultural exports, 75% of which is made up of peanut oil. SUNEOR's (former SONACOS) exports of peanut oil account for 45% to 50% of the world market trade in peanut oil.

SUNEOR produces approximately 150,000 tons of crude peanut oil per year. The European market, which is its main market, can currently absorb only 90,000 tons. The newly privatized company plans to explore and develop new markets to fully utilize its capacity. Exports of peanut oil to the U.S. resumed in 2006 and were estimated at $7 million. Other major peanut oil producers include NOVASEN and the Complex of Touba.

All these three companies produce mainly non-refined peanut oil and non-grilled peanuts for export. Peanut meal/cake is predominantly sold in the local market as animal feed. The local industry also refines imported edible oils for domestic consumption. In 2005, Senegal imported approximately 90,000 tons of crude soybean oil, primarily from Brazil.

=== Cotton ===
Cotton is the second largest agricultural export, accounting for around 16% of total agricultural exports. It is grown in nearly every region and covers almost one-third of cultivated acreage. However, production is concentrated in the South-Eastern part of the country, south of the Kahone–Tambacounda belt, as well as in the Casamance and Kédougou regions.

SODEFITEX, the main cotton company, forecasts production at 40,000 tons in 2006. Cotton accounts for approximately 3% of total exports and is the third source of export earnings for Senegal (some $23 million in 2005). Most cotton lint produced in Senegal is exported, but since the liberalization of the sector in 1984, producers have preferred selling in parallel markets, where they benefited from better prices. SODEFITEX, which manages most of Senegal's cotton production, was privatized in November 2003. Producers acquired 30% of the company's shares (they had no equity interest prior to privatization). Despite stronger incentives (credit to producers and guaranteed producer prices), the company is still striving to use its ginning capacity fully.

The government of Senegal is committed to participating in the U.S. government-funded West Africa Cotton Improvement Program (WACIP) in support of activities that focus on crop diversification and value-added processing.

=== Food grains ===
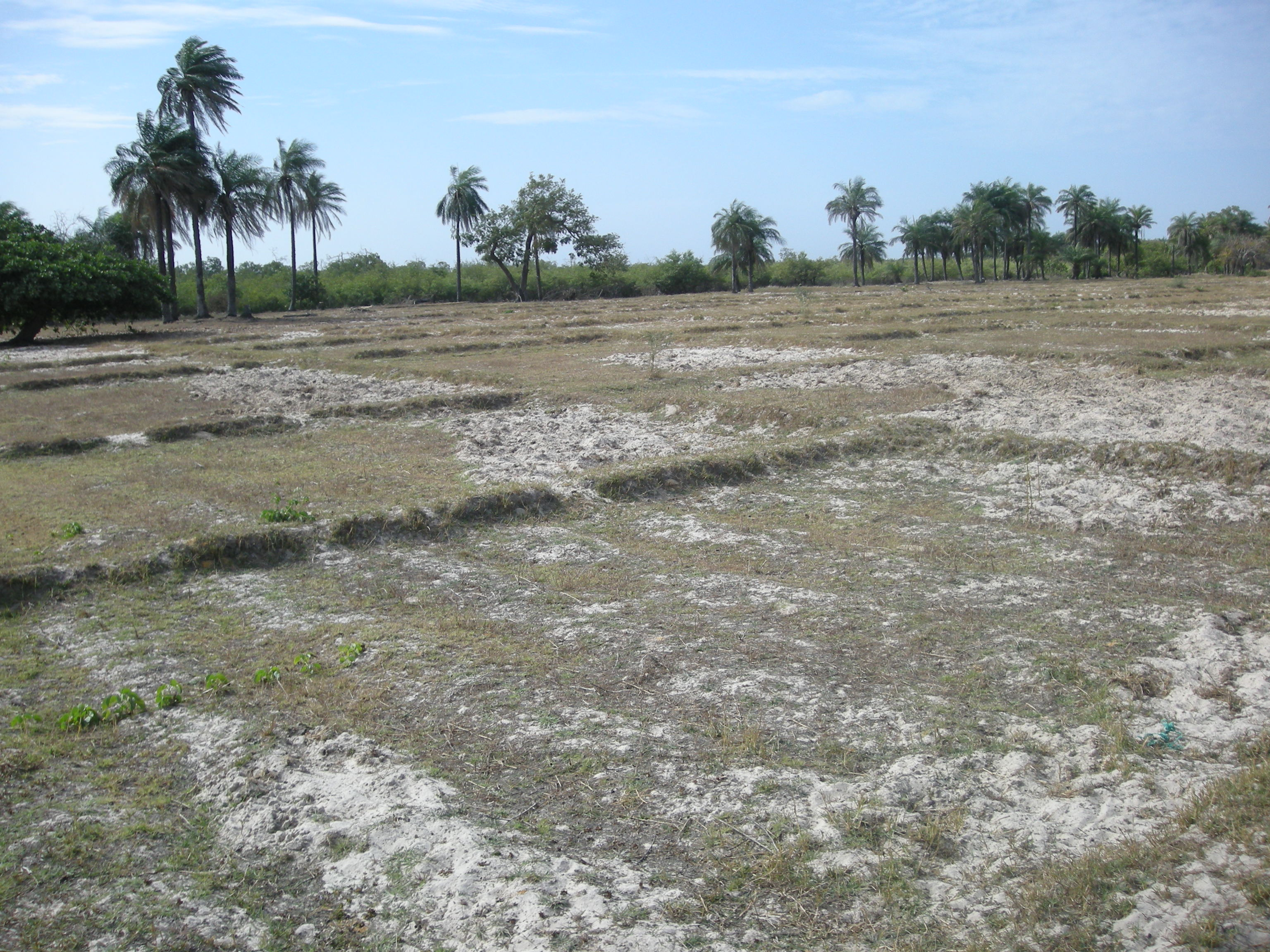
A rice paddy near Carabane after the harvest

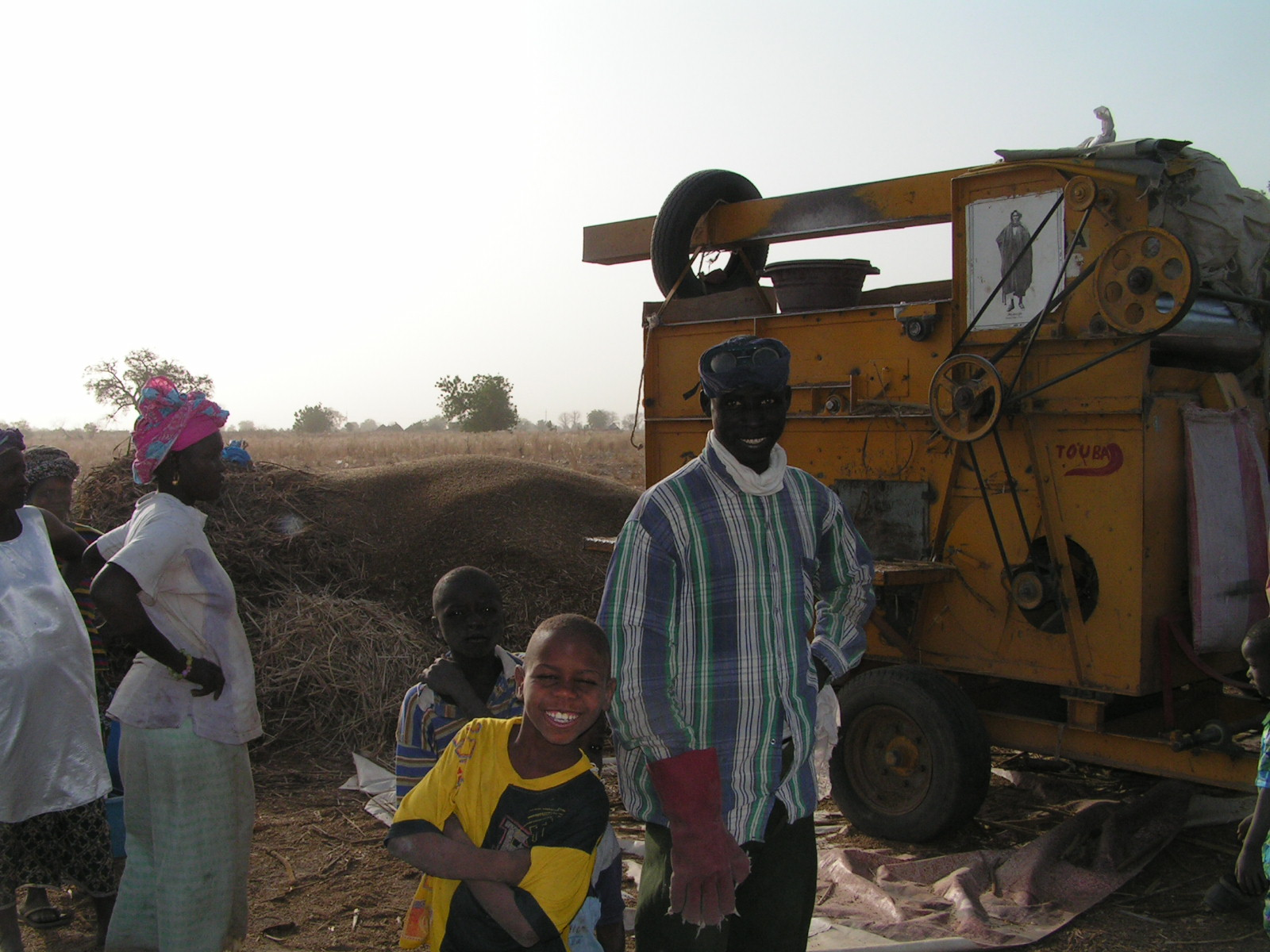
Threshing millet in Malem-Hodar

Rice, millet and sorghum are the main subsistence food crops for Senegal's rural population. Corn and fonio are also important cereal crops. Production of cereal food crops, such as rice, millet, corn and sorghum - which is often grown in rotation with peanuts - does not meet Senegal's needs. Only in years of good rainfall does the country approach self-sufficiency in millet, corn, sorghum and fonio. Local production increased significantly in the early 2000s following the government's decision to subsidise fertilizer and encourage corn production, and thus reduce reliance upon peanuts.

In 2005/06, the total production of cereals (including milled rice) is estimated at 1,177,782 MT, which will cover some 60% of the consumption needs. However, given the segmentation of the rice market (see GAIN SG6002), this production will less likely affect imports. However, in years of poor rainfall and other natural disasters, the shortfall in coarse grains, especially millet, could be more difficult to cover because of low availability and trade of this grain in the region. Climate change in Senegal is likely to result in reduced yields of key crops, including sorghum and millet, placing pressure on rural livelihoods. Such constraints have been overcome with an increase in rice imports, with a shift from millet to rice consumption in households who can afford it.

Senegal is the second largest rice importer in Africa, ahead of Côte d'Ivoire and behind Nigeria. Senegal's imports reached 1,113,000 MT in 2005, with net imports estimated at 854,000 MT. Consumers' preference is for 100% broken rice originating from Asia, mainly Thailand and India, and recently from Brazil, Uruguay and Argentina. Per capita rice consumption continues to grow and is estimated at 70 to 75 kilograms, and total annual consumption is estimated at 700,000 MT. Local rice production meets about 20% of the country's needs, and 30% of this production is used for subsistence. In 2005/06, local production of rice paddy was estimated at 265,000 MT.

The wheat sector has been controlled for years by two flourmills, Grands Moulins de Dakar and Sentenac, which buy about 90% of their wheat from France. (See SG7002) In 2001, NMA became the country's third flour and feed mill. The demand for wheat flour is increasing, as the demand for bread increases along with population growth and changes in consumption habits. Senegal imported 326,287 MT of wheat in 2005 and more than half of this quantity in the first half of 2006 (180,514 MT).

Senegal imported United States wheat most recently in 2004 and again in 2006, making the U.S. the third largest supplier after France and Argentina. U.S. wheat is used for blending because of its high protein content compared to French soft wheat. Despite significant increases in the price of wheat in the international markets, the government froze flour and bread prices in November 2006, following strong pressure from consumers' unions. The millers' price of flour is currently CFA 264,000 per MT, and the price of a baguette remains at CFA 150 instead of CFA 175 proposed by bakers' associations. ($1 = CFA 507 on January 10, 2007.)

=== Horticultural products ===
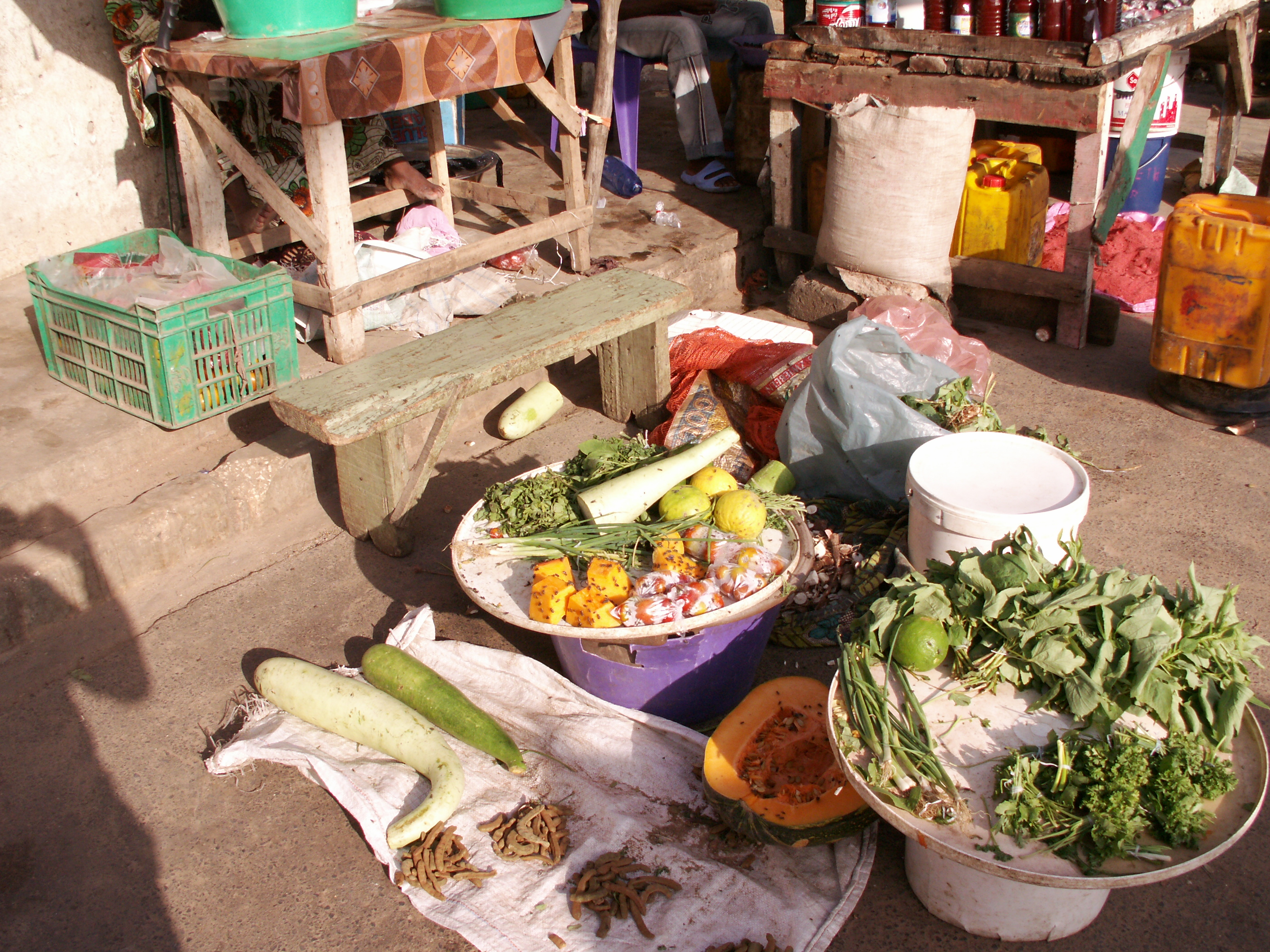
Vegetables and fruit sold at M'bour

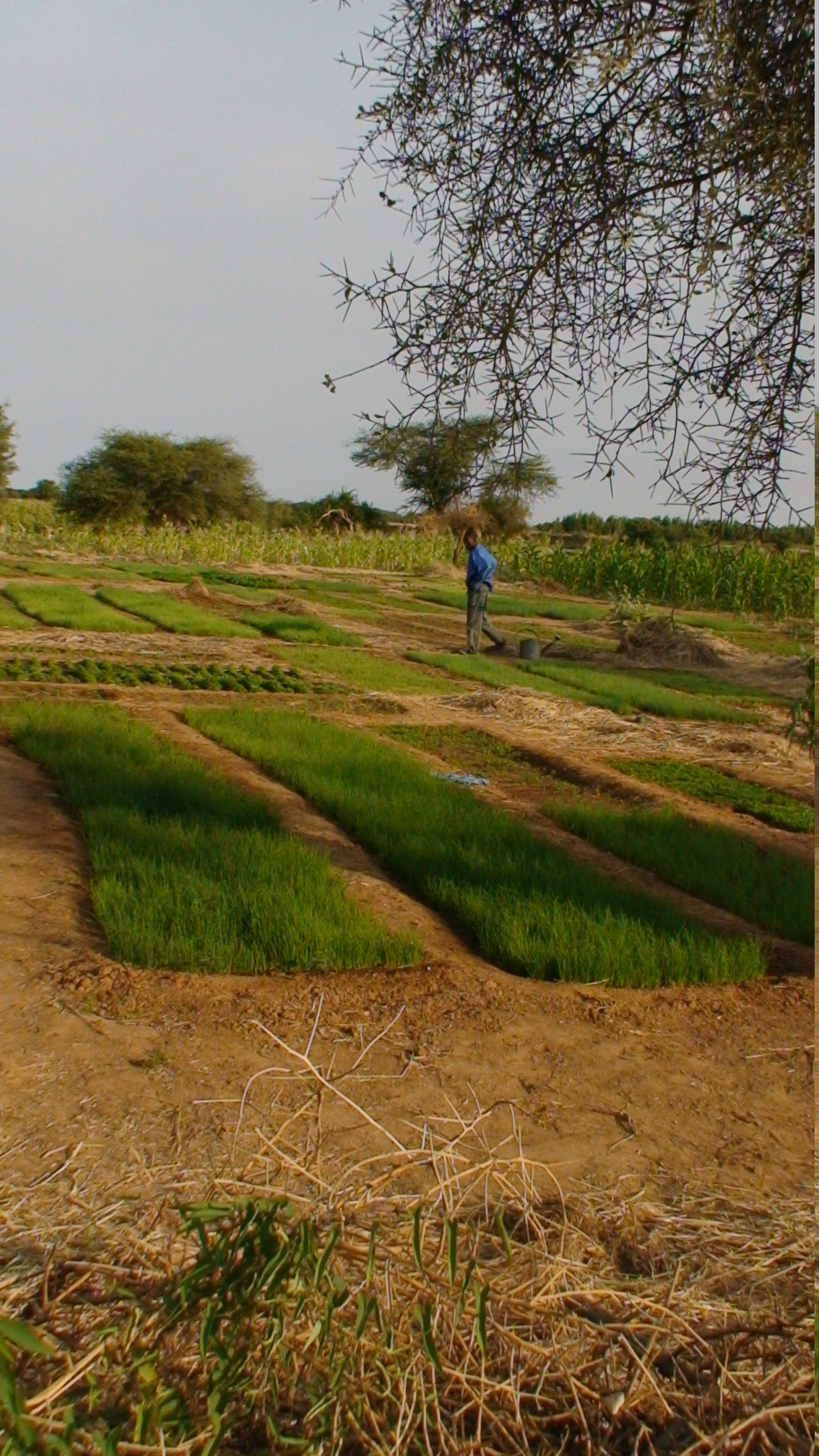
Onion fields in Ndiawar, Senegal

Senegal's total horticultural production was estimated at 584,000 MT in 2004. Exports of fruits and vegetables are growing steadily, although they remain low, and it is estimated that they will reach approximately 50,000 tons in 2007. Europe is still the main export market for Senegal's fresh fruits and vegetables. About 70% of the European market is dominated by four products, including green beans, cherry tomato, mango and melon. With the increase in size and value of the European market, pre-packed produce such as green beans has promising prospects in the European market, and with the possibility to introduce first-stage processing, this produce will likely reach other markets. Under AGOA and its related projects, Senegal's horticultural sector is making efforts to enter the U.S. and North American markets.

However, in order for Senegal to benefit from these opportunities, Senegal needs to address phytosanitary concerns, improve existing value chains (improved ocean transportation of green beans, extension of the market of cherry tomato, increase the competitiveness of melon and expand the seasonality of mango). The fruit and vegetable industry involves about 20 active companies grouped into 2 federations (ONAPES and SEPAS). 3 companies are involved through the whole chain (production, packaging, trade), exporting more than 50% of the produce alone. About 10 medium-sized companies export 200 to 500 tons, and the others are small enterprises usually serving as suppliers to major exporters. A warehouse for fresh produce is being built at Dakar's airport, and other infrastructure is being built to improve storage and transportation to Europe, thereby maintaining quality and increasing value.

The potential for the production of industrial tomatoes is high, especially along the Senegal River valley. However, the current level of production of double-concentrate tomato paste does not meet Senegal's needs, estimated at 18,000 tons. In 2003, the total production of fresh tomatoes was estimated at 53,000 tons, which yielded about 8,000 tons of paste, representing only about 45% of the domestic needs. SOCAS, the main processing company with the capacity of 15,000 tons, has been importing triple concentrate to cover the deficit (5,000 tons in 2004 and 2,000 tons in 2005).

At the same time, the imports of double concentrate are regularly increasing from 2,900 tons in 2003 to 5,500 tons in 2004. Agroline, the other major company, has been operating since 2003 with a capacity of 3,300 tons of double concentrate, representing 7% of the tomato paste market. Agroline has been using imported or local triple concentrate, which it processes and packages into double concentrate. This company is considering extending its market share through the establishment of a new agro-industrial plant in Taredji, northern Senegal, which will produce triple concentrate from fresh tomatoes. This project will start in 2007. Farm gate industrial tomato prices and incentives will have to improve for Senegal to produce more of its paste from local tomatoes. The processors face stiff competition from imports of final products such as tomato sauces, juice and ketchup.

The overall potential of the horticultural sector is limited by the presence of various pests (including fruit and white flies), and therefore needs technical assistance to develop in-country SPS capacity for meeting international standards, and infrastructure to increase the efficiency of surveillance and compliance. Senegal also needs to work with its regional partners to harmonize phytosanitary standards and procedures, strengthen pest surveillance and detection capabilities, including border inspection operations, develop risk assessment capabilities, and overcome other bottlenecks related to regulatory issues and trade.

=== Sugar ===
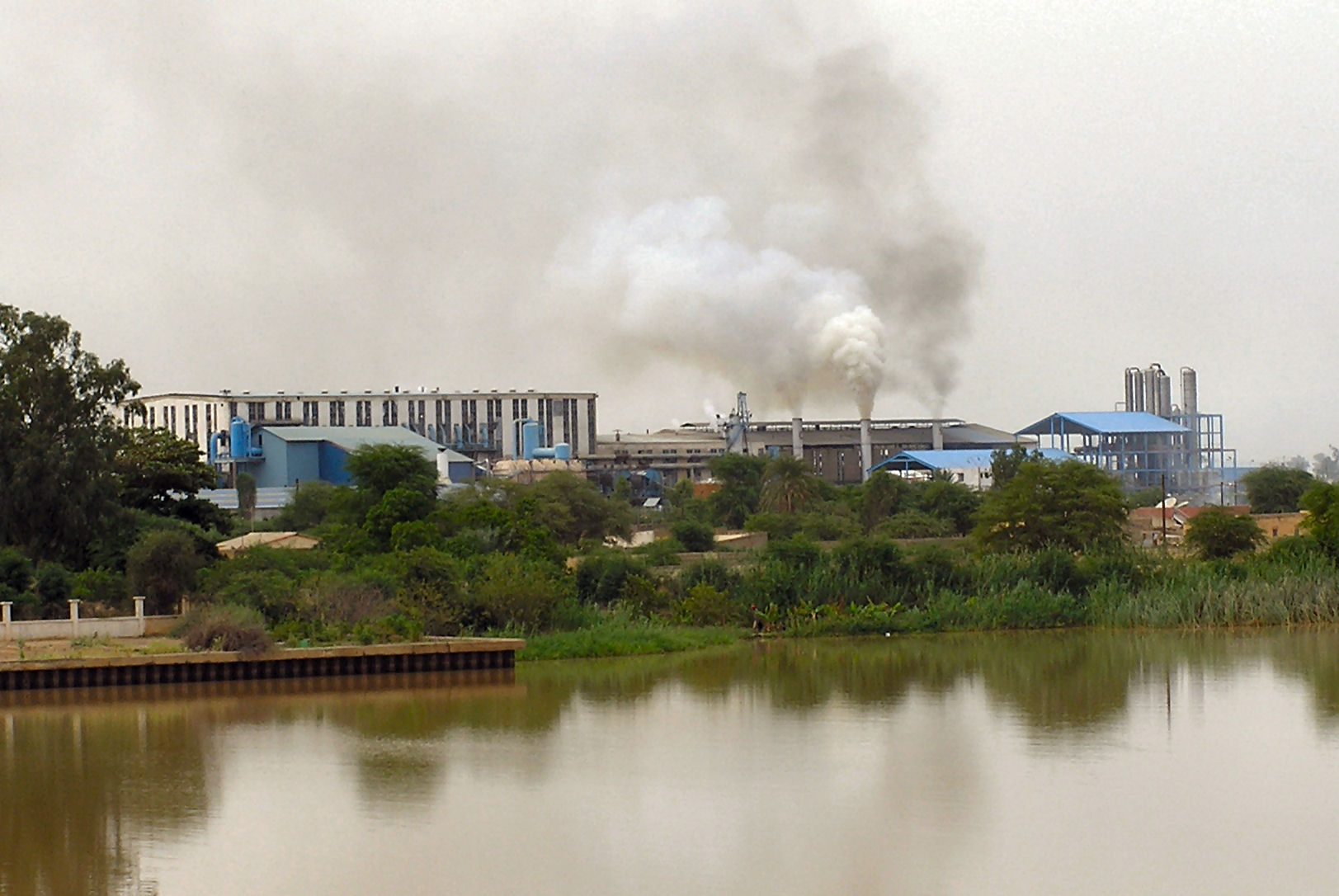
The Compagnie Sucrière Sénégalaise sugar refinery at Richard-toll

The production of sugar in Senegal started back in September 1972, when the Compagnie Sucrière Sénégalaise, CSS, produced its first sugar cubes. CSS benefits from a de facto monopoly and subsidies from the government, which maintain its capacity to plant and process sugar cane, then refines and commercializes the sugar produced in the forms of cubes, powder and crystallized sugar. This year, CSS's production was estimated at 800,000 tons of sugar cane, from which nearly 90,500 tons of sugar were produced. With an average yield of 120 tons/hectare, CSS cultivates 7,500 hectares of commercial cane on the Senegal River valley in northern Senegal. The company employs 3,000 permanent workers and 2,000 seasonal workers.

During the period 2002–2005 CSS faced serious competition from illegal imports of cheaper sugar, mainly from Mauritania, which grows cane and processes sugar in the same river valley on the other side of the border. These imports were estimated at 30,000 to 40,000 tons. These imports have decreased significantly in 2006 according to CSS authorities with the support of Customs services. CSS's ambition is to increase its production to meet the national consumption level of 150,000 tons of sugar. This will require a production of 923,000 to 1 million tons of cane. CSS is reported to have the processing capacity to reach this level of production, but it will have to increase its cultivated area by 500 hectares. Currently, CSS imports 33,000 tons of sugar to compensate for the deficit. In 2006, these imports cost about $875 thousand to the company.

=== Livestock ===
The livestock population includes 3.1 million cattle, and 8.7 million sheep and goats. Most cattle systems use feed lots. Despite a significant livestock population, Senegal remains a net importer of meat, especially live sheep during periods of peak consumption (major religious holidays and events). The total production of meat was about 100,000 tons in 2003, which is equivalent to a per capita consumption of 11.5 kg below the government's objective of 14 kg.

=== Dairy products ===
In Senegal, the milk industry is primarily based on the use of imported milk powder. Senegal's milk production is far below the domestic needs. Despite relatively high tariffs on milk powder (26.78%), about 20,000 tons of milk powder are imported each year, primarily from Europe. In fluid milk equivalent, imports represent twice the level of local milk production. Imports of other dairy products are estimated at $100 million in 2006. Importers of powder milk form a strong political lobby and dominate the dairy industry. Local producers are not well organized except for the few modern producers in the major cities.

Part of the imported milk powder is processed and marketed through informal channels, for which little information is reported. The main products available in the market are sweet concentrate milk, unsweetened concentrated milk, and milk powder (in bulk or packaged in bottles or small bags). A few companies produce yogurt.

The local milk production system relies on climatic conditions, with higher production during the rainy season and a slowdown and even stoppage during the 7-month-long dry season. Non-governmental organizations and donors assist small rural milk producers to improve the distribution systems and increase their capacity to access urban markets. In this perspective, PAPEL, the government's main livestock and dairy development project, has rehabilitated the rural milk collection network set up by Nestlé-Senegal in 1991 in the sylvo-pastoral zone.

This project is helping develop small-scale milk processing units with simple equipment and techniques. Most of these units are found in the Northern and Southern parts of the country, particularly in and around Saint-Louis, Dahra, Tambacounda, Velingara and Kolda. In the Niayes zone around Dakar, other well-structured milk processing units benefit from this support and were able to commercialize up to 300,000 liters of milk in Dakar in 2005. The most important of these milk farms is the Wayembam farm and the farms of the Regional Association of Women Cattle Breeders, Dirtel. Other major players in the milk market include Nestlé-Senegal, SATREC, CCMB, Saprolait, and Les Mamelles Jaboot.

=== Poultry ===
The poultry industry has been increasing its overall production since the announcement in 2005 of the ban on imports of chicken meat, despite the shock created in early 2006 by avian influenza. The sector represents 17% of the animal industry's contribution to GDP and employs about 10,000 people.

In 2003, there were 3.2 million chickens producing 5,982 tons of meat. Because of massive imports of low-quality and cheap chicken parts from Europe and Brazil, the sector decreased its production by 24% from 2001 to 2003. This has prompted the creation of poultry farmers' unions, who claimed the loss of 3,000 to 5,000 jobs, and the government's decision to ban imports of frozen chicken in October 2005. This ban is still underway and applies to all countries. As a result of this ban, local production increased by 21%. However, because the ban was only effective in January 2006, import orders prior to the ban were authorized, and in 2004, 13,700 tons of chicken meat were imported.

Local production is estimated at 7 million chickens in 2005, which represents a 33% increase compared to 2004. Chicken meat production represents about 75% of this production, and total industrial production of chicken meat has increased to 9,200 tons in 2005, representing a 26% increase compared to 2004. Traditional production (home production) is difficult to evaluate, but could be estimated at 8,000 tons of meat. Preliminary government reports suggest that these trends will continue in 2006 with a significant increase in local production of chicken meat. However, these trends also suggest that the production of eggs will decrease significantly as a result of the competing chicken meat, and professionals fear that the sector might not be able to meet Senegal's needs in chicken eggs, which may prompt a partial lift of the ban.

Most of the inputs of chicken feed are imported. In 2005, about 85,000 MT of chicken feed were produced. Corn accounts for 60% of ingredients. Producers prefer soy and corn products to peanut cakes because of their better quality and lower costs. Fish meal is another available and important source of protein for the industry. In 2005, the cost of feeding accounted for 59% of poultry farms' total expenditures, which made the sector less competitive vis-à-vis imported poultry products.

Senegal exports chicken meat to Guinea Bissau (194 Mt in 2005) and day-old chickens to The Gambia, Mauritania, Mali, Burkina Faso and Guinea Bissau (238,250 in 2005).

=== Fisheries ===
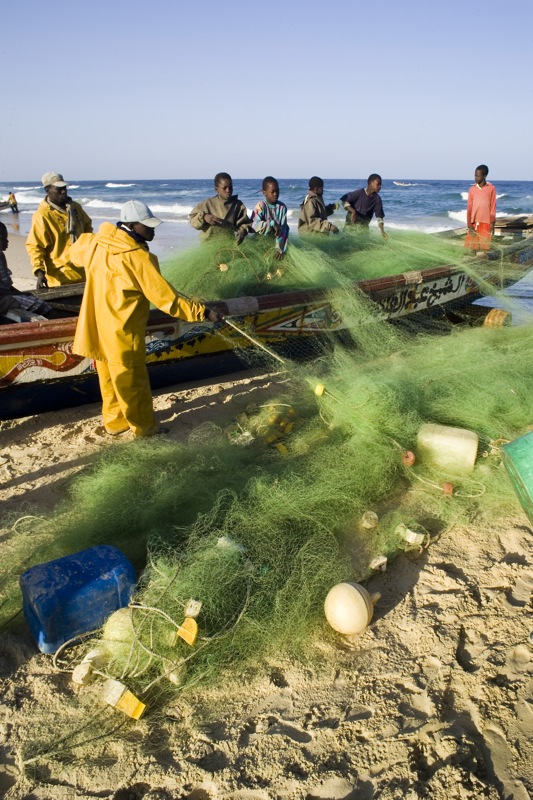
Fishermen in Senegal

The fishing sector benefits from a long coastline (approximately 448 miles) and a productive continental shelf area of approximately 9,653 square miles. Industrial fishing consists of sardine, tuna and trawler harvesting (shrimp, mullet, sole, cuttlefish, etc.). "Artisanal" catches are mainly for the local market, with a large proportion purchased by local factories for processing. Senegal's fishing sector has historically been one of the country's largest sources of foreign currency.

In 2005, seafood products represented 22% of Senegal's total exports and generated more than $366 million in national income from an annual catch of approximately 40,000 tons, against approximately $374 million for a catch of approximately 430,000 tons in 2004. The fishing industry is also a key sector for employment. At the local level, thousands of families depend on fish as a nutritional staple. The Government estimates that the sector employs more than 200,000 people and generates significant temporary employment in the informal sector, in particular through artisanal fishing, using lines, traps, and nets with small-scale traditional fishing canoes.

The European Union is the largest market for Senegal's seafood exports. Senegal signed seventeen agreements with the EU allowing EU fishing craft access to Senegalese water while setting export quotas and limits, and requiring that part of the catch, especially tuna, be supplied to local processing industries. The 2002–2006 Senegal/EU agreement, which provided for an annual compensation of $15 million to the Government of Senegal, expired in June 2006. Negotiations to renew it are currently suspended following strong denunciation of previous agreements by Senegalese fishermen's associations for alleged overexploitation of high-value fish, declining incomes, and limiting the availability of high-value fish in the local markets. The Government of Senegal and local environmental organizations have also expressed concerns about the possible permanent ecological damage caused by the more sophisticated and efficient EU fleets.

Several large Senegalese fish processing companies have ceased operations because of Senegal's small and unproductive fishing fleet, high costs of production, over-exploitation, scarcity of high-value fish, and lack of investment resources. This crisis is reported to be one of the main causes of clandestine emigration from Senegal's major fishing communities to Europe over the last two years, with the death of hundreds of young people, mostly fishermen. White grouper fisheries in Senegal's waters have collapsed.

=== Forest products ===
In Senegal, the contribution of forest and other natural resources to the economy is not visible, although it is real and important. The potential production of fauna and forest products is high and diversified, but this sector is not fully accounted for in the macroeconomic indicators. Officially, the sector represents less than 1% of GDP. However, the production of forest resources, mainly charcoal and wildlife, is estimated at $50 million yearly.

Data collected in 2006 by UICN from producers, brokers and consumers of wild plant and animal products indicate that most of the non-wood plants, wild animals, and continental fish are commercialized and only a small proportion is used for consumption. The economic importance of forest products varies by region, but they account for up to 50% of the revenues of poor rural households. The value of these products, which are usually not included in the national statistics, is estimated at least $19 to $35 million. Gum arabic exports, which are not included in the figures, soared to over $280 million in 2006.

== Production resources and inputs ==
The construction of the Diama and Manantali Dams in 1986 created an additional 240,000 hectares of land which can be irrigated on the Senegalese side of the Senegal River in northern Senegal. This gave the country the potential to diversify its crop base and increase food production. However, operation of the upstream dam has also reduced annual floods along the floodplain, where an ancient and productive form of recessional irrigation has been practiced for hundreds of years. Recessional irrigation is still practiced along these floodplains for an estimated 50,000 hectares.

The best agricultural land along the Senegal River is in the alluvial valley between Bakel and Dagana, and this area is the most densely populated part of the valley. As the floods retreat each year, a variety of crops (including millet, sorghum, rice, and vegetables) are sown, and they grow and mature quickly. These areas also provide pasture for livestock. But because rainfall has been lower in Guinea in 2006, the water table of the Senegal River and its effluents was at a critical level and comparable to a dry year as of early 2007. This situation was expected to limit the recession and dry season productions.

In addition, pests such as insects and locusts have been reported on peanuts, cowpeas, and sorghum. In northern Senegal, rice production will likely be seriously affected this year by the extensive invasion of grain-eating birds - the red-billed quelea (Quelea quelea).

During this growing season, the Government has subsidized the agricultural sector at a level of about $40 million. This investment included the purchase of 40,000 tons of peanut seeds, payments to peanut producers of up to $10 million, the purchase of seeds of special crops such as sesame, cassava, corn, and hisbiscus sabdarifa (bissap), and the subsidy of fertilizers. The government has also contributed $10 million for the purchase of farming equipment.

== Agricultural policies and institutional framework ==
=== Agricultural policies ===
Senegal's agricultural policies are historically characterized by the following key features: The government's agricultural support system is mainly based on cash crops that have reliable markets. Agricultural research has significantly contributed to maintaining productivity despite irregular rainfall and poor soils. Liberalization of the market of agricultural produce in the early 1990s has improved the efficiency of the cereal market.

The impact of the liberalization has been limited because peanuts still dominate the market; integrated extension, input distribution, credit, and marketing support systems contribute in boosting productivity, especially cash crops and government promoted new crops; yet, support to farmers is costly and inefficient, particularly because the government responds more to political pressure than to economically motivated schemes; literacy programs are not devoted due attention in rural areas, and this limits the efficiency of extension and farm-level adoption of technologies, and therefore farmers capacity to respond to market dynamics.

In response to increasing rural migration and clandestine emigration, the government launched a new plan, called REVA ("Return to Agriculture"). The objective of this program was to develop agricultural infrastructure (construction of rural roads, rehabilitation of wells, and connection to electricity) and provide training and production tools and equipment to young and female farmers, especially former clandestine emigrants. The pilot phase of the program started in August 2006 and ended in December 2008; the government aimed to implement 550 production sites during this period. This plan gained increasing support from donors until it was discovered that the plan ended up giving large amounts of land to politicians and religious leaders, causing the plan to be effectively stopped in the early 2010s.

=== Government ministries ===
The institutional framework of the agricultural sector is organized through two main ministries. The Ministry of Agriculture, Biofuels and Food Security which includes the Directorate of Agriculture responsible for the implementation of food grains and agro-industrial development policies and for overseeing the field based extension services; the Directorate of Horticulture which coordinates government support to the horticultural sector; the Directorate of Agricultural Census; and the Directorate of Plant Protection responsible for government pest control programs, including regulations, management of standards, and various field interventions. The second ministry involved in the agricultural sector is the Ministry of Animal Husbandry, with several services coordinating government support to the livestock, dairy and poultry sub-sectors.

These services are completed by research and training institutions. ISRA (Senegalese Agricultural Research Institute) is the leading agricultural research institution and works on various issues related to crop and animal production, SPS and veterinary issues, fishing and forest products and rural socio-economy. Other major research institutions are ITA (Food Technology Institute), CDH (horticultural research) and WARDA (The Africa Rice Center). Senegal also has agricultural and veterinary colleges, which provide most of the human resources used in the sector. The main schools are ENSA (the Agricultural College), EISMV (The Inter-states Veterinary College), and CDH (The Horticultural Development Training Center).

=== Major international donors ===
Major donors involved in the agricultural sector in Senegal include FAO, USAID, USDA, the World Bank, the African Development Bank, the West African Development Bank, the French government, the Peace Corps and several other local and international NGOs. USAID includes Senegal in its "Feed The Future" program which promotes agriculture through increased productivity in market connections. The overall goal is to reduce poverty and empower Senegalese farmers.

== See also ==
- Economy of Senegal
