= Ecological Monitoring Centre, Senegal =

The Ecological Monitoring Centre (Centre de Suivi Écologique (French)(CSE) is a Senegalese environmental institution. It is dedicated to genomics and ecological data observation in Senegal. CSE is responsible for managing the adaptation fund in Senegal. The adaptation fund was created by the Kyoto Protocol to help developing nations offset the effects of global warming. CSE receives "proposals, distribute(s) the money and monitor(s) funded projects". Arona Soumare, who is the conservation director with the West African Marine Ecoregion of the World Wildlife Fund (WWF), works with CSE as an expert.

CSE is a key source of information for Senegalese policymakers regarding the environment.
