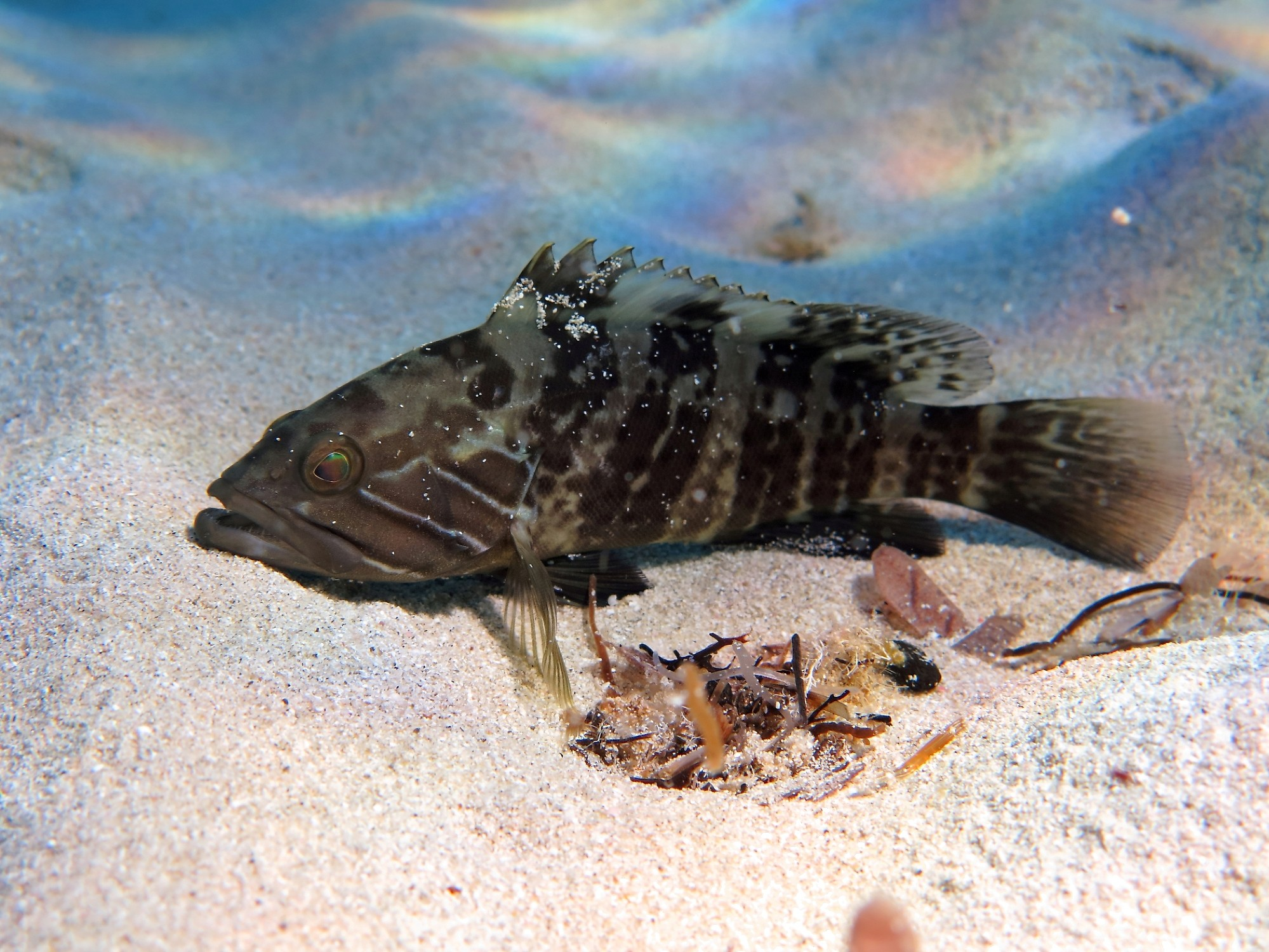

Conservation status
- Near Threatened (IUCN 3.1)

Scientific classification
- Kingdom: Animalia
- Phylum: Chordata
- Class: Actinopterygii
- Order: Perciformes
- Family: Epinephelidae
- Genus: Epinephelus
- Species: E. aeneus

Binomial name
- Epinephelus aeneus (Saint-Hilaire, 1817)

Synonyms
- Serranus aeneus Geoffroy Saint-Hilaire, 1817; Cherna aenea (Geoffroy Saint-Hilaire, 1817); Perca robusta Couch, 1832

= White grouper =

Species of fish

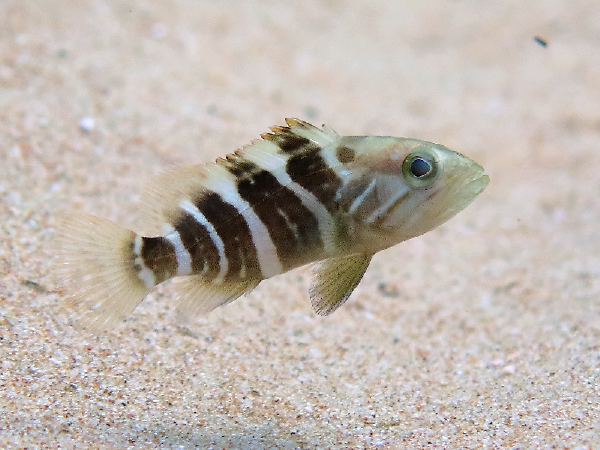
Epinephelus aeneus juvenile

The white grouper (Epinephelus aeneus) is a species of marine ray-finned fish, a grouper from the subfamily Epinephelinae which is part of the family Serranidae, which also includes the anthias and sea basses. The white grouper is found in the subtropical eastern Atlantic Ocean and the southern Mediterranean Sea.

== Description ==
The white grouper has a head which is longer than its body is deep, the standard length being 3 to 3.6 times the depth of the body. The dorsal profile is convex between the eyes. The preopercle is angular and has with 3 to 6 large spines at its angle, the lowest being directed downwards. The dorsal fin contains 10-11 spines and 14-16 soft rays while the anal fin has 3 spines and 7-9 soft rays. The caudal fin is rounded and the body is covered in small scales which are set within thick skin. There are over 90 scales in the lateral line. The overall colour is greenish bronze with darker fins which are brownish purple and have white or pale margins. There are 3 or 4 pale blue or white lines across the gill cover, these can be quite faint in larger adults. The juveniles have faint dark spots on their body which create 5 indistinct dark vertical bars. The juveniles also have indistinct dark spots on the fins. The maximum total length this species has been recorded at is 120 centimetres (47 in), although they are more common at around 60 centimetres (24 in), and the maximum published weight is 25 kilograms (55 lb).

== Distribution ==
The white grouper is found in the eastern Atlantic Ocean from southern Portugal and southern Spain south along the western coast of Africa as far south as Angola, including the islands in the Gulf of Guinea. Its occurrence in the Canary Islands and Madeira needs to be verified. It is found in the southern and eastern Mediterranean but appears to be expanding its range northwards being formerly absent north of 44°N in the Adriatic Sea and to be absent from the central Mediterranean but there have been records from Corsica and Monaco, among other recent northerly Mediterranean Sea records. There is a history of vagrancy in this species and the synonym Perca robusta was based on a specimen taken in Cornwall in southwestern England.

== Habitat and biology ==
The white grouper occurs on substrates of rock or mud and sand while the juveniles are found in coastal lagoons and estuaries, and adults are found at depths between 20 and 200 metres (66 and 656 ft). This is a carnivorous species and off West Africa it was found that 58% of their diet is made up of fishes, 21% of stomatopods, 10% of crabs and 10% of cephalopods. There is a seasonal migration of this species off the coasts of Senegal and Mauritania, which is linked to an upwelling off the coasts of those nations. They are protogynous hermaphrodites with the females reaching sexual maturity on attainment of a total length of 50 to 60 centimetres (20 to 24 in) and at an age of 5–7 years and the sex change to males occurs when they are 10 to 13 years old. Off Tunisia this species spawns during June and July while in Iskenderun Bay in Turkey, spawning starts in early June and continues up to late August.

== Taxonomy ==
The white grouper was first formally described in 1817 as Serranus aeneus by the French naturalist Étienne Geoffroy Saint-Hilaire (1772-1844) with the type locality given as Egypt.

== Utilisation ==
The white grouper is a very important quarry species for fisheries throughout its range, fishermen use hook-and-line and trawls to catch it. In Senegalese waters, artisanal fishers are the main landers of this species, however, there is a local commercial fishery which is set up for the export market, mainly to Europe. Overfishing is the major threat to the white grouper. Even where protected it has been targeted by poachers using spear guns and lights at night. It has been bred in aquaculture at the Israeli National Center for Mariculture. It is marketed fresh or preserved by smoking.
