= Climate change in Senegal =

Emissions, impacts and responses of Senegal related to climate change

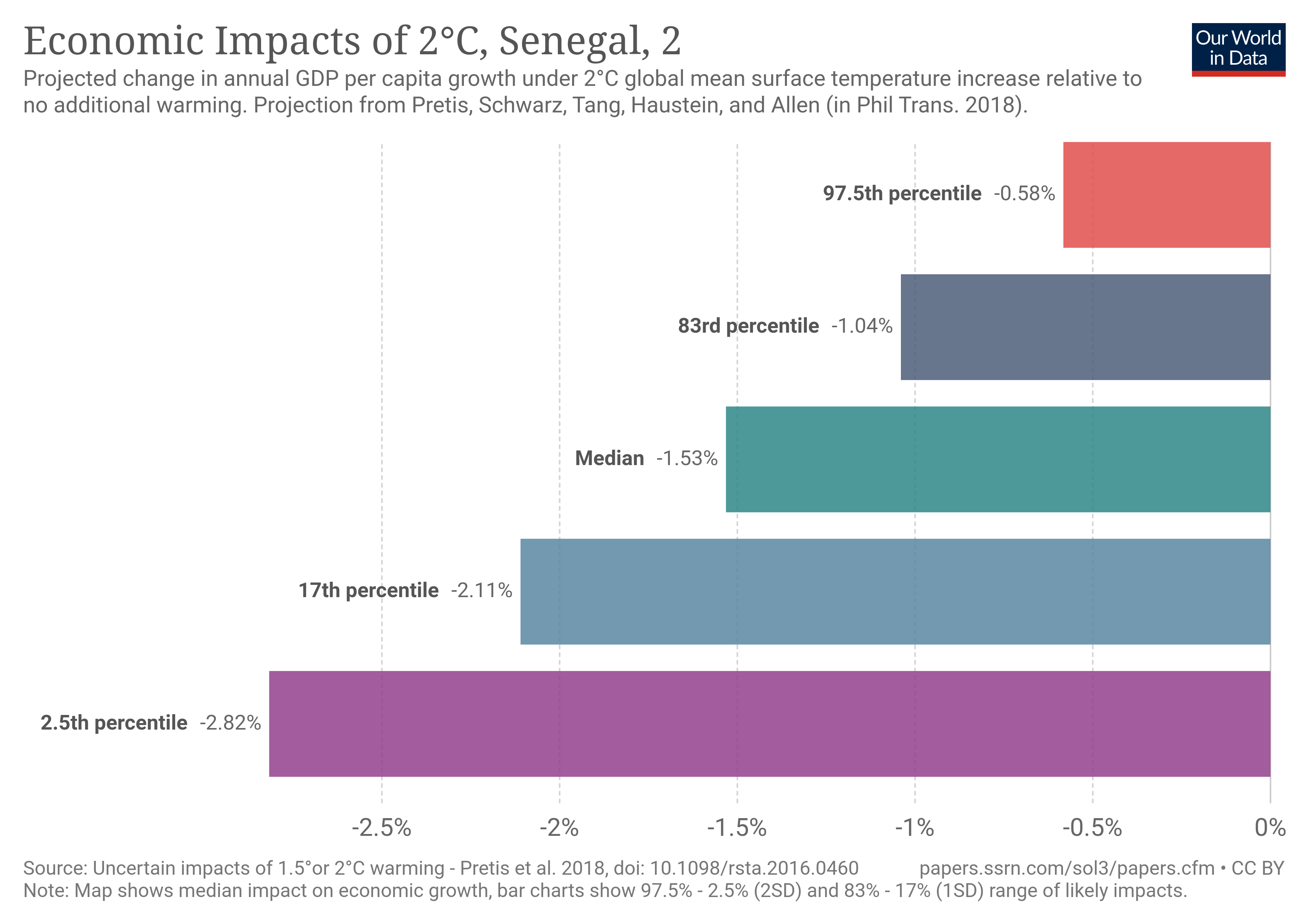
Economic impact of 2°C in Senegal

Climate change in Senegal will have wide reaching impacts on many aspects of life in Senegal. Climate change will cause an increase in average temperatures over west Africa by between 1.5 and 4 °C (3 °F and 7 °F) by mid-century, relative to 1986–2005. Projections of rainfall indicate an overall decrease in rainfall and an increase in intense mega-storm events over the Sahel. The sea level is expected to rise faster in West Africa than the global average. Although Senegal is currently not a major contributor to global greenhouse gas emissions, it is one of the countries most vulnerable to climate change.

Extreme drought is impacting agriculture, and causing food and job insecurity. More than 70% of the population is employed in the agricultural sector. Sea level rise and resulting coastal erosion is expected to cause damage to coastal infrastructure and displace a large percentage of the population living in coastal areas. Climate change also has the potential to increase land degradation that will likely increase desertification in eastern Senegal, leading to an expansion of the Sahara.

Climate change adaptation policies and plans are important to help Senegal prepare and adapt. In 2006, Senegal submitted its National Adaptation Programme of Action (NAPA) to the United Nations Framework Convention on Climate Change. The NAPA identifies water resources, agriculture, and coastal zones as the country's most vulnerable sectors. In 2015, Senegal released its Intended Nationally Determined Contributions (INDC's) that indicated climate change would be treated as a national priority.

== Greenhouse gas emissions ==
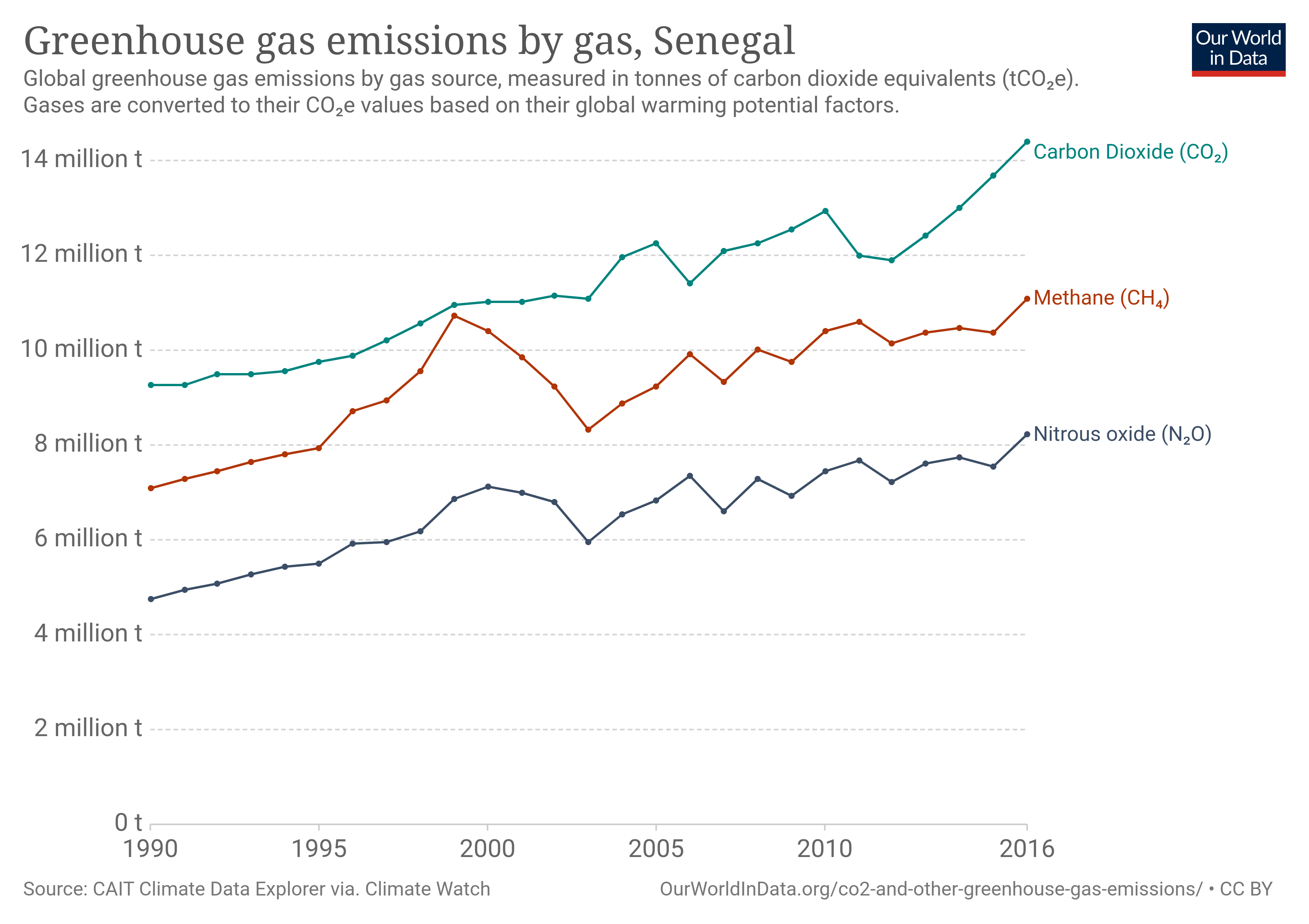
Senegal Greenhouse gas emission from 1990–2016

Senegal is currently not a major contributor to global greenhouse gas emissions. The country contributes less than a ton of CO_{2} per person per year (compared to the global average of over 6 tons per person per year) and placing 150th in the list of countries by CO_{2} emissions. However, it is one of the most vulnerable countries to climate change.

=== Energy consumption ===
Most energy in Senegal is produced from fossil fuels, predominantly diesel and gas. A small portion of Senegal's energy comes from renewable energy, such as the Manantali Dam in Mali and a new wind farm in Thiès.

=== Fossil fuel production ===
Historically, Senegal was not a major producer of fossil fuels but significant discoveries in natural gas, have led to a major increase in production.

== Impacts on the natural environment ==
=== Temperature and weather changes ===
Köppen climate classification map for Senegal for 1980–2016

2071–2100 map under the most intense climate change scenario. Mid-range scenarios are currently considered more likely

West Africa is expected to be affected by climate change caused by rising temperatures, decreased rainfall, increased mega-storms and rising sea levels. Average temperatures over west Africa are projected to increase by between 1.5 and 4 °C (34.7 and 39.2 °F) by mid-century, relative to 1986–2005. Projections of rainfall indicate an overall decrease in rainfall and an increase in intense mega-storm events over the Sahel.

=== Sea level rise ===
The sea level is expected to rise faster in West Africa then the global average.

=== Water resources ===
The main water resources in Senegal are dependent on rainfall. Rainfall deficits and increased variability due to climate change will likely reduce aquifer recharge rates. Major population centers are already realizing saltwater intrusion into aquifers and arable land. Sea level rise and decreased rainfall will exacerbate salinity issues. As more saltwater intrusion happens, this will threaten fish stock in the country.

=== Ecosystems ===
The combination of increased temperatures and decreased rainfall will likely increase desertification in eastern Senegal, leading to expansion of the Sahara.

== Impacts on people ==
=== Economic impacts ===
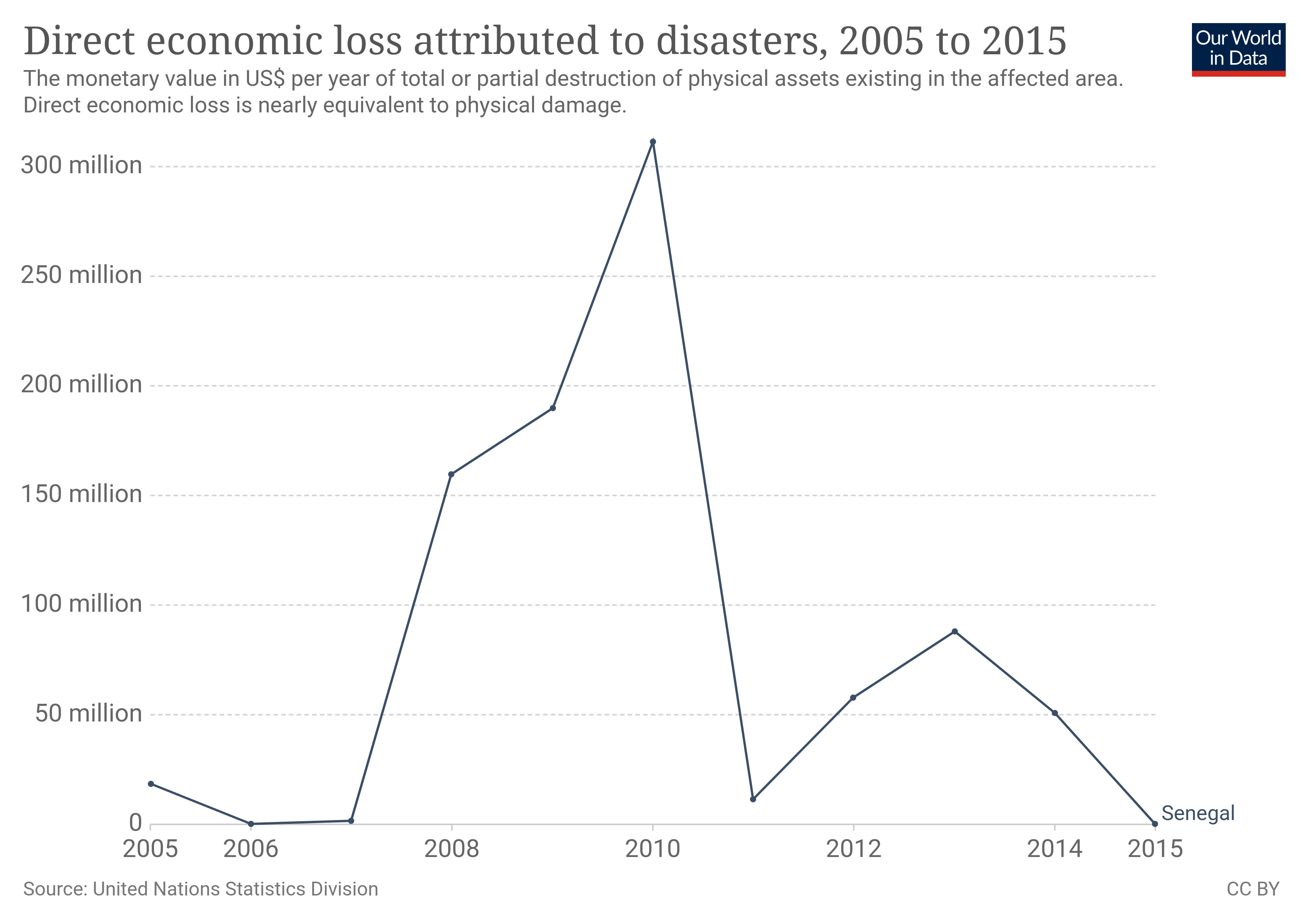
Direct economic loss attribute to disasters in Senegal

==== Agriculture ====
Like in other parts of West Africa, the expected extreme weather including more severe drought in the Sahel region is expected to greatly effect food security and agricultural yields.

Climate change is likely to result in reduced yields of key crops, including sorghum and millet, placing pressure on rural livelihoods since agriculture employs about 70% of the population of Senegal. For example, some projections suggest that between 2000 - 2009 there was a 10 -20% reduction in millet and a 5 - 15% reduction in sorghum yields due to climate change. Climate change adaptation for millet and sorghum include options such as increasing crop tolerances to high temperatures during the flowering period and increasing cultivars' thermal time requirement.

Moreover, animal herding communities, which include about 2.5 million people in the broader Sahel region, will be severally impacted, because weather variability will lead to increased overgrazing, pressure on water supplies, and subsequent effects on the economic viability of herding communities. For example, in 2017, pressures on lands led to increased demand for manufactured animal feed, causing prices to skyrocket and farmers to sell large portions of their herds.

=== Impacts on housing ===
Sea level rise is expected to displace a large percentage of Senegal's population. Nearly 70% of the population lives in coastal zones. The government is already moving communities in high-risk flood areas. Additionally nearly 90% of industry in Senegal is in that same coastal region. Extreme weather events and coastal flooding could jeopardize these major economic centers.

== Mitigation and adaptation ==
=== Policies and legislation ===
In 2006, Senegal initiated a National Adaptation Programme of Action (NAPA) as part of the larger trend to create National Adaptation Plans. A National Committee on Climate Change was appointed by presidential degree to support the program. Additionally, there is a Climate Fund that is an instrument of climate finance.

=== International cooperation ===
In 2015, Senegal released its Nationally Determined Contributions (NDC's) that indicated climate change would be treated as a national priority.

=== Finance ===
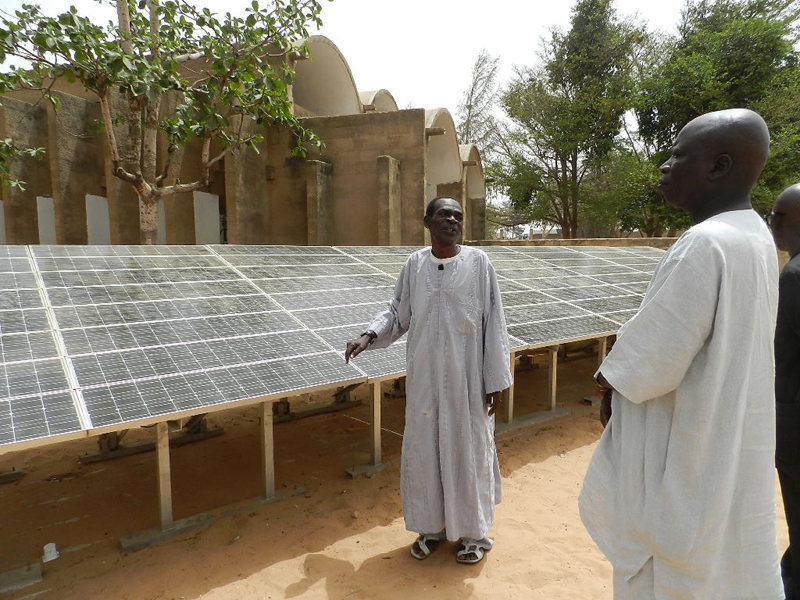
Solar panels in Dakar.

Climate finance in Senegal encompasses public and private resources aimed at addressing the challenges posed by a highly variable climate and significant socioeconomic vulnerabilities. The country, located in the tropical – Sahelian transition zone, experiences dry and rainy cycles controlled by the seasonal migration of the intertropical convergence zone and the trade winds. This pattern has become increasingly unpredictable, with prolonged droughts and extreme rainfall becoming more frequent, impacting rain fed agriculture —which accounts for a significant portion of the rural economy—and generating devastating floods.

The Senegalese energy sector remains heavily dependent on fossil fuels, while renewable sources (solar, wind, and hydro) reached 36–40% overall. Although per capita emissions are relatively low, this exceeds the average for many sub-Saharan African countries. The electrification rate reached 84% in 2023, with urban coverage of 97% and rural coverage of 64%. Senegal faces the challenge of mobilizing domestic and external resources to meet ambitious climate targets and promote climate-resilient development.

== Society and culture ==
=== Activism ===
At the same time that these policies are in place, there is evidence that they are not fully being acted on. For example, an article in The Nation focused on climate justice described how a coal fire power plan was built in Bargny, Senegal, a site that had been identified by the government as a displacement location for communities displaced by sea level rise.
