= Outline of Senegal =

Overview of and topical guide to Senegal

The Flag of Senegal

The Coat of arms of Senegal

The location of Senegal

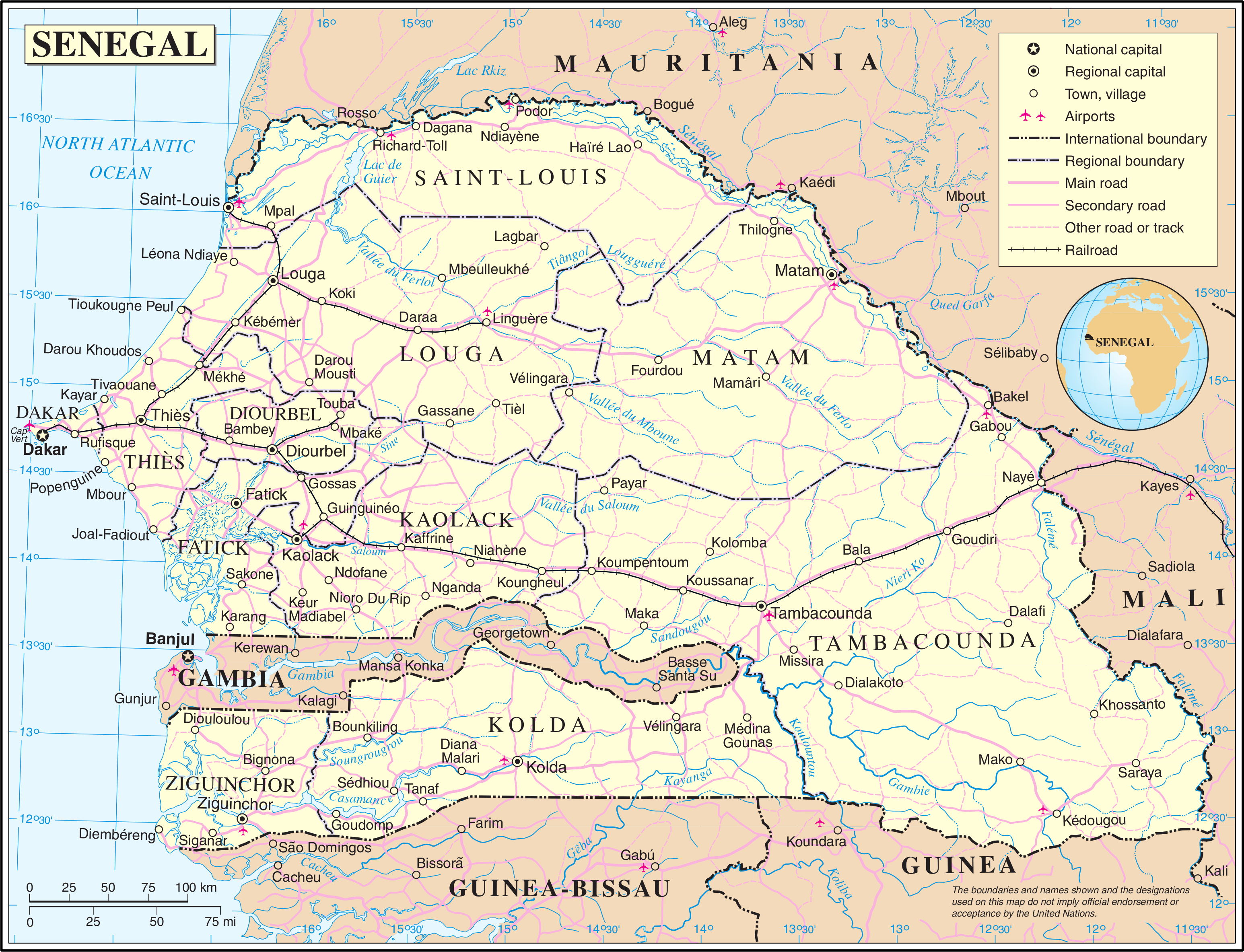
An enlargeable map of the Republic of Senegal

The following outline is provided as an overview of and topical guide to Senegal:

Senegal – sovereign country located south of the Sénégal River in West Africa. Senegal is bound by the Atlantic Ocean to the west, Mauritania to the north, Mali to the east, and Guinea and Guinea-Bissau to the south. The Gambia lies almost entirely within Senegal, surrounded on the north, east and south; from its western coast, Gambia's territory follows the Gambia River more than 300 kilometres (190 mi) inland. Dakar is the capital city of Senegal, located on the Cape Verde Peninsula on the country's Atlantic coast.

== General reference ==
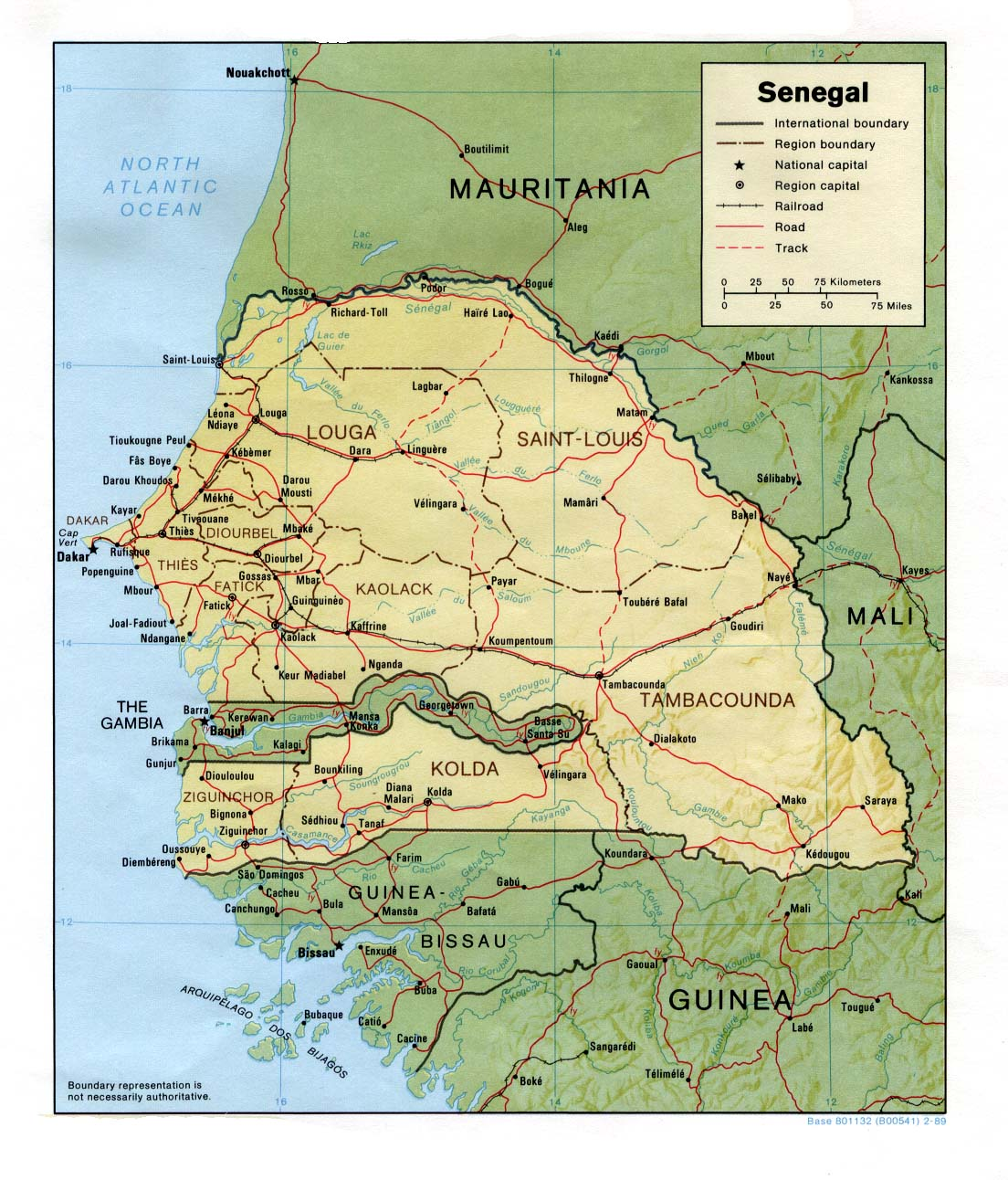
An enlargeable relief map of Senegal

- Pronunciation: /ˌsɛnɪˈɡɔːl, -ˈɡɑːl/
- Common English country name: Senegal
- Official English country name: The Republic of Senegal
- Common endonym: Senegal
- Official endonym: République du Senegal
- Adjectival(s): Senegalese
- Demonym(s): Senegalese
- International rankings of Senegal
- ISO country codes: SN, SEN, 686
- ISO region codes: See ISO 3166-2:SN
- Internet country code top-level domain: .sn

== Geography of Senegal ==
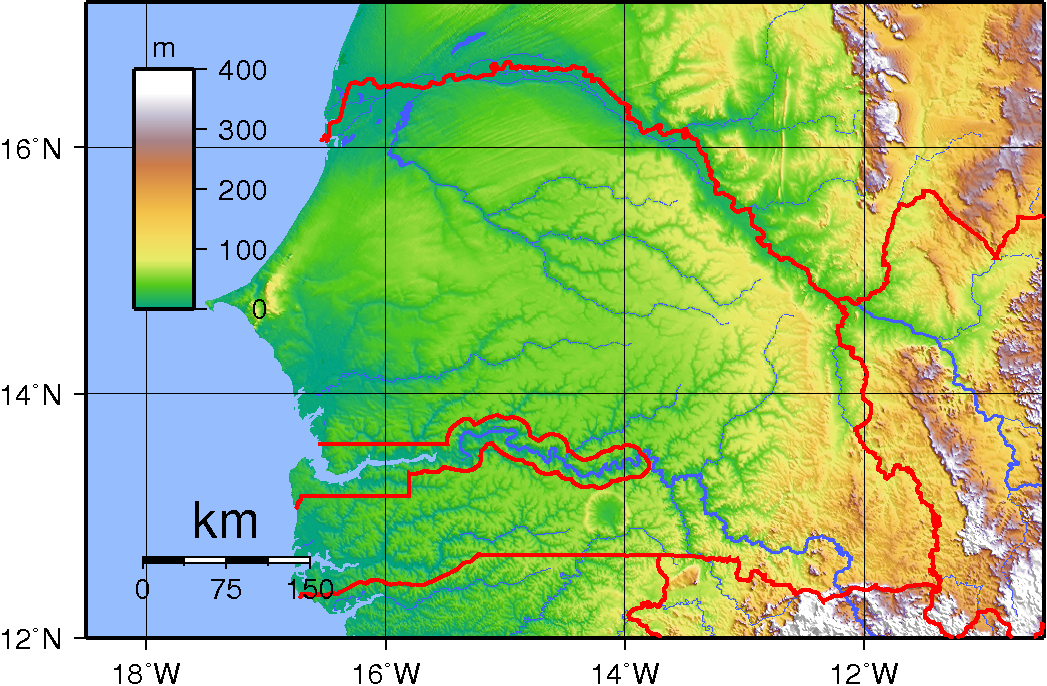
An enlargeable topographic map of Senegal

- Senegal is: a country
- Population of Senegal: 12,379,000 - 68th most populous country
- Area of Senegal: 196,723 km^{2}
- Atlas of Senegal

=== Location ===
- Senegal is situated within the following regions:
  - Northern Hemisphere and Western Hemisphere
  - Africa
    - West Africa
- Time zone: Coordinated Universal Time UTC+00
- Extreme points of Senegal
  - High: unnamed feature 2.7 km southeast of Nepen Diakha 648 m (2,126 ft)
  - Low: North Atlantic Ocean 0 m
- Land boundaries: 2,640 km

Mauritania 813 km
The Gambia 740 km
Mali 419 km
Guinea-Bissau 338 km
Guinea 330 km

- Coastline: North Atlantic Ocean 531 km

=== Environment of Senegal ===
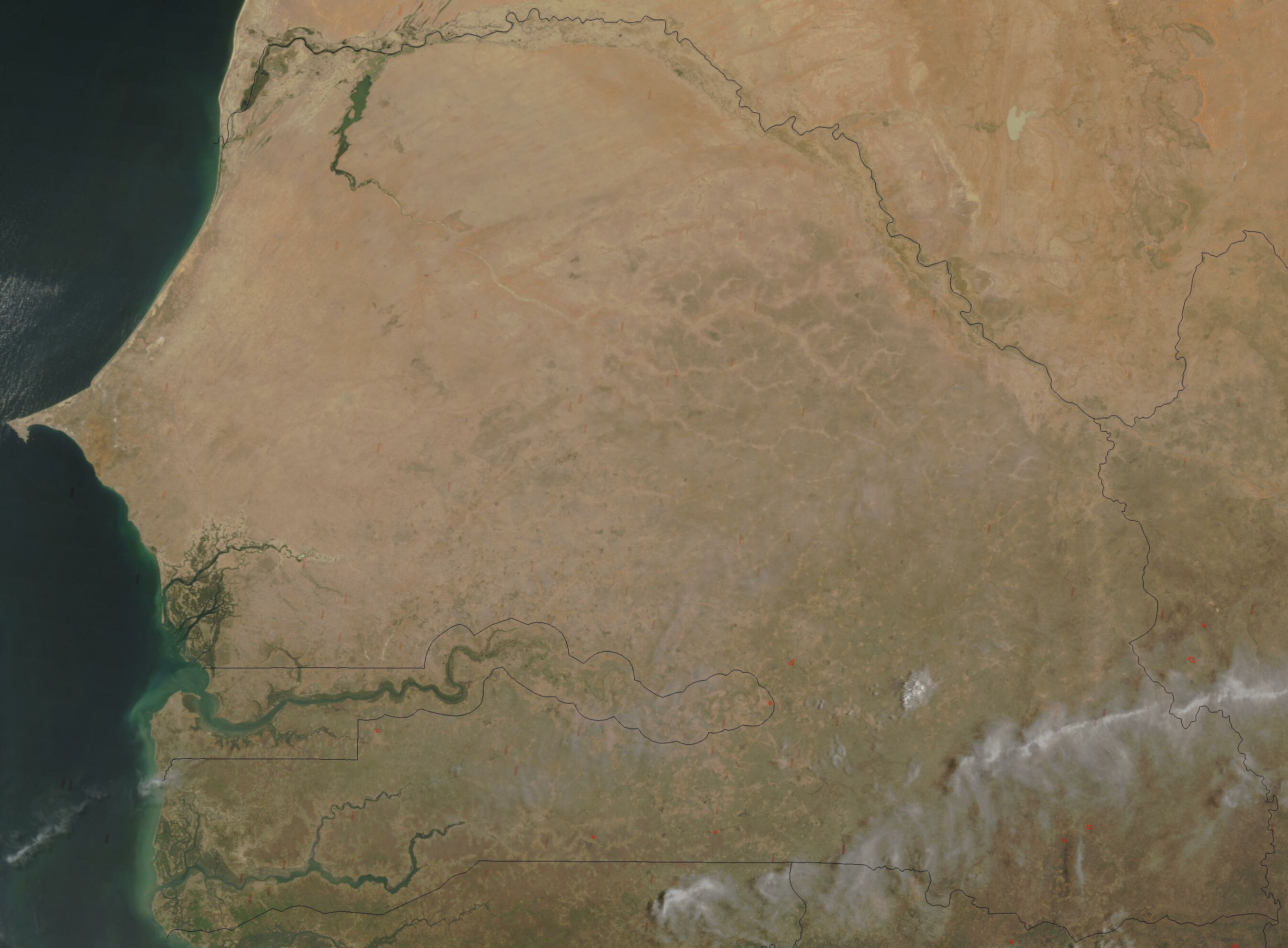
An enlargeable satellite image of Senegal

- Climate of Senegal
- Ecological Monitoring Centre, Senegal
- Protected areas of Senegal
  - Biosphere reserves in Senegal
  - National parks of Senegal
- Wildlife of Senegal
  - Fauna of Senegal
    - Birds of Senegal
    - Mammals of Senegal

==== Natural geographic features of Senegal ====
- Glaciers in Senegal: none
- Islands of Senegal
- Rivers of Senegal
- World Heritage Sites in Senegal

=== Regions of Senegal ===
==== Ecoregions of Senegal ====
List of ecoregions in Senegal

==== Administrative divisions of Senegal ====
Administrative divisions of Senegal

- Regions of Senegal
  - Departments of Senegal
    - Arrondissements of Senegal

Demography of Senegal

Demographics of Senegal

== Government and politics of Senegal ==
Politics of Senegal

- Form of government: semi-presidential, liberal democratic republic
- Capital of Senegal: Dakar
- Elections in Senegal
- Political parties in Senegal

=== Branches of the government of Senegal ===
Government of Senegal

==== Executive branch of the government of Senegal ====
- Head of state: President of Senegal, Bassirou Diomaye Faye
- Head of government: Prime Minister of Senegal, Ousmane Sonko

==== Legislative branch of the government of Senegal ====
- Parliament of Senegal (bicameral)
  - Upper house: Senate of Senegal
  - Lower house: House of Commons of Senegal

==== Judicial branch of the government of Senegal ====
Court system of Senegal

=== Foreign relations of Senegal ===
Foreign relations of Senegal

- Diplomatic missions in Senegal
- Diplomatic missions of Senegal

==== International organization membership ====
The Republic of Senegal is a member of:

- African, Caribbean, and Pacific Group of States (ACP)
- African Development Bank Group (AfDB)
- African Union (AU)
- African Union/United Nations Hybrid operation in Darfur (UNAMID)
- Community of Portuguese Language Countries (CPLP) (associate)
- Conference des Ministres des Finances des Pays de la Zone Franc (FZ)
- Economic Community of West African States (ECOWAS)
- Food and Agriculture Organization (FAO)
- Group of 15 (G15)
- Group of 77 (G77)
- International Atomic Energy Agency (IAEA)
- International Bank for Reconstruction and Development (IBRD)
- International Chamber of Commerce (ICC)
- International Civil Aviation Organization (ICAO)
- International Criminal Court (ICCt)
- International Criminal Police Organization (Interpol)
- International Development Association (IDA)
- International Federation of Red Cross and Red Crescent Societies (IFRCS)
- International Finance Corporation (IFC)
- International Fund for Agricultural Development (IFAD)
- International Labour Organization (ILO)
- International Maritime Organization (IMO)
- International Mobile Satellite Organization (IMSO)
- International Monetary Fund (IMF)
- International Olympic Committee (IOC)
- International Organization for Migration (IOM)
- International Organization for Standardization (ISO) (correspondent)
- International Red Cross and Red Crescent Movement (ICRM)
- International Telecommunication Union (ITU)
- International Telecommunications Satellite Organization (ITSO)
- International Trade Union Confederation (ITUC)
- Inter-Parliamentary Union (IPU)
- Islamic Development Bank (IDB)
- Multilateral Investment Guarantee Agency (MIGA)
- Nonaligned Movement (NAM)
- Organisation internationale de la Francophonie (OIF)
- Organisation of Islamic Cooperation (OIC)
- Organisation for the Prohibition of Chemical Weapons (OPCW)
- Permanent Court of Arbitration (PCA)
- Union Latine
- United Nations (UN)
- United Nations Conference on Trade and Development (UNCTAD)
- United Nations Educational, Scientific, and Cultural Organization (UNESCO)
- United Nations Industrial Development Organization (UNIDO)
- United Nations Mission in Liberia (UNMIL)
- United Nations Mission in the Central African Republic and Chad (MINURCAT)
- United Nations Operation in Cote d'Ivoire (UNOCI)
- United Nations Organization Mission in the Democratic Republic of the Congo (MONUC)
- Universal Postal Union (UPU)
- West African Development Bank (WADB) (regional)
- West African Economic and Monetary Union (WAEMU)
- World Confederation of Labour (WCL)
- World Customs Organization (WCO)
- World Federation of Trade Unions (WFTU)
- World Health Organization (WHO)
- World Intellectual Property Organization (WIPO)
- World Meteorological Organization (WMO)
- World Tourism Organization (UNWTO)
- World Trade Organization (WTO)

=== Law and order in Senegal ===
Law of Senegal

- Constitution of Senegal
- Human rights in Senegal
  - Abortion in Senegal
  - LGBT rights in Senegal
  - Gender equality in Senegal
  - Capital punishment in Senegal
- Law enforcement in Senegal

=== Military of Senegal ===
Military of Senegal

- Command
  - Commander-in-chief:
- Forces
  - Army of Senegal
  - Air Force of Senegal

=== Local government in Senegal ===
Local government in Senegal

== History of Senegal ==
History of Senegal

- Current events of Senegal
- Serer ancient history
  - Timeline of Serer history
  - Serer history (medieval era to present)

== Culture of Senegal ==
Culture of Senegal

- Cuisine of Senegal
- Languages of Senegal
- Media in Senegal
- National symbols of Senegal
  - Coat of arms of Senegal
  - Flag of Senegal
  - National anthem of Senegal
- Prostitution in Senegal
- Public holidays in Senegal
- Religion in Senegal
  - Buddhism in Senegal
  - Christianity in Senegal
  - Hinduism in Senegal
  - Islam in Senegal
  - Serer religion
- World Heritage Sites in Senegal

=== Art in Senegal ===
- Cinema of Senegal
- Literature of Senegal
- Music of Senegal
- Television in Senegal

=== Sports in Senegal ===
Sports in Senegal

- Football in Senegal
- Senegal at the Olympics

== Economy and infrastructure of Senegal ==
Economy of Senegal

- Economic rank, by nominal GDP (2007): 112th (one hundred and twelfth)
- Agriculture in Senegal
- Communications in Senegal
  - Internet in Senegal
- Companies of Senegal
- Currency of Senegal: Franc
  - ISO 4217: XOF
- Energy in Senegal
- Health care in Senegal
- Mining in Senegal
- Stock Exchange in Senegal: none – Senegal is served by the regional stock exchange Bourse Régionale des Valeurs Mobilières (BRVM) in Abidjan, Cote d'Ivoire.
- Tourism in Senegal
- Transport in Senegal
  - Airports in Senegal
  - Rail transport in Senegal
  - Roads in Senegal
- Water supply and sanitation in Senegal

== Education in Senegal ==
Education in Senegal

== Health in Senegal ==
Health in Senegal

== See also ==
Senegal

- List of international rankings
- List of Senegal-related topics
- Member state of the United Nations
- Outline of Africa
- Outline of geography
