= Autonomous Port of Dakar =

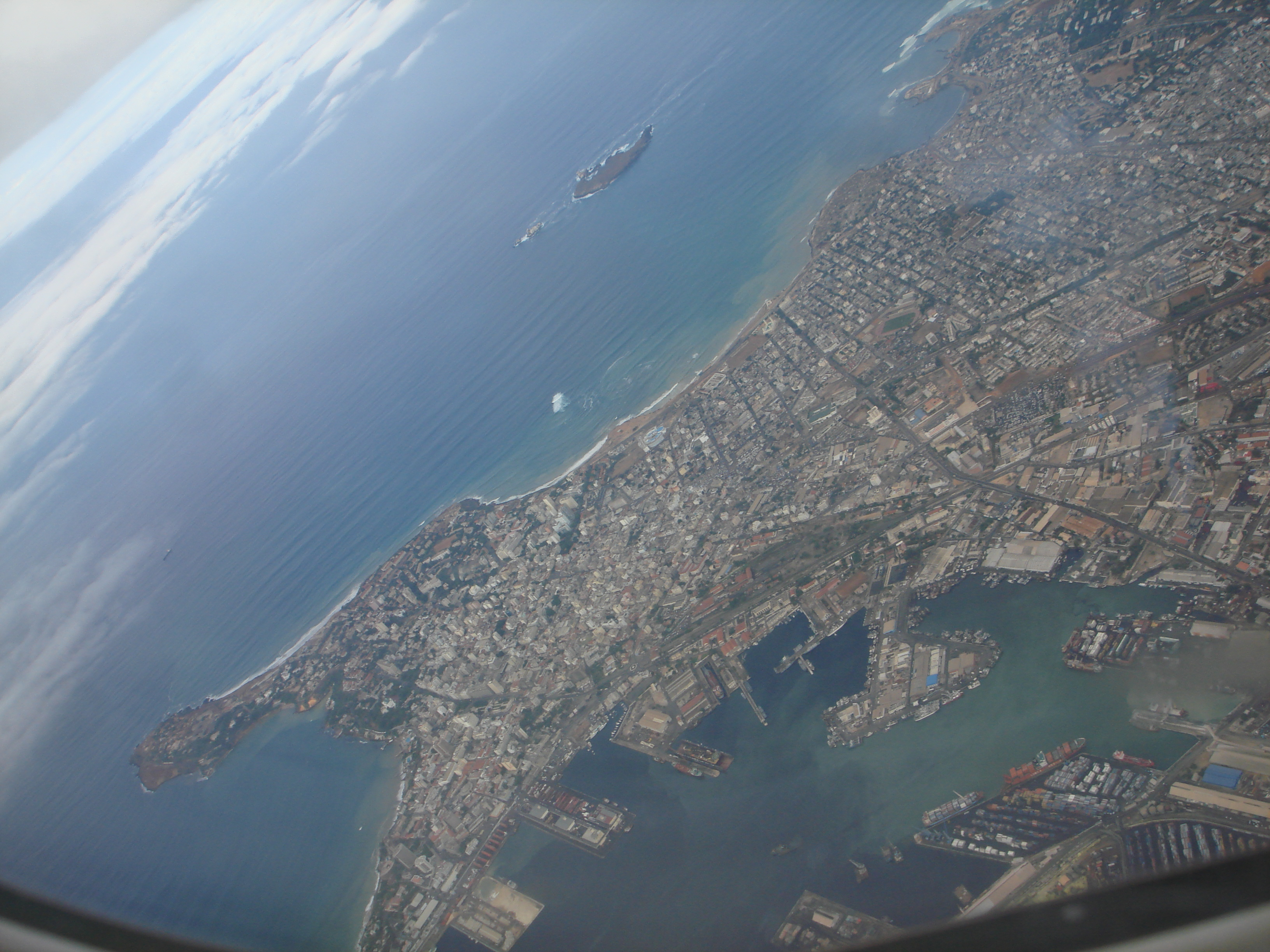
- The port of Dakar in 2007
- Interactive map of Autonomous Port of Dakar

Location
- Location: Dakar, Senegal
- Coordinates: 14.680556°N 17.427778°W

Details
- Opened: 1866
- Owned by: Senegal
- Type of Harbor: Natural/Artificial

Statistics
- Annual cargo tonnage: 9.9 million tonnes (2006)

The Autonomous Port of Dakar (French: Port autonome de Dakar, abbreviation: PAD) is a Senegalese public enterprise which is headquartered in Dakar, located in the east of city. Thanks to the strategic position that gives it a sheltered harbor, it is now the third largest port in West Africa after the Autonomous Port of Abidjan and the Port of Lagos. It is also the ninth-largest port on the African continent.

The port has one of the largest deep-water seaports along the West African coast. Its deep-draft structure and 640-foot-wide (200 m) access channel allows round-the-clock access to the port. Its current infrastructure includes tanker vessel loading and unloading terminals, a container terminal with a storage capacity of 3000 20-foot-equivalent units, a cereals and fishing port, a dedicated phosphate terminal and a privately run ship repair facility. The port's location at the extreme western point of Africa, at the crossroad of the major sea-lanes linking Europe to South America, makes it a natural port of call for shipping companies.

Nearby over 10 km west of the port is Les Mamelles Lighthouse (also the Ouakam Lighthouse) in which the port maintains together with its beacons.

== History ==
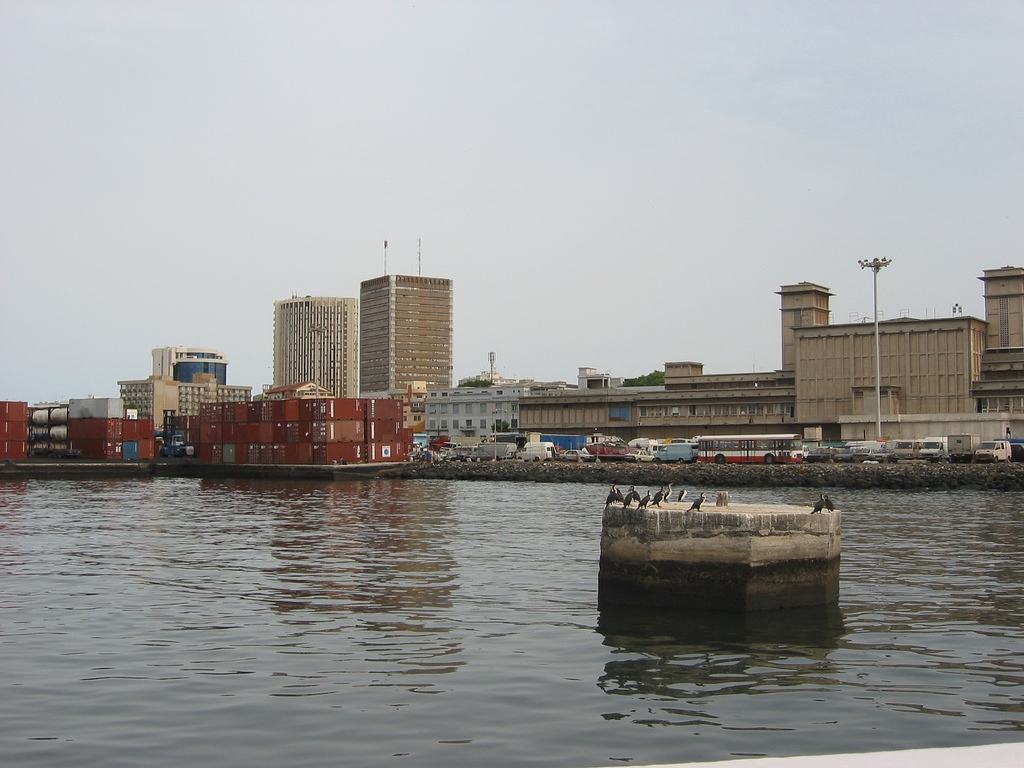
The port of Dakar in 2004

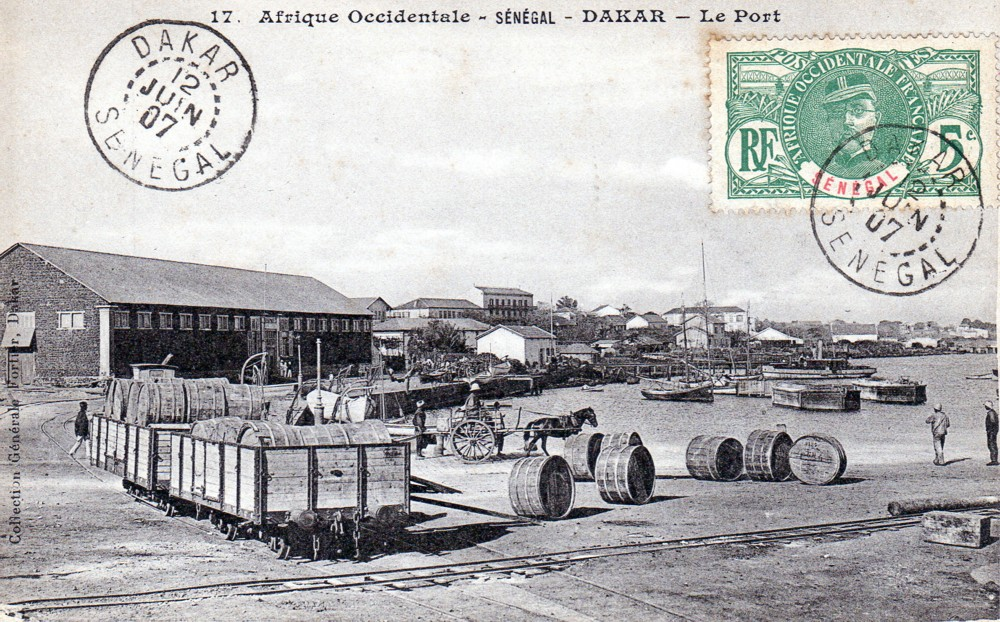
The port, c. 1905

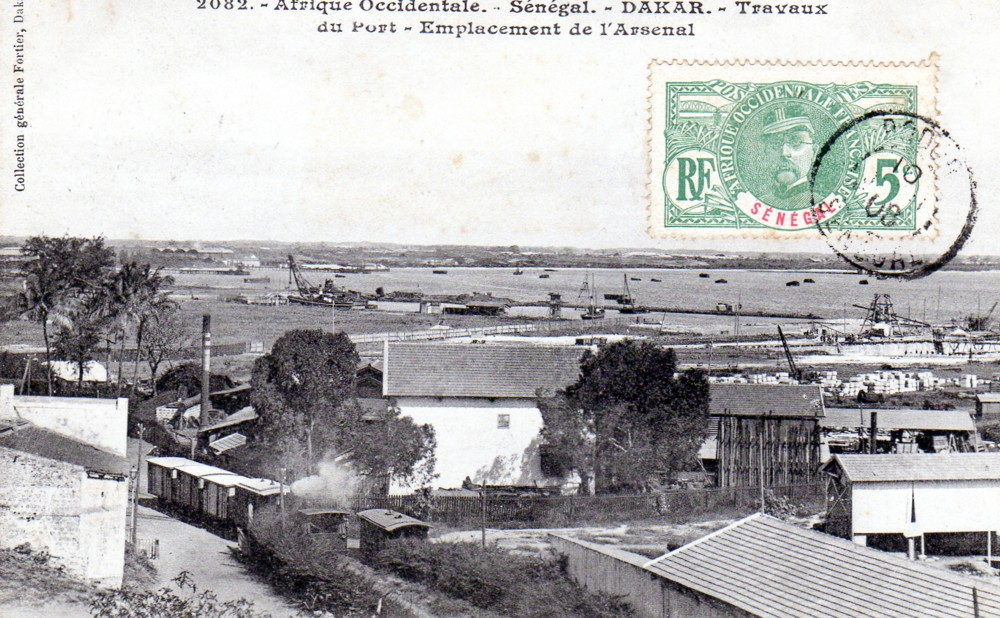
The port in 1908

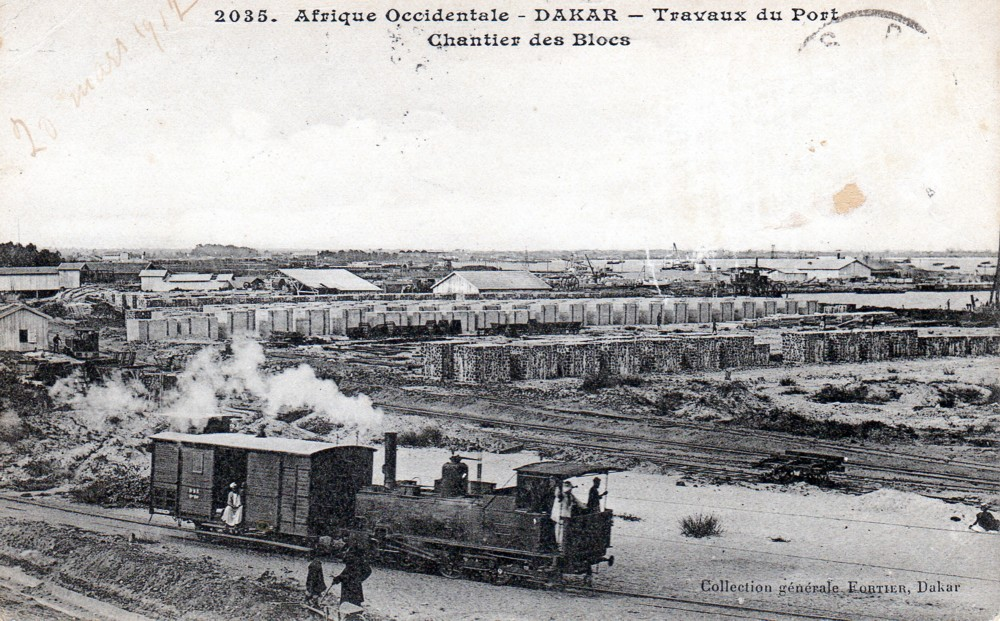
T n° 2 manoeuvreing at the port in 1910

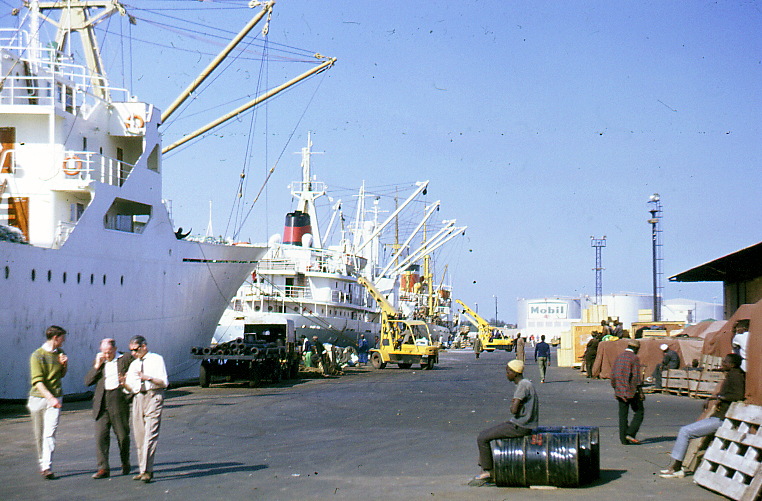
By the quays in 1967

Led by Captain Protet, French troops took possession of the Senegalese coast in 1857. Work began on the port in 1862 and it was inaugurated in 1866.

In the late 1880s up to the Great Depression in the early 1930s (thought did not fully affected inland in Senegal), its ship traffic volume was high, it was used as a refueling station for ships with coal, especially military ones, up to the start of the 20th century, most of the ships were French, other ships came there. Ship volume was always higher than the port of Mindelo (see also Porto Grande Bay) in Portuguese Cape Verde, the closest other major port at the time and was nearly active with the port of Las Palmas de Gran Canaria. Coal refueling dropped when diesel ships rose and by the late 1950s, all ships would be refueled with diesel.

While the Bolloré Group was in Senegal for more than 80 years, Dubai Ports World (DP World), who on October 8, 2007 signed an agreement with Senegalese Prime Minister Cheikh Hadjibou Soumaré for a 25-year concession on the container terminal of the port, marking a new breakthrough business in the Gulf States in Francophone Africa, ahead of the 11th summit of the Organization of the Islamic Cooperation in Dakar in March 2008.

Plans for new infrastructure - modernization of the site and the "future of the port", as stated by President Abdoulaye Wade - are scheduled for delivery by 2012.

== Activity ==
Total freight traffic averages 10 million metric tons.

In 2006, the port's shipping traffic carried 9.9 million tons of goods.

== Port operation ==
Port handling charges - comparative costs at Dakar, Banjul and Bissau
	Banjul	Dakar	Bissau
Days in port	14	12	16
Total cost (USD)	119,387	71,094	96,162

Source: World Bank; African Development Bank study on the transport sector

== Port of Ndayane ==
To relieve congestion at the existing port, the Autonomous Port of Dakar and the Dubai-based operator DP World are developing a new deep-water port at Ndayane, about 50 kilometres south of Dakar. Following two 25-year concession agreements signed with the Senegalese government in 2020, construction began in 2022 in what DP World describes as its largest investment in Africa and the biggest single private investment in Senegal's history, for a total cost of about US$1.1 billion. The first phase, costing some US$837 million, comprises an 840-metre container quay and a 5-kilometre marine channel able to accommodate 366-metre vessels, adding about 1.2 million TEU of annual capacity; a second phase is to add a further 410-metre quay. An adjacent economic and industrial zone is also planned near Blaise Diagne International Airport.

== Other ==
The football (soccer) club ASC Port Autonome is named after port and the port co-owns the club.

The port features prominently in Senegalese cult-classic film Touki Bouki.

== See also ==
- Transport in Senegal
- MV Le Joola
- List of Senegalese companies

== Map ==
- Côte occidentale d'Afrique. Port et Mouillage de Dakar. Levés en 1875 ... par Mr F. Leclerc (Coast of West Africa), Paris, 1876 (carte conserved in the British Library)
