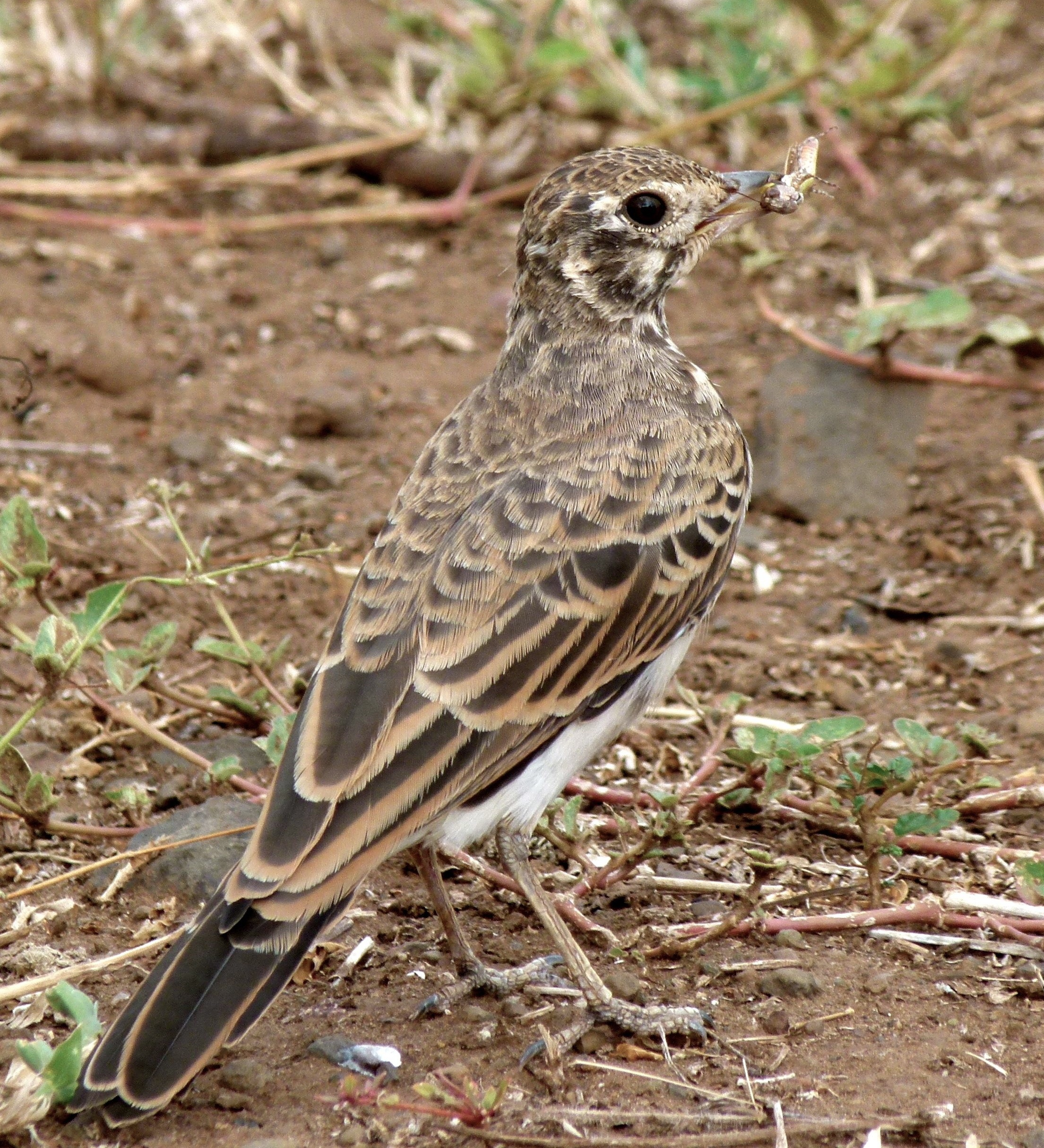
- In Kruger NP, South Africa

Conservation status
- Least Concern (IUCN 3.1)

Scientific classification
- Kingdom: Animalia
- Phylum: Chordata
- Class: Aves
- Order: Passeriformes
- Family: Alaudidae
- Genus: Pinarocorys
- Species: P. nigricans

Binomial name
- Pinarocorys nigricans (Sundevall, 1850)

Subspecies
- See text
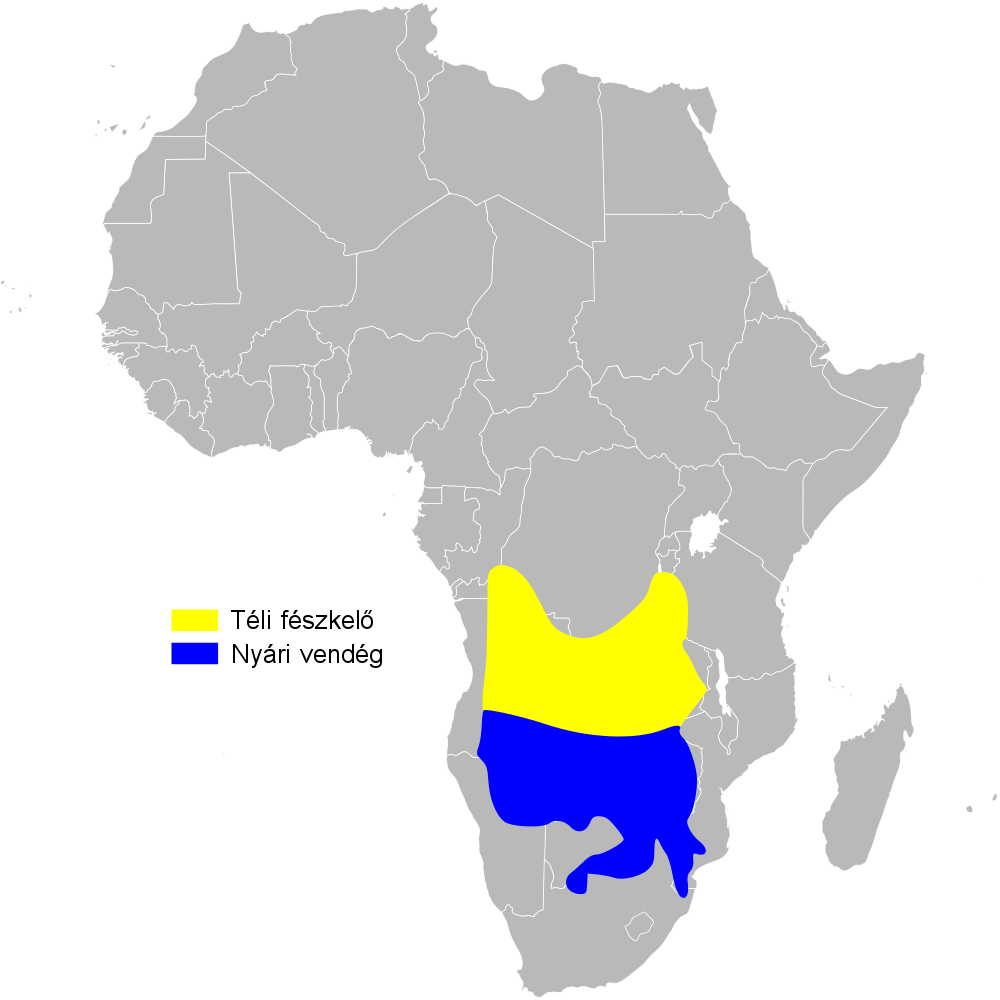
- breeding range in blue, overwintering range in yellow

Synonyms
- Alauda nigricans; Mirafra nigricans

= Dusky lark =

Species of bird

The dusky lark (Pinarocorys nigricans), also known as the dusky bush lark or rufous-rumped bush lark, is a species of migratory lark in the family Alaudidae. It is native to southern Central Africa.

== Range ==
It is found in southern Central Africa; it is a summer migrant to more southerly areas. Its natural habitats are dry savannah and subtropical or tropical dry lowland grassland.

== Taxonomy and systematics ==
Formerly, the dusky lark was classified as belonging to the genera Alauda and Mirafra until moved to Pinarocorys.

=== Subspecies ===
Two subspecies are recognized:

- P. n. nigricans (Sundevall, 1850): Found in south-eastern DR Congo, north-western Zambia and south-western Tanzania
- P. n. occidentis Clancey, 1968: Found in south-western DR Congo and northern Angola
