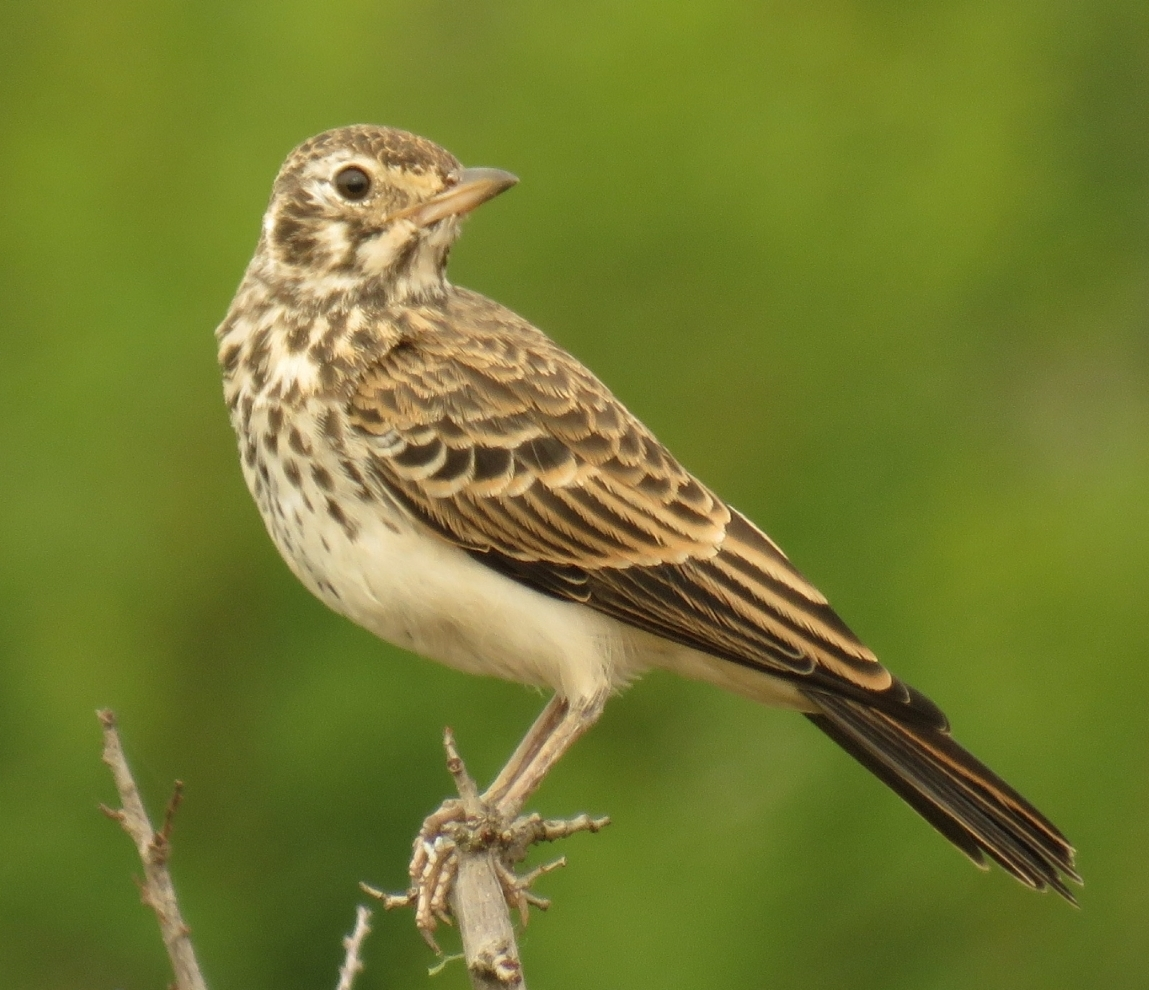
- Dusky lark (Pinarocorys nigricans)

Scientific classification
- Kingdom: Animalia
- Phylum: Chordata
- Class: Aves
- Order: Passeriformes
- Family: Alaudidae
- Genus: Pinarocorys; Shelley, 1902

Type species
- Alauda nigricans Sundevall, 1850

Species
- 2, see text

= Pinarocorys =

Genus of birds

Pinarocorys is a genus of larks in the family Alaudidae.

== Species ==
It contains two species:

Image	Scientific name	Common name	Distribution
	Pinarocorys nigricans	Dusky lark	southern Central Africa
	Pinarocorys erythropygia	Rufous-rumped lark	western and central Africa from Mali, Guinea, and Sierra Leone to eastern Sudan, South Sudan and northwestern Uganda
