= Groupement Aérien Sénégalais =

IATA	ICAO	Call sign
-	-	-
- Hubs: Dakar-Yoff-Léopold Sédar Senghor International Airport
- Fleet size: 2
- Headquarters: Dakar, Senegal

Groupement Aérien Sénégalais is the governmental airline of Senegal based in Dakar. Its main base is Dakar-Yoff-Léopold Sédar Senghor International Airport.

== Fleet ==
=== Current fleet ===
The Groupement Aérien Sénégalais fleet consists of the following aircraft (as of August 2017):

Groupement Aérien Sénégalais fleet
Aircraft	In service	Orders	Passengers	Notes
Airbus A319-100CJ	1	—		
Boeing 727-200RE	1	—		
Total	2	—		

=== Former fleet ===
The Groupement Aérien Sénégalais fleet previously included the following aircraft (as of 11 August 2009):

- 1 Airbus A340-200
