= International rankings of Senegal =

These are the international rankings of Senegal.

== Economy ==
- World Economic Forum 2016-2017 Global Competitiveness Report ranked 112 out of 138

== Society ==
- United Nations Development Programme 2015 Human Development Index ranked 170 out of 188

== Politics ==
- Transparency International 2015 Corruption Perceptions Index ranked 64 out of 168

== Technology ==
- World Intellectual Property Organization: Global Innovation Index 2026 ranked 90 out of 139 countries
