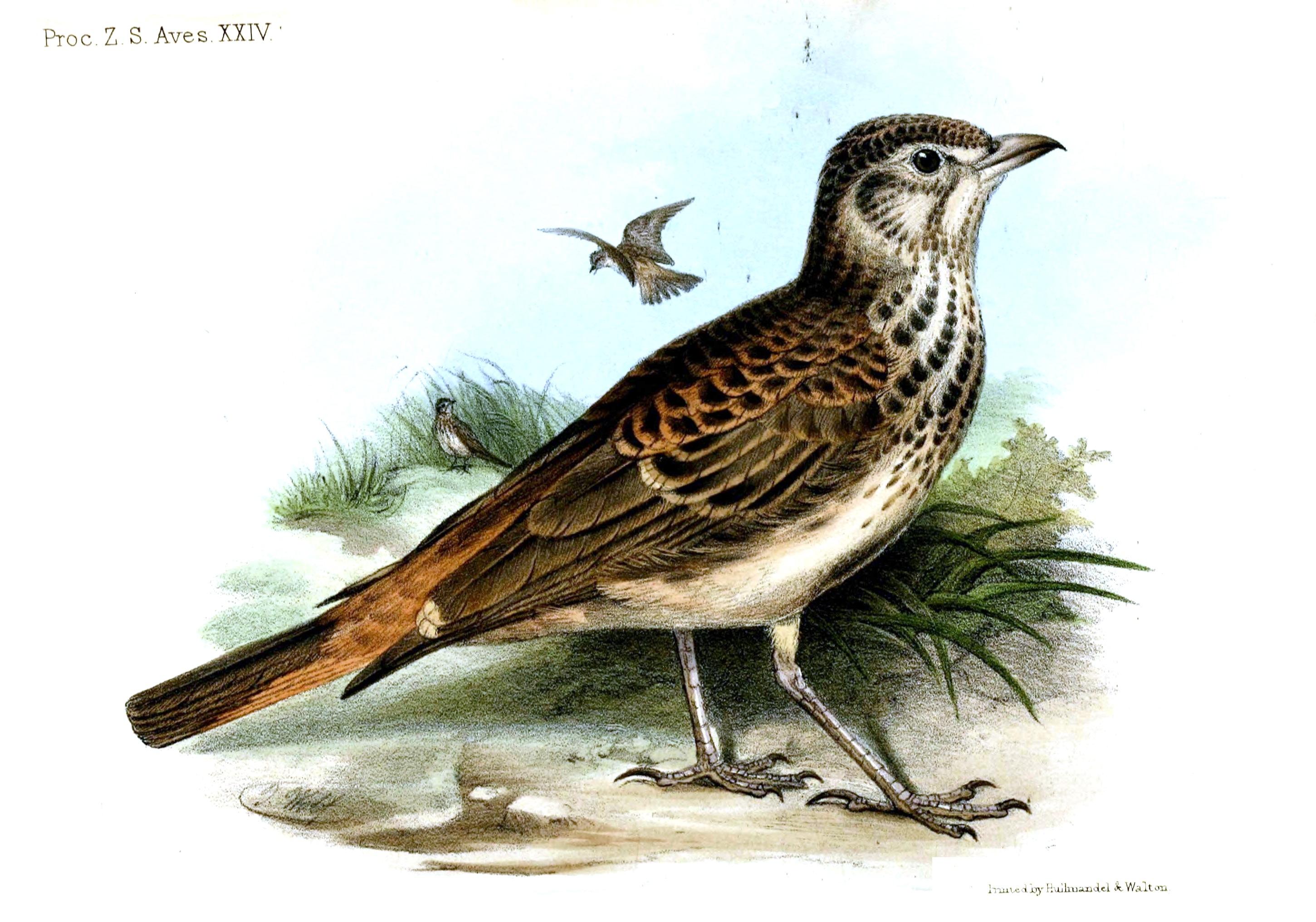

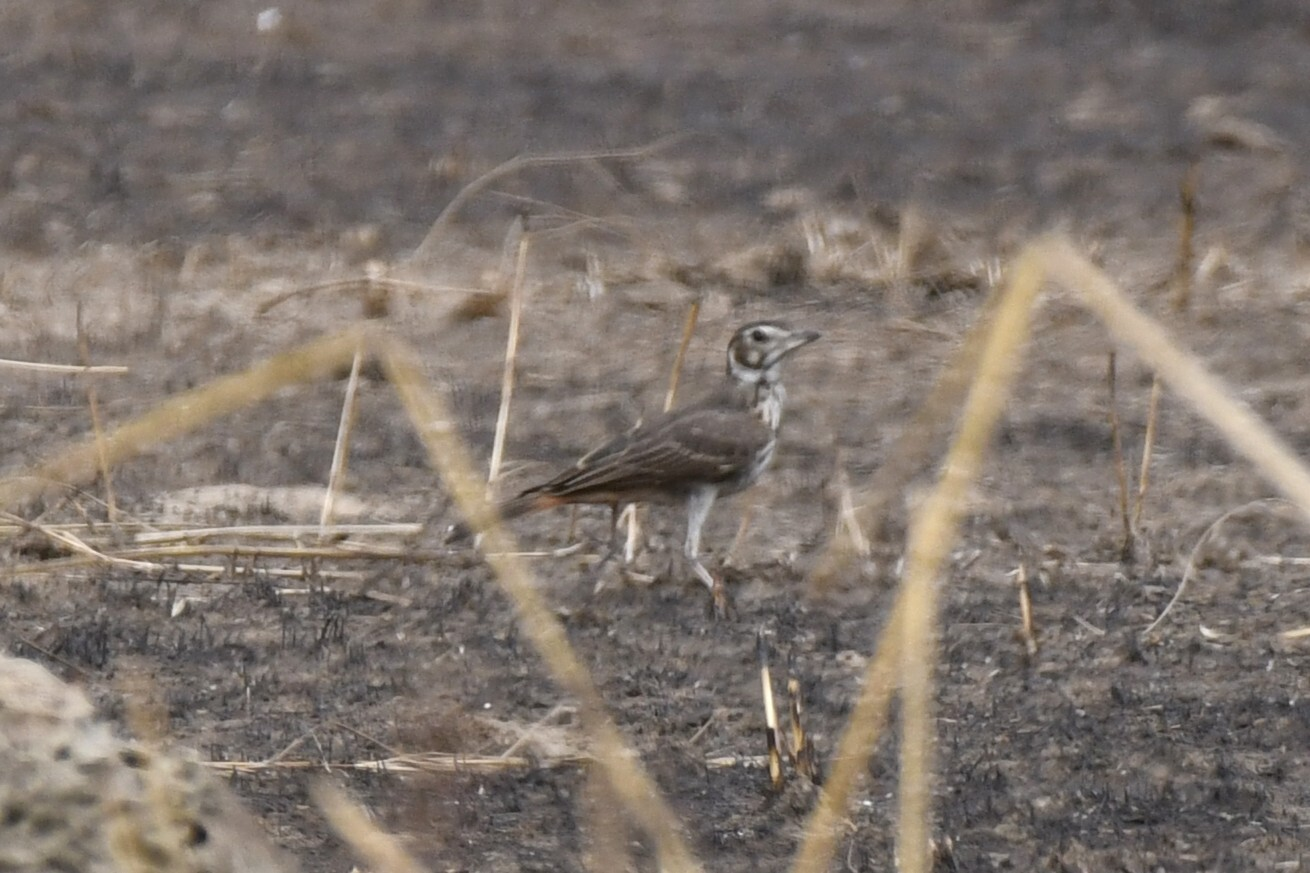

Conservation status
- Least Concern (IUCN 3.1)

Scientific classification
- Kingdom: Animalia
- Phylum: Chordata
- Class: Aves
- Order: Passeriformes
- Family: Alaudidae
- Genus: Pinarocorys
- Species: P. erythropygia

Binomial name
- Pinarocorys erythropygia (Strickland, 1852)
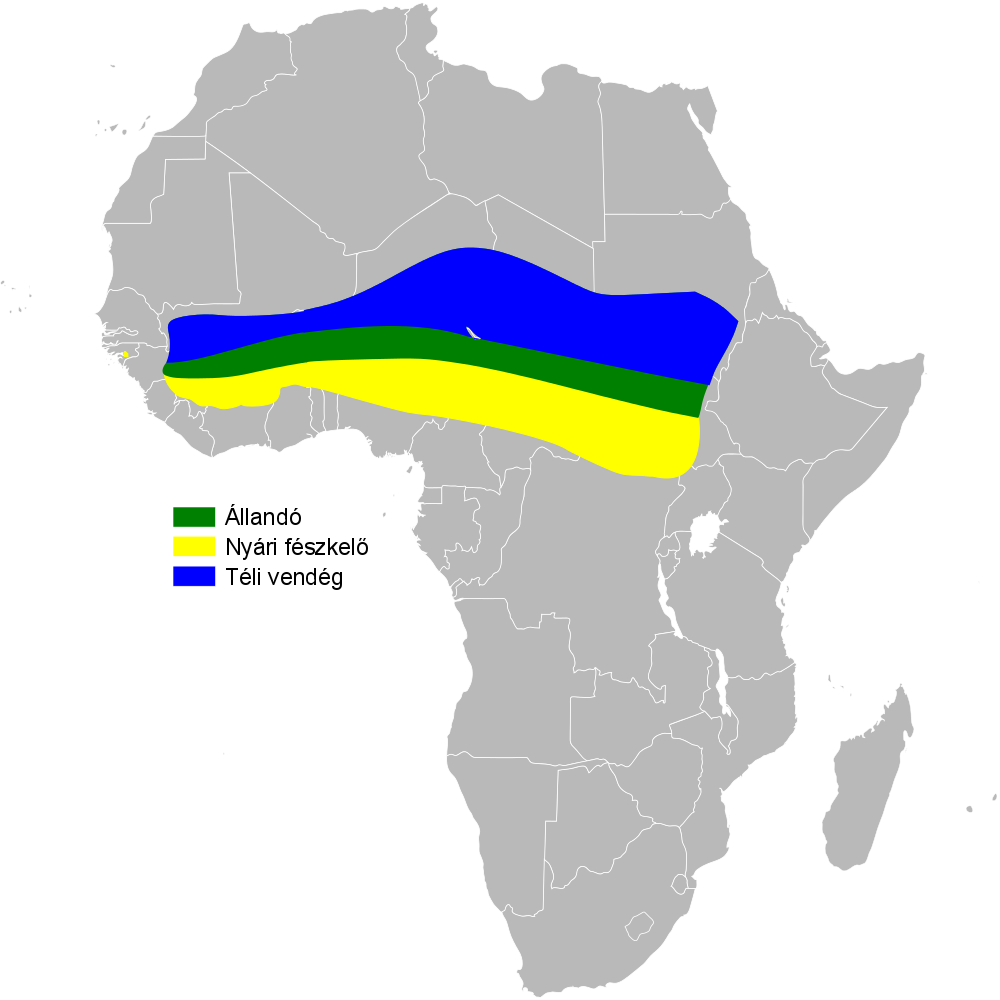

Synonyms
- Alauda erythropygia; Certhilauda erythropygia; Mirafra erythropygia; Mirafra nigricans erythropygia

= Rufous-rumped lark =

Species of bird

The rufous-rumped lark (Pinarocorys erythropygia) is a species of lark in the family Alaudidae. It is found in western and central Africa from Mali, Guinea and Sierra Leone to eastern Sudan, South Sudan and north-western Uganda. Its natural habitat is dry savannah.

Originally, the rufous-rumped lark was classified within the genus Alauda. Later, some authorities considered the rufous-rumped lark to be a species within the genera Certhilauda and Mirafra. Alternate common names include red-rumped lark, red-tailed bush lark and red-tailed lark.
