= List of companies of Senegal =

Location of Senegal

Senegal is a country in West Africa. Senegal is bordered by Mauritania in the north, Mali to the east, Guinea to the southeast, and Guinea-Bissau to the southwest. Senegal also borders The Gambia, a country occupying a narrow sliver of land along the banks of the Gambia river, which separates Senegal's southern region of Casamance from the rest of the country. Senegal also shares a maritime border with Cape Verde. Senegal's economical and political capital is Dakar. It is the westernmost country in the mainland of the Old World, or Afro-Eurasia, and owes its name to the Senegal River, which borders it to the east and north.

The main industries include food processing, mining, cement, artificial fertilizer, chemicals, textiles, refining imported petroleum, and tourism. Exports include fish, chemicals, cotton, fabrics, groundnuts, and calcium phosphate. The principal foreign market is India at 26.7 percent of exports (as of 1998). Other foreign markets include the United States, Italy and the United Kingdom.

== Notable firms ==
This list includes notable companies with primary headquarters located in the country. The industry and sector follow the Industry Classification Benchmark taxonomy. Organizations which have ceased operations are included and noted as defunct.

Notable companies Status: P=Private, S=State; A=Active, D=Defunct
Name	Industry	Sector	Headquarters	Founded	Notes	Status	
Air Sénégal International	Consumer services	Airlines	Dakar	1962	Airline, defunct 2009	P	D
Amsa assurances Sénégal	Financial services	Insurance	Dakar	1977		P	A
Atlantis Airlines	Consumer services	Airlines	Dakar	2001	Airline, defunct 2008	P	D
Dakar–Niger Railway	Industrials	Railroads	Dakar	1924	Railway	P	A
Groupement Aérien Sénégalais	Consumer services	Airlines	Dakar	?	State-owned airline	S	A
Ikatel	Telecommunications	Mobile telecommunications	Dakar	2003	Now part of Orange S.A. (France)	P	A
La Poste	Industrials	Delivery services	Dakar	1962	Postal services	S	A
Senegal Airlines	Consumer services	Airlines	Dakar	2009	Airline, defunct 2016	P	D
Senelec	Utilities	Conventional electricity	Dakar	1983	National electric company	S	A
Sonatel	Telecommunications	Mobile telecommunications	Dakar	1985	Mobile network	P	A

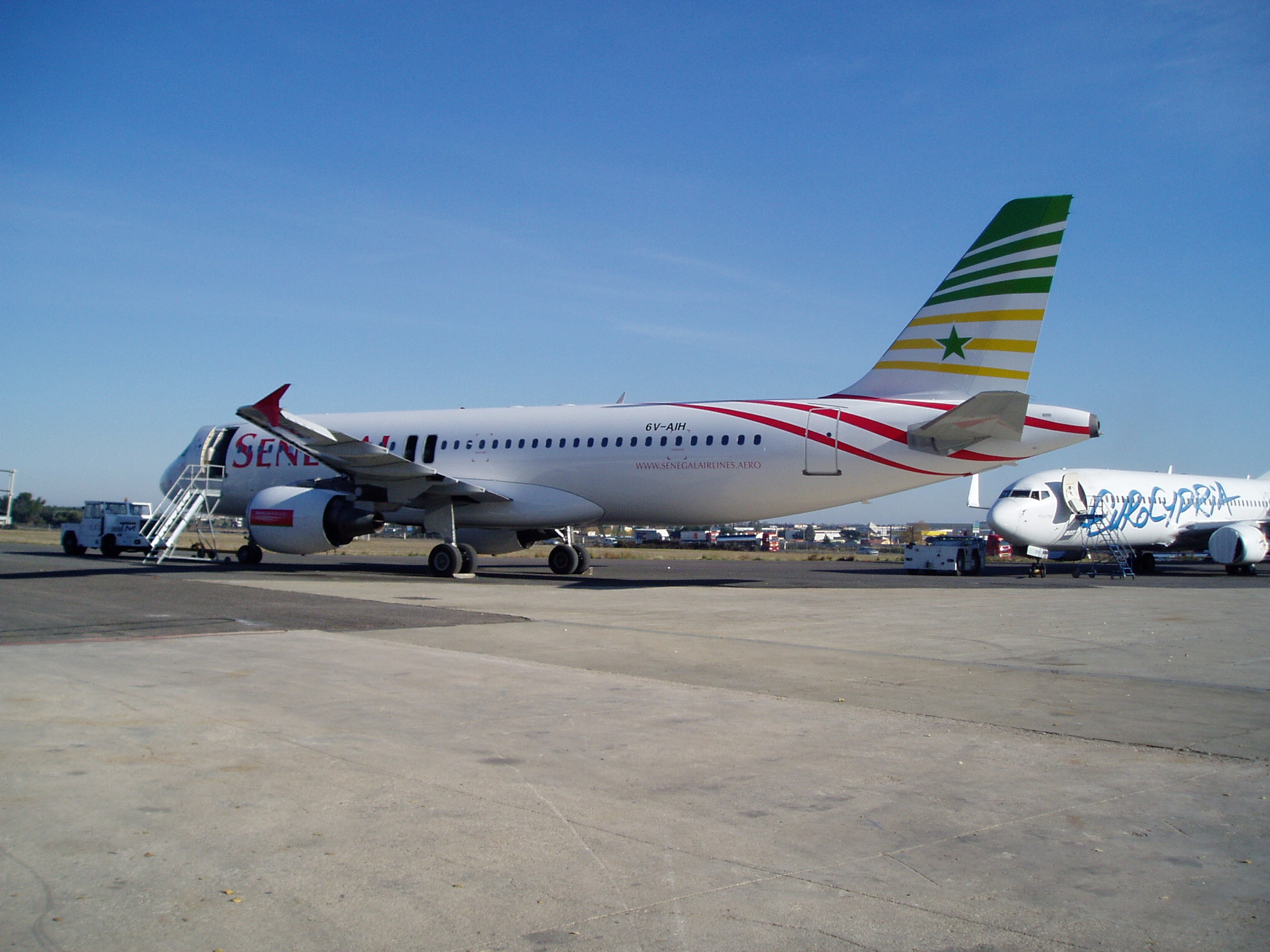
A Senegal Airlines Airbus A320-214 in 2010.

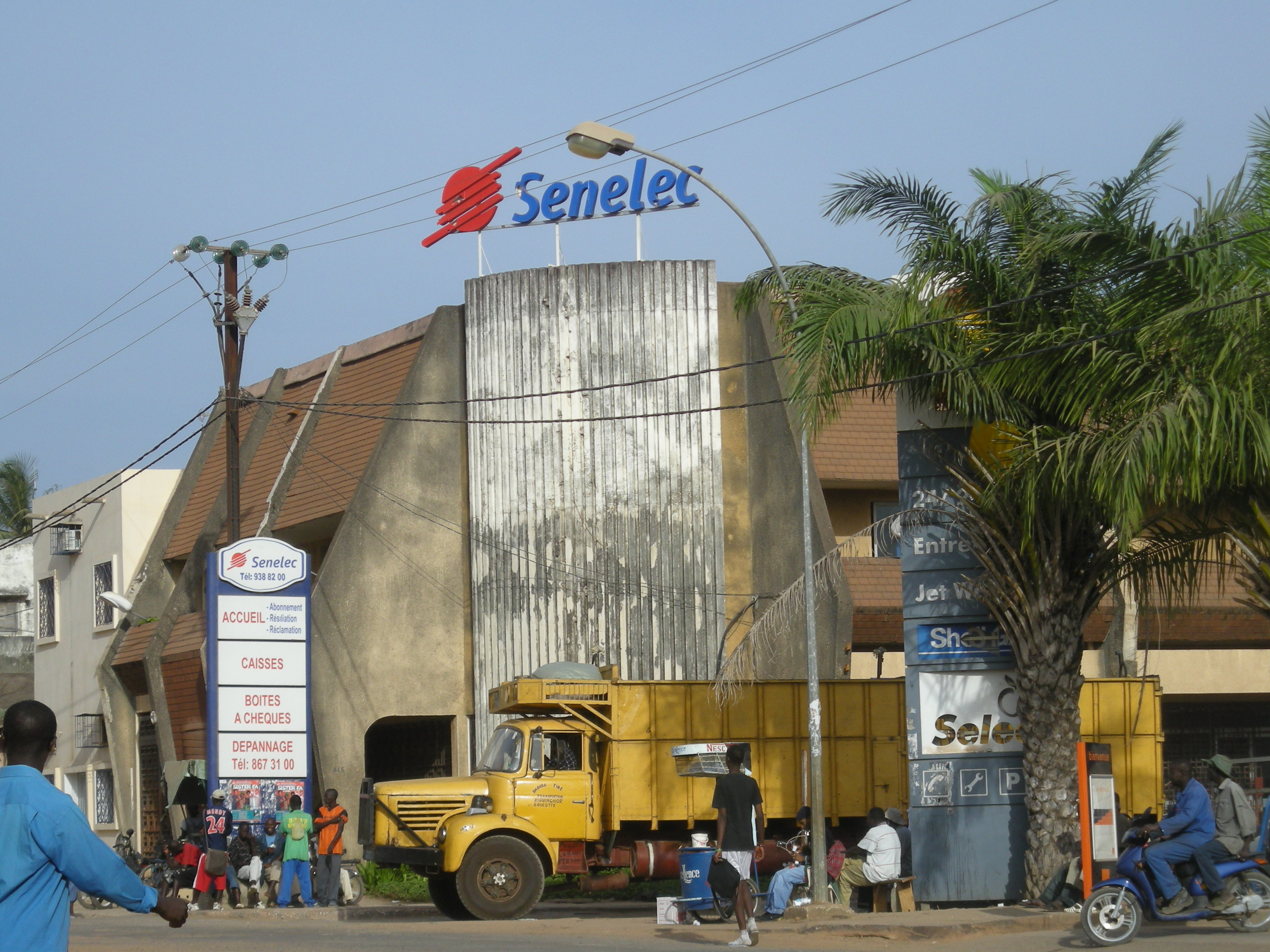
A Senelec agency at Ziguinchor in the Casamance region.
