= Economy of Senegal =

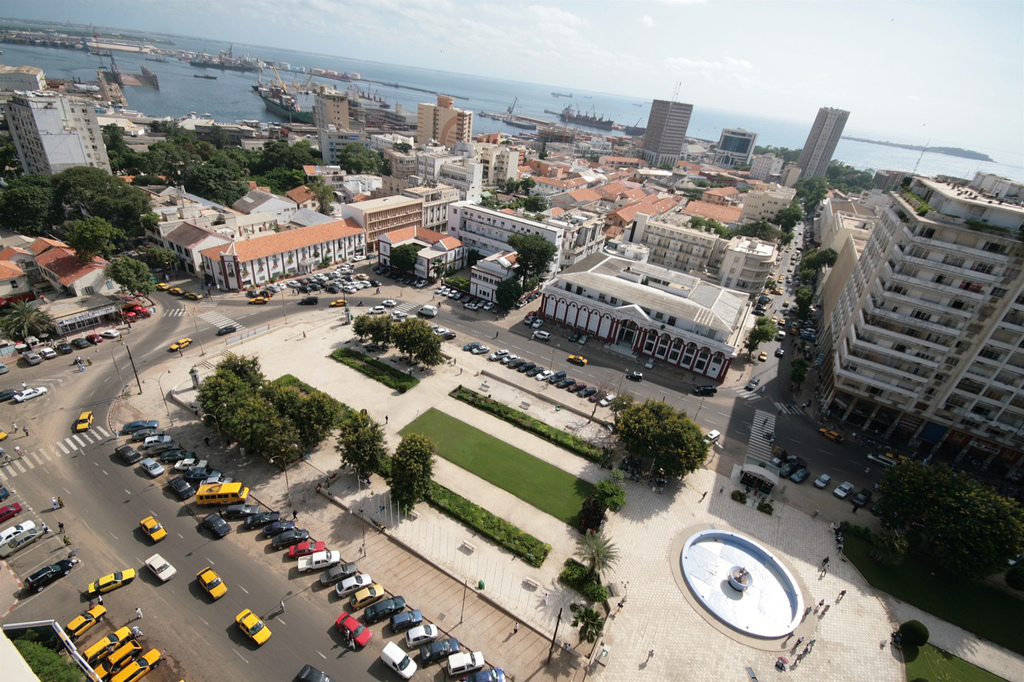
- Dakar, Senegal's place de l'Indépendance: a center of government, banking and trade. In the background is the commercial port and the tourist area, Gorée island.
- Currency: West African CFA franc (XOF)
- Fixed exchange rates: 1 EUR = 655.957 XOF
- Trade organisations: AU, AfCFTA, ECOWAS, CEN-SAD, WTO
- Country group: Least developed; Lower-middle income economy

Statistics
- Population: ▲18,384,660 (2023)
- GDP: ▲$34.73 billion (nominal; 2025); ▲$105.43 billion (PPP; 2025)
- GDP rank: 106th (nominal; 2025); 101st (PPP; 2025)
- GDP growth: 8.4% (2025)
- GDP per capita: ▲$1,810 (nominal; 2025); ▲$5,500 (PPP; 2025)
- GDP per capita rank: 154th (nominal; 2025); 150th (PPP; 2025)
- GDP per capita growth: 4.3% (2025)
- GDP by sector: Agriculture: 15.5%; Industry: 25.4%; Services: 49.1%; (2024 est.)
- Inflation (CPI): 2.0% (2025)
- Population below national poverty line: 46.7% (2011 est.); 67.5% on less than $3.20/day (2011)
- Gini coefficient: 38.1 medium (2018, World Bank)
- Human Development Index: ▲0.530 low (2023) (169th); ▼0.340 low IHDI (2023)
- Corruption Perceptions Index: ▲45 out of 100 points (2024, 69th rank
- Labour force: ▲5,257,332 (2023); 42.4% employment rate (2015)
- Labour force by occupation: agriculture: 77.5%; industry: 22.5%; industry and services: 22.5%; (2007 est.)
- Informal employment: 89.2% (2024)
- Main industries: agricultural and fish processing, phosphate mining, fertilizer production, petroleum refining, zircon, and gold mining, construction materials, ship construction and repair

External
- Exports: ▲$8.1 billion (2024)
- Export goods: gold, refined petroleum, phosphoric acid, fish, cement (2023)
- Main export partners: Mali 21%; India 12%; Switzerland 11%; China 5%; United Arab Emirates 4%; (2023)
- Imports: ▼$14.25 billion (2024)
- Import goods: refined petroleum, crude petroleum, rice, garments, wheat (2023)
- Main import partners: China 19%; France 9%; Nigeria 7%; India 7%; Russia 5%; (2023)
- Current account: ▼ -$6.07 billion (▲19.8% of GDP) (2023)
- Gross external debt: ▲$8.571 billion (31 December 2017 est.)

Public finance
- Government debt: ▲48.3% of GDP (2017 est.)
- Foreign reserves: ▲$1.827 billion (31 December 2017 est.)
- Budget balance: −3.6% (of GDP) (2017 est.)
- Revenue: $7.749 billion (2023 est.)
- Spending: 9.267 billion (2023 est.)
- All values, unless otherwise stated, are in US dollars.

Senegal has a developing economy driven by mining, construction, tourism, fishing and agriculture, which are the main sources of employment in rural areas. Natural resources include iron, zircon, gold, phosphates, and now oil and gas. In the past Senegal's economy gained most of its foreign exchange from fish, phosphates, groundnuts, tourism. One of the historically dominant parts of the economy, agricultural, is highly vulnerable to environmental conditions such as variations in rainfall and climate, and fluctuations in world commodity prices. It is a member of the World Trade Organization.

The capital of Senegal, Dakar, was the former capital of all of French West Africa. As a result, it remains the home to major banks and other institutions which serve all of Francophonic West Africa and is the hub for shipping and transport into and out of the entire region, which benefits landlocked neighboring Mali.

Senegal has one of the most developed tourist industries in Africa. The main obstacles to the economic development of the country are its great corruption with inefficient justice, very slow administrative formalities, and a failing education sector.

== History ==
The GDP per capita of Senegal shrank by 1.30% in the 1960s. However, it registered a peak growth of 158% in the 1970s, and still expanded 43% in the turbulent 1980s. However, this proved unsustainable and the economy consequently shrank by 40% in the 1990s.

Two thirds of Senegalese expect living conditions to improve in the coming decades.

=== IMF and 1990s economic reforms ===
The headquarters of the Central Bank of West African States in Dakar.

Since the January 1994 CFA franc devaluation, the International Monetary Fund (IMF), the World Bank, and other multilateral and creditors have been supporting the Government of Senegal's structural and sectoral adjustment programs. The broad objectives of the program have been to facilitate growth and development by reducing the role of government in the economy, improving public sector management, enhancing incentives for the private sector, and reducing poverty.

In January 1994, Senegal undertook a radical economic reform program at the behest of the international donor community. This reform began with a 50% devaluation of Senegal's currency, the CFA franc, which was linked at a fixed rate to the French franc. Government price controls and subsidies have been steadily dismantled as another economic reform.

This currency devaluation had severe social consequences, because most essential goods were imported. Overnight, the price of goods such as milk, rice, fertilizer and machinery doubled. As a result, Senegal suffered a large exodus, with many of the most educated people and those who could afford it choosing to leave the country.

After an economic contraction of 2.1% in 1993, Senegal made an important turnaround, thanks to the reform program, with a growth in GDP averaging over 5% annually during 1995–2004. Annual inflation had been pushed down to the low single digits.

As a member of the West African Economic and Monetary Union (WAEMU), Senegal is working toward greater regional integration with a unified external tariff and a more stable monetary policy. Senegal still relies heavily upon outside donor assistance, however. Under the IMF's Highly Indebted Poor Countries debt relief program, Senegal will benefit from eradication of two-thirds of its bilateral, multilateral, and private sector debt, contingent on the completion of privatization program proposed by the government and approved by the IMF.

== Macroeconomic statistics ==
=== Indebtedness ===
With an external debt of U.S.$2,495 million, and with its economic reform program on track, Senegal qualified for the multilateral debt relief initiative for Heavily Indebted Poor Countries (HIPC). Progress on structural reforms is on track, but the pace of reforms remains slow, as delays occur in implementing a number of measures on the privatization program, good governance issues, and the promotion of private sector activity.

Macroeconomic indicators show that Senegal turned in a respectable performance in meeting IMF targets in 2000: annual GDP growth increased to 5.7%, compared to 5.1% in 1999. Inflation was reported to be 0.7% compared to 0.8% in 1999, and the current account deficit (excluding transfers) was held at less than 6% of GDP.

In 2025, a report from the British bank Barclays reassesses the country's public debt at 119% of GDP for 2024. A figure calculated from the multi-year budgetary and economic programming document of the Ministry of the Economy of June 2025, which makes Senegal the most indebted country in Africa.

=== Macro-economic trends ===
Historical development of real GDP per capita in Senegal, since 1950

This is a chart of trend of gross domestic product of Senegal at market prices estimated by the International Monetary Fund with figures in millions of CFA Francs.

Year	Gross domestic product	US dollar exchange	Inflation index (2000=100)
1980	652,221	211.27 CFA Francs	?
1985	1,197,462	449.32 CFA Francs	66
1990	1,603,679	272.27 CFA Francs	66
1995	2,309,091	499.15 CFA Francs	93
2000	3,192,019	709.96 CFA Francs	100
2005	4,387,230	526.55 CFA Francs	107

Average wages in 2007 hover around $4–5 per day.

The following table shows the main economic indicators in 1980–2026. Inflation below 5% is in green. Figures until 2025 are IMF estimates; figures for 2026 are projections.

Year	GDP (in Bil. US$PPP)	GDP per capita (in US$ PPP)	GDP (in bil. US$ nominal)	GDP growth (real)	Inflation rate (in Percent)	Government debt (in % of GDP)
1980	5.8	1,023	4.3	▼-0.8%	▲8.8%	n/a
1981	▲6.6	▲1,145	▼3.9	▲5.1%	▲5.8%	n/a
1982	▲7.6	▲1,276	▼3.9	▲7.8%	▲17.4%	n/a
1983	▼7.5	▼1,220	▼3.4	▼-5.3%	▲11.7%	n/a
1984	▲8.0	▲1,273	▼3.4	▲3.7%	▲11.7%	n/a
1985	▲8.6	▲1,317	▲3.7	▲3.3%	▲13.0%	n/a
1986	▲9.0	▲1,344	▲5.2	▲3.1%	▲6.1%	n/a
1987	▲9.8	▲1,418	▲6.2	▲6.1%	▼-4.1%	n/a
1988	▲10.1	▼1,416	▼6.2	▼-0.6%	▼-1.8%	n/a
1989	▲10.9	▲1,485	▼6.1	▲4.0%	▲0.4%	n/a
1990	▲11.2	▲1,486	▲7.1	▼-0.7%	▲0.3%	n/a
1991	▲11.9	▲1,532	▼7.0	▲2.6%	▼-1.8%	n/a
1992	▲12.3	▲1,544	▲7.4	▲1.2%	▲0.0%	n/a
1993	▲12.8	▲1,555	▼7.0	▲1.3%	▼-0.7%	n/a
1994	▲13.0	▼1,541	▼4.7	▼-0.2%	▲32.1%	n/a
1995	▲14.1	▲1,625	▲6.0	▲6.1%	▲8.1%	n/a
1996	▲14.7	▲1,644	▲6.3	▲1.9%	▲2.8%	n/a
1997	▲15.3	▲1,677	▼5.9	▲2.7%	▲1.8%	▲67.8%
1998	▲16.4	▲1,755	▲6.4	▲6.0%	▲1.0%	▼18.8%
1999	▲17.6	▲1,843	▲6.6	▲6.0%	▲0.8%	▼15.0%
2000	▲18.7	▲1,912	▼6.0	▲3.9%	▲0.8%	▲57.5%
2001	▲20.0	▲1,991	▲6.5	▲4.3%	▲3.1%	▼53.2%
2002	▲20.3	▼1,975	▲7.0	▲0.1%	▲2.4%	▼52.0%
2003	▲21.9	▲2,074	▲8.8	▲5.6%	▲0.0%	▼42.9%
2004	▲23.5	▲2,173	▲10.1	▲4.6%	▲0.0%	▼38.0%
2005	▲25.3	▲2,279	▲11.0	▲4.3%	▲1.6%	▼36.1%
2006	▲26.7	▲2,343	▲11.7	▲2.3%	▲2.2%	▼17.5%
2007	▲28.2	▲2,409	▲14.0	▲2.8%	▲5.5%	▲19.0%
2008	▲29.8	▲2,479	▲16.9	▲3.7%	▲6.2%	▲19.1%
2009	▲30.8	▲2,495	▼16.1	▲2.8%	▼-1.0%	▲29.9%
2010	▲32.2	▲2,540	▲16.1	▲3.4%	▲0.0%	▲34.6%
2011	▲33.3	▲2,555	▲17.8	▲1.3%	▲3.4%	▼32.9%
2012	▲35.3	▲2,633	▼17.7	▲4.0%	▲1.4%	▲34.5%
2013	▲36.8	▲2,666	▲18.9	▲2.4%	▲0.7%	▲36.9%
2014	▲39.7	▲2,802	▲19.8	▲6.2%	▼-1.1%	▲42.4%
2015	▲42.6	▲2,925	▼17.8	▲6.4%	▲0.1%	▲44.5%
2016	▲45.8	▲3,053	▲19.0	▲6.4%	▲0.8%	▲47.5%
2017	▲50.1	▲3,246	▲21.0	▲7.4%	▲2.2%	▲61.1%
2018	▲53.8	▲3,393	▲23.1	▲6.2%	▲0.5%	▲61.5%
2019	▲59.7	▲3,661	▲23.4	▲4.6%	▲1.0%	▲81.5%
2020	▲63.0	▲3,763	▲24.6	▲1.3%	▲2.5%	▲90.1%
2021	▲71.9	▲4,178	▲27.5	▲6.5%	▲2.2%	▲98.7%
2022	▲80.0	▲4,523	▲27.8	▲3.9%	▲9.7%	▲104.7%
2023	▲86.4	▲4,759	▲30.7	▲4.3%	▲5.9%	▲118.4%
2024	▲94.0	▲5,039	▲32.8	▲6.1%	▲0.8%	▲132.4%
2025	▲104.3	▲5,441	▲37.1	▲7.9%	▲1.4%	▼130.2%
2026	▲109.6	▲5,565	▲40.5	▲2.2%	▲2.5%	▲132.3%

== External trade and investment ==
Exports of Senegal by product category (2019) Chemical products Transportation Machines Mineral products Plastics and rubbers Metals Foodstuffs Precious metals Textiles Instruments Animal products Vegetable products Paper goods Footwear and headwear Miscellaneous Stone and glass Wood products Animal and vegetable bi-products Animal hides Arts and antiques Weapons

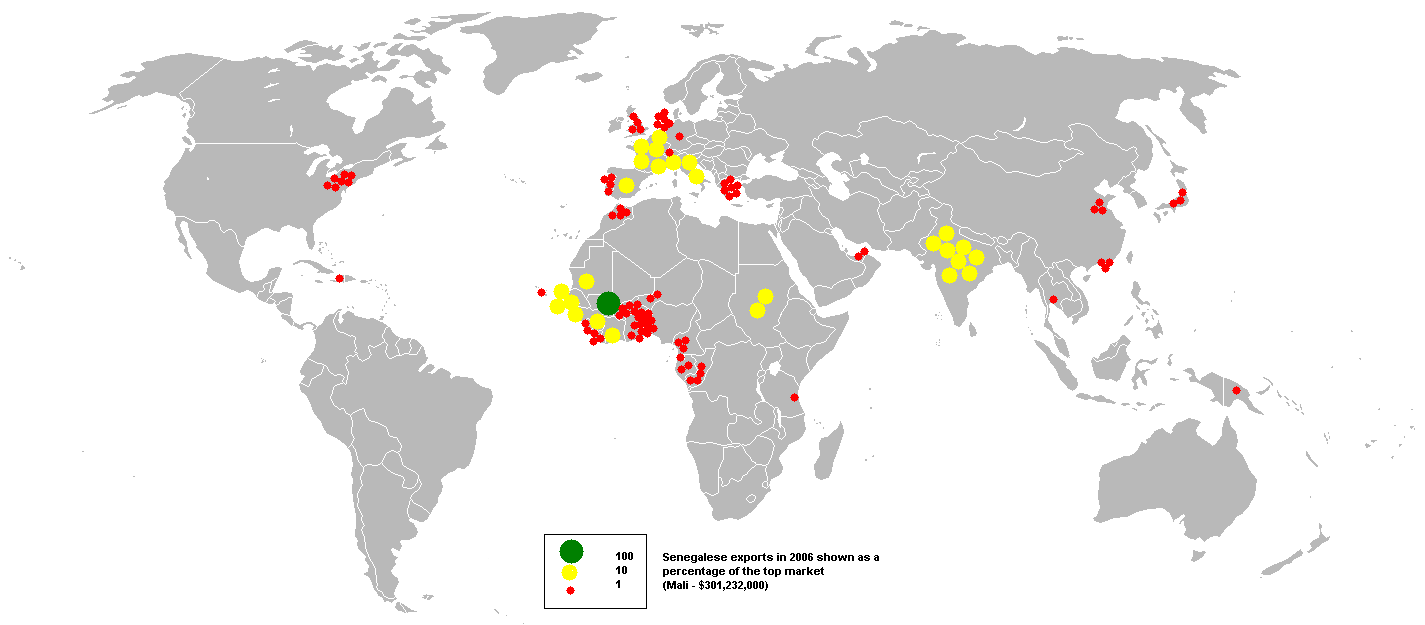
Senegal's export destinations, 2006.

The fishing sector has replaced the groundnut sector as Senegal's export leader. Its export earnings reached U.S.$239 million in 2000. The industrial fishing operations struggle with high costs, and Senegalese tuna is rapidly losing the French market to more efficient Asian competitors.

Phosphate production, the second major foreign exchange earner, has been steady at about U.S.$95 million. Exports of peanut products reached U.S.$79 million in 2000 and represented 11% of total export earnings. Receipts from tourism, the fourth major foreign exchange earner, have picked up since the January 1994 devaluation. In 2000, some 500,000 tourists visited Senegal, earning the country $120 million.

Senegal's new Agency for the Promotion of Investment (APIX) plays a pivotal role in the government's foreign investment program. Its objective is to increase the investment rate from its current level of 20.6% to 30%. Currently, there are no restrictions on the transfer or repatriation of capital and income earned, or investment financed with convertible foreign exchange. Direct U.S. investment in Senegal remains about U.S.$38 million, mainly in petroleum marketing, pharmaceuticals manufacturing, chemicals, and banking. Economic assistance, about U.S.$350 million a year, comes largely from France, the IMF, the World Bank, and the United States. Canada, Italy, Japan, and Germany also provide assistance.

Senegal has well-developed though costly port facilities, a major international airport serving 23 international airlines, and direct and expanding telecommunications links with major world centers.

Cargo consigned to Senegal is covered by the bordereau de suivi des cargaisons (BSC), also known as the BESC, an electronic cargo tracking note administered by the Conseil sénégalais des chargeurs (COSEC), the country's national shippers' council; a published list of products is exempt from the requirement.

== Regional and international economic groupings ==
- Organization of African Unity (OAU)/Africa Union
- The Franc Zone
- The Lomé Convention
- Economic Community of West African States (ECOWAS)
- Union économique et monétaire Ouest Africaine (UEMOA)
- The African Groundnut Council
- the Organisation pour la mise en valeur du fleuve Sénégal

== Trade unions ==
Senegalese trade unions include The National Confederation of Senegalese Workers (CNTS) and its affiliate the Dakar Dem Dikk Workers Democratic Union (Dakar Public Transport workers), The Democratic Union of Senegalese Workers (UTDS), The General Confederation Of Democratic Workers Of Senegal (CGTDS) and the National Union of Autonomous Trade Unions of Senegal (UNSAS). Mean wages were $0.99 per man-hour in 2009.

== Sectors ==
=== Agriculture ===
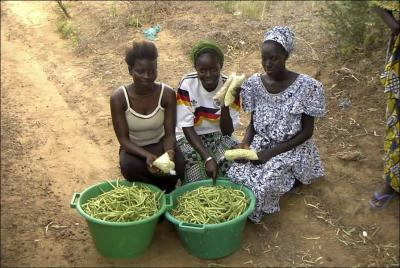
Cowpea vendors near Thies, Senegal

Agriculture is one of the dominant parts of Senegal's economy, even though Senegal lies within the drought-prone Sahel region. As only a tiny percentage of the land is irrigated, Senegal continues to rely on rain-fed agriculture. Agriculture occupies about 75% of the workforce. Despite a relatively wide variety of agricultural production, most farmers produce for subsistence needs. Millet, rice, corn, and sorghum are the primary food crops grown in Senegal. Production is subject to drought and threats of pests such as locusts, birds, fruit flies, and white flies. Moreover, the effects of climate change in Senegal are expected to severely harm the agricultural economy due to extreme weather such as drought, as well as increased temperatures.

Senegal is a net food importer, particularly for rice, which represents almost 75% of cereal imports. Peanuts, sugarcane, and cotton are important cash crops, and a wide variety of fruits and vegetables are grown for local and export markets. In 2006, gum arabic exports soared to $280 million, making it by far the leading agricultural export. Green beans, industrial tomato, cherry tomato, melon, and mango are Senegal's main vegetable cash crops. The Casamance region, isolated from the rest of Senegal by Gambia, is an important agricultural producing area, but without the infrastructure or transportation links to improve its capacity.

Despite the lack of modernization of artisanal fishing, the fishing sector remains Senegal's main economic resource and major foreign exchange earner. The livestock and poultry sectors are relatively underdeveloped and have potential for modernization, development and growth. Senegal imports most of its milk and dairy products. The sector is inhibited due to low output and limited investments. The potential production of fauna and forest products is high and diversified, and could, if well organized, benefit poor farmers in rural areas. Although the agricultural sector was impacted by a locust invasion in 2004, it has recovered and gross agricultural production is expected to increase by 6.1% in 2006 and 5.1% in 2007.

=== Mining ===
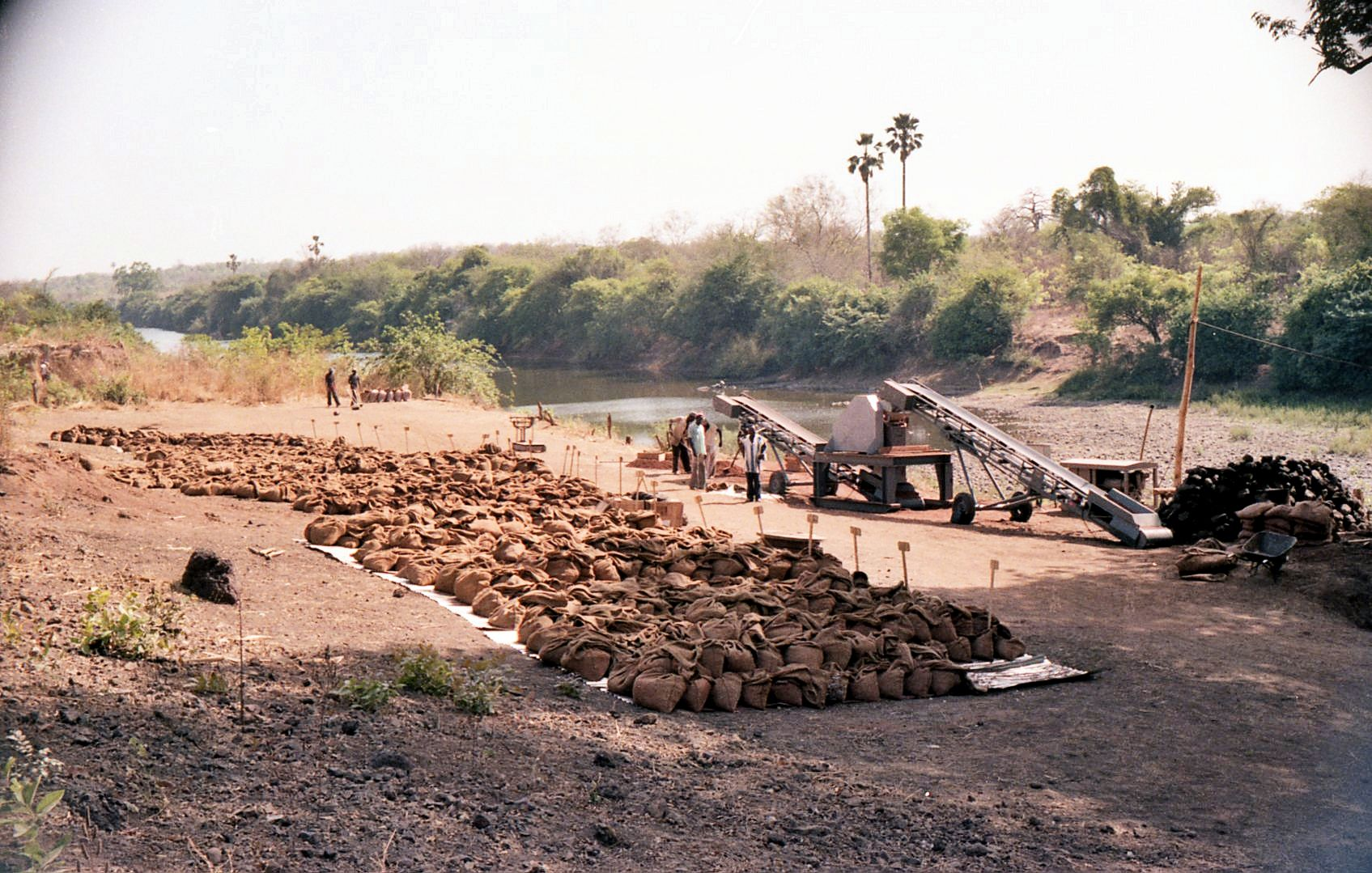
Falémé mine

The mining industry of Senegal (French: Industrie minière du Sénégal) is mainly centred on the production of phosphates and industrial limestone. Senegal is one of the leading producers of phosphates in the world, accounting for about 6% of exports in 2006, and deposits are of a particularly high quality. In the coastal region of the country, titanium-bearing minerals have been found and the reserve is estimated at 10 million tons. The mineral sector's exports accounts for 20% of total exports of the country and constitutes 20% of the GDP.

Senegal's relatively poor natural resources may have contributed to a long period of political stability (2012). The mining in Senegal is relatively poor. Senegal has not had a rich mining industry or a disruptive government. Gold has been found in the east of the country and it is hoped that this can be exploited to benefit a continuing stable country.

=== Tourism ===
Tourism in Senegal is a vital part of the West African nation's economy.

=== Construction sector ===
In recent years, many construction sites have been halted by the Senegalese government for inspections. Investments account for 4% of GDP and employ nearly 200,000 people.

=== Oil and gas ===
Senegal began offshore petroleum production in 2024. On 11 June 2024 the Australian operator Woodside Energy, together with the national oil company Petrosen, achieved first oil at the Sangomar field, about 100 kilometres south of Dakar — the country's first offshore oil project. Production uses a floating production storage and offloading vessel, the Léopold Sédar Senghor, with a nameplate capacity of around 100,000 barrels per day.

=== Stock exchange ===
Senegal's corporations are included in the Bourse Régionale des Valeurs Mobilières SA (BRVM), a regional stock exchange serving eight West African countries, and located in Abidjan, Cote d'Ivoire.

=== Other economic activities ===
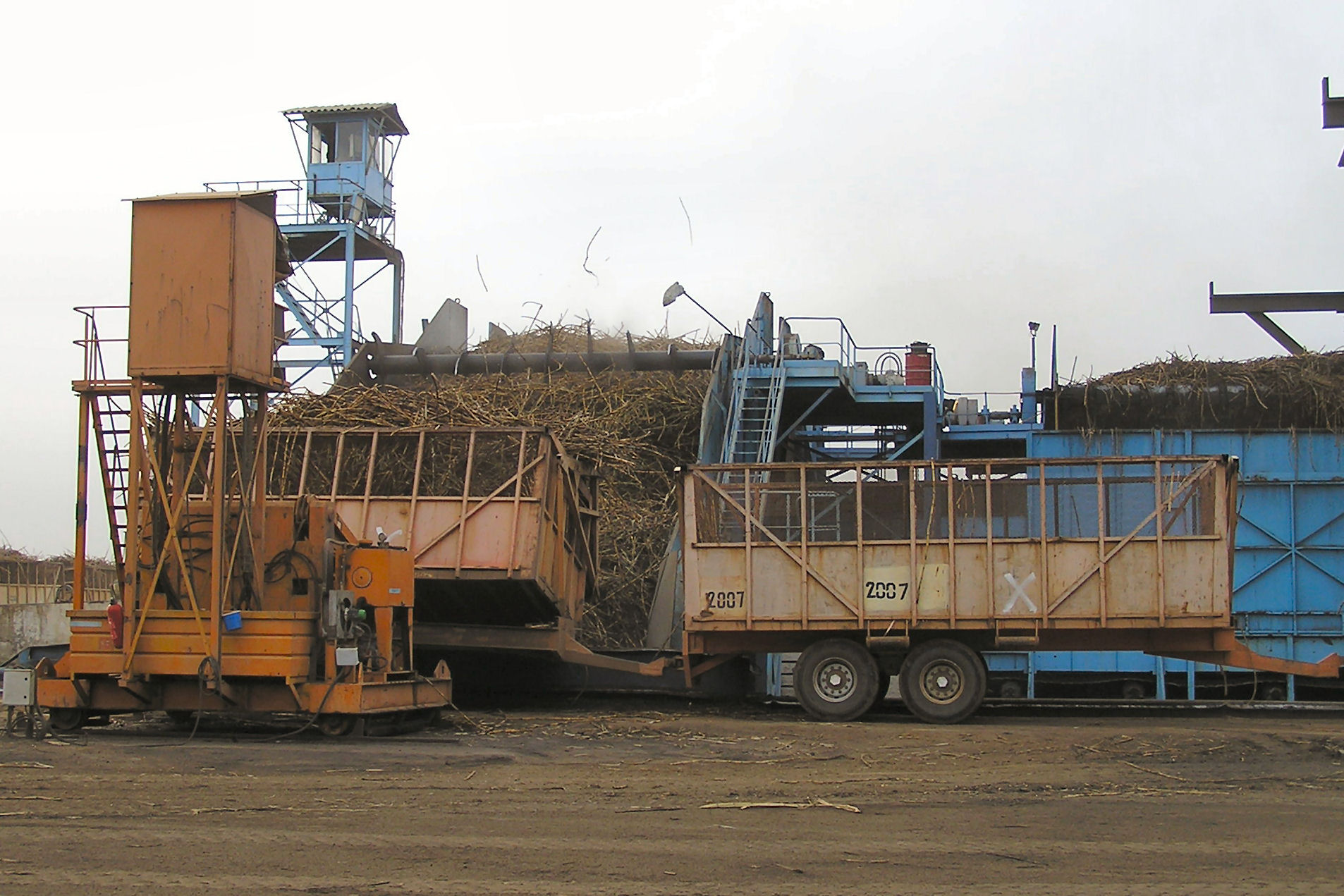
A sugar processing plant of the Compagnie sucrière sénégalaise at Richard Toll.

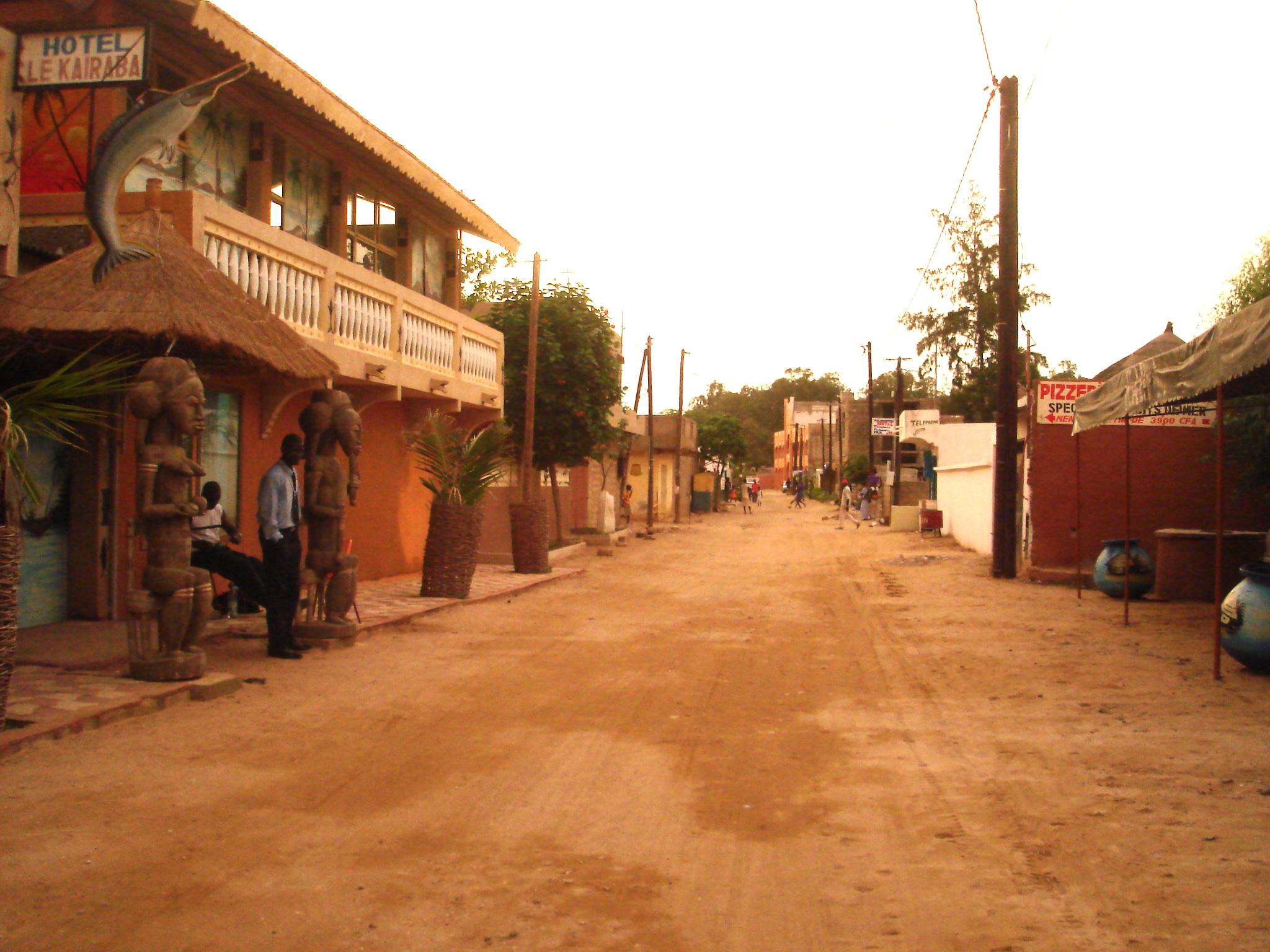
The main street of the tourist resort town of Saly.

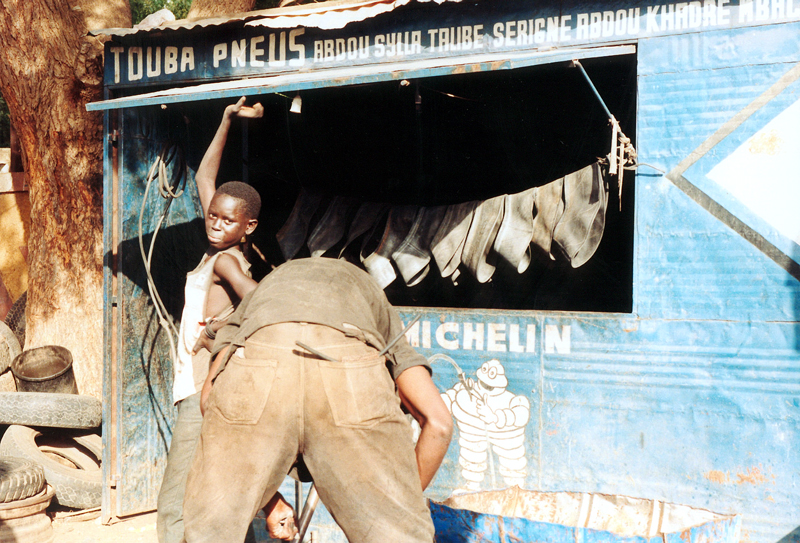
Many small businesses, like this tyre repair shop in Touba, are financed through the Mouride Islamic brotherhood.

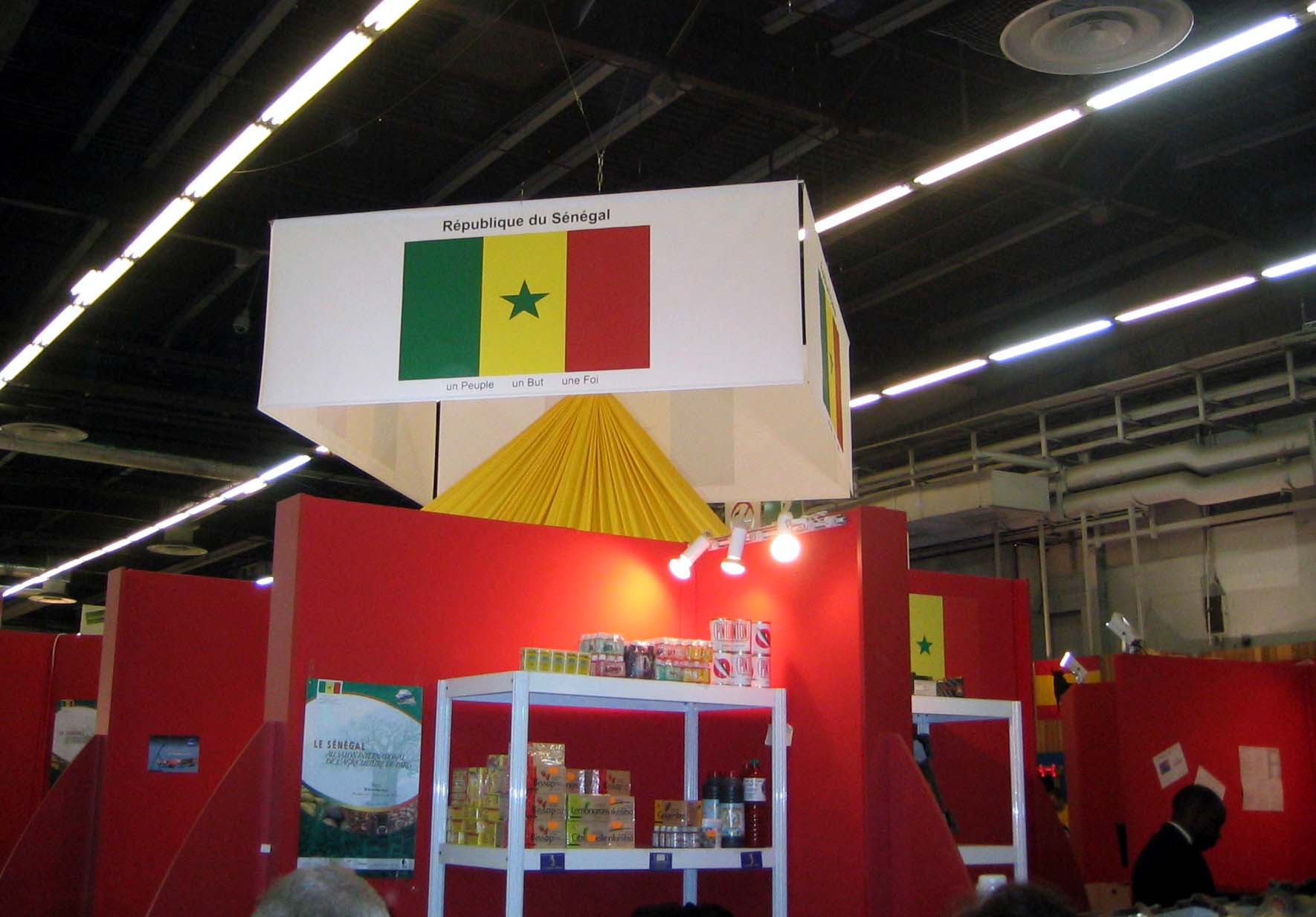
Paris Salon international de l'Agriculture 2007: the government actively promotes agricultural exports to markets outside the developing world.

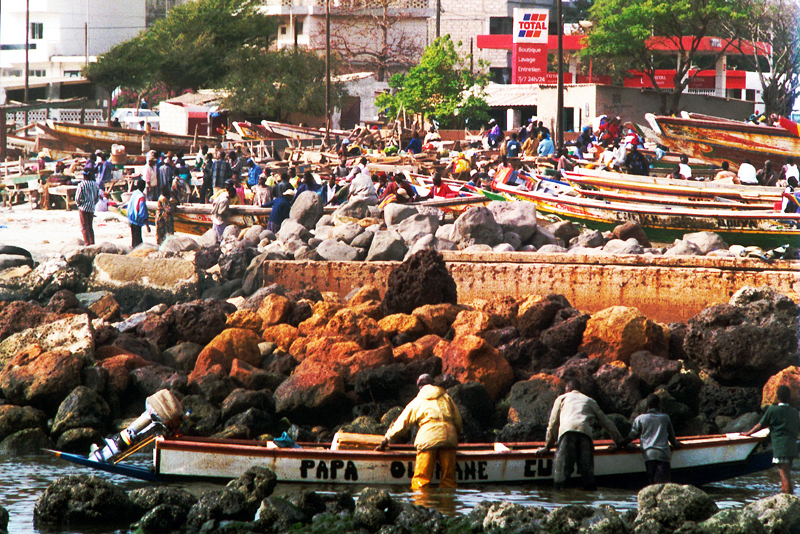
Small-scale fishing for local markets is visible throughout the country. Here fishermen return to the beach at Soumbedioun, Dakar.

== Infrastructure ==
=== Energy ===
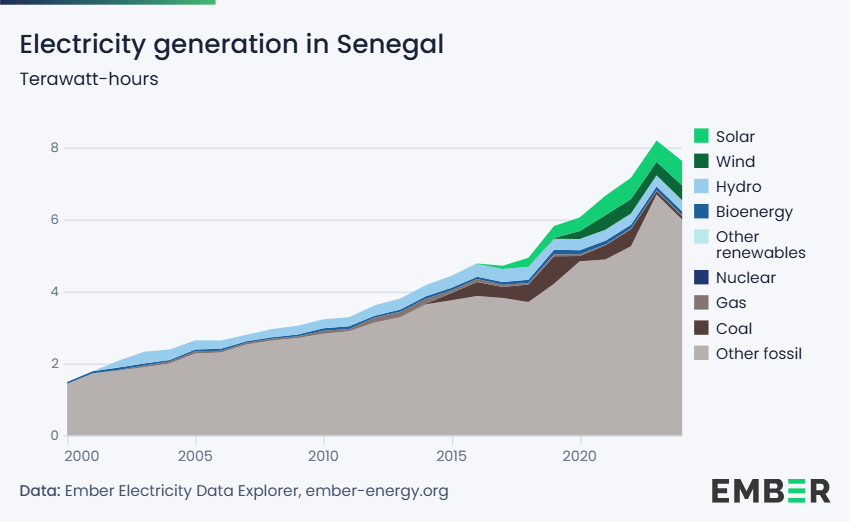
Electricity generation in Senegal in terawatt-hours

As of April 2020, the energy sector in Senegal has an installed capacity of 1431 megawatts (MW). Energy is produced by private operators and sold to the Senelec energy corporation. According to a 2020 report by the International Energy Agency, Senegal had nearly 70% of the country connected to the national grid. Current government strategies for electrification include investments in off-grid solar and connection to the grid.

Most of the energy production is from fossil fuels, mostly diesel and gas (733 of 864 MW). An increasing amount of the energy production comes from sustainable sources, such as Manantali Dam in Mali and a new wind farm in Thiès opened in 2020—however, it is still a small portion of the total production. Despite increases in production in the 2010s, the economy is frequently hindered by energy shortages compared to demand.

=== Transport ===
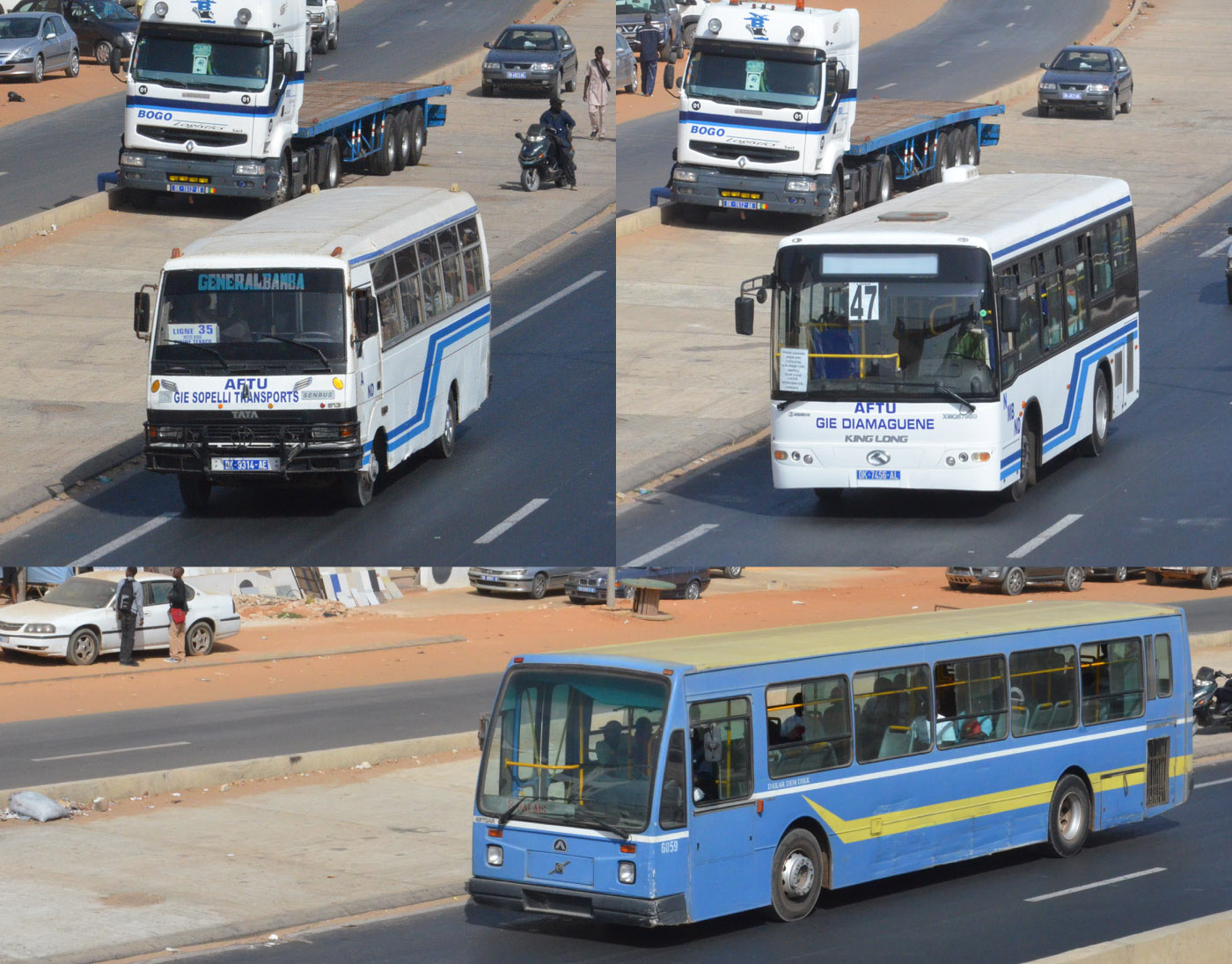
Various buses in Dakar

Senegal is a coastal country where maritime transport is possible. Also a developing country, its infrastructure is growing and is covered by air, rail road and water.

=== Telecommunications ===
Telecommunications in Senegal include radio, television, fixed and mobile telephones, and the Internet.

In 2012 the country had roughly 338,200 landlines for its 13.0 million inhabitants. A number of cyber cafés are located in the capital, Dakar, and other cities.

== See also ==
- Senegal
- Tourism in Senegal
- Agriculture in Senegal
- Communications in Senegal
- Transport in Senegal
- Economy of Africa
- CFA franc
- United Nations Economic Commission for Africa
