= Trade unions in Senegal =

- National organization(s): CNTS, UDTS, UNSAS
- Density: 22% (2015)

Global Rights Index
- 4 Systematic violations of rights

International Labour Organization
- Senegal is a member of the ILO

Convention ratification
- Freedom of Association: 4 November 1960
- Right to Organise: 28 July 1961

Trade unionism is a powerful force in the politics, economy, and culture of Senegal, and was one of the earliest trades union movements to form in Francophone West Africa.

== History of Trade unionism in Senegal ==
Senegal has a long history of Trade Union activism, and was one of the first centers of the African trade union movement, with small unions forming under French colonial rule in the 1920s. During the 1930s Popular Front government of France, limited union legalisation was extended to French subjects in West Africa. Senegal was also the home to the Four Communes, the only areas of French West Africa to afford residents (Originaires) French citizenship.

In the year and a half after limited unionisation rights were granted to colonial subjects and residents of the Four Communes alike (from May to November 1937), 42 professional unions had been created in Senegal. This rapid development included the creation of an all-African trade union confederation for the Dakar area in 1938.

In 1947 railroad workers went on a several-month strike on the Dakar-Niger Railway to obtain the same rights as the French railwaymen. The successful strike was celebrated as a turning point in the anti-colonial struggle by Senegalese writer Ousmane Sembène in his 1960 novel Les bouts de bois de Dieu.

== Contemporary union movement ==
Senegal's fundamental labor legislation is based on the French overseas labor code of 1952, which provides for collective agreements between employers and trade unions, for the fixing of basic minimum wages by the government on recommendation of advisory committees. The code also provides for paid annual leave and for child allowances. The right to strike is recognized by law, and there are special labor courts.

The largest trade union organization is the National Confederation of Senegalese Workers, which since 1970 has been the official union affiliated with the ruling PS. Its major rival is the National Union of Autonomous Labor Unions of Senegal. The industrial workforce is almost totally unionized. Although the relative number of union members is small, they have considerable political power due to their control of vital segments of the economy.

The minimum working age is 16, when minors may work in apprenticeships. The prohibition of child labor is strictly enforced in the formal sector, but somewhat less so in the informal and traditional economies. The labor law provides for a workweek of 40 to 48 hours and minimum occupational and safety and health regulations. However, these labor regulations are not effectively enforced outside of the formal economy. The minimum wage was $0.37 in 2001.

== Principal Trade Union and Confederations ==
- Democratic Union of Senegalese Workers Union Démocratique des Travailleurs de Sénégal (UDTS)
- National Confederation of Senegalese Workers Confédération Nationale des Travailleurs du Sénégal (CNTS)
- Dakar Dem Dikk Workers Democratic Union: Dakar Public Transit Workers, Union démocratique des travailleurs de Dakar Dem Dikk, (UDT-3D)
- National Confederation of Senegalese Workers - Force of Change Confédération Nationale des Travailleurs du Sénégal - Forces du Changemen (CNTS-FC)
- National Union of Autonomous Trade Unions of Senegal Union Nationale des Syndicats Autonomes de Sénégal (UNSAS)
- Senegales Confederation of Free Unions Confédération des syndicats autonomes du Sénégal (CSA)
- General Confederation of Office and Administrative Workers Confédération générale des syndicats de cadres et du personnel d'encadrement (COGES)
- General Confederation of Senegalese Democratic Workers Confédérations générale des travailleurs démocratiques du Sénégal (CGTDS)
- General Federation of Senegalese Workers - Tendency A Fédération générale des travailleurs du Sénégal - Tendance A (FGTS)
- General Federation of Senegalese Workers - Tendency B Fédération générale des travailleurs du Sénégal - Tendance B (FGTS)
- Union of Free Senegalese Workers Union des travailleurs libres du Sénégal (UTLS)
- Union of Senegalese Democratic Workers Syndicat des travailleurs démocratique du Sénégal (STDS)

=== Historic unions ===
- Senegalese Workers Union, Union Sénégalaise des Travailleurs 1962-64
