= Grande Côte Operations =

- Type: Subsidiary
- Industry: Mining
- Founded: 2014
- Headquarters: Senegal
- Area served: Senegal
- Products: Zircon, ilmenite, rutile, leucoxene
- Parent: Eramet
- Website: https://grande-cote.eramet.com

Grande Côte Operations (often abbreviated GCO) is a mineral sands mining company operating along the Atlantic coast of northern Senegal. The company extracts and processes heavy mineral sands containing zircon and titanium-bearing minerals for export. Grande Côte Operations is a subsidiary of the French mining group Eramet, with a minority ownership stake (10%) held by the Government of Senegal.

== History ==
Grande Côte Operations was established in the early 2010s as part of the development of the Grande Côte Mineral Sands Project, following the discovery and evaluation of extensive heavy mineral sands deposits along Senegal's coastal dune system north of Dakar. Industrial production began in the mid-2010s, marking Senegal's entry into large-scale mineral sands mining.

== Operations ==
The company operates a mobile dredge mining system that extracts mineral-rich sands from coastal dune deposits in the Thiès and Louga regions. The extracted sands are processed through concentration and mineral separation plants to produce zircon, ilmenite, rutile and leucoxene. These minerals are exported for use in industrial applications such as ceramics, pigments and metallurgical products. The 25-year exploitation concession was awarded in 2006 and will last until 2032.

== Economic role ==
Grande Côte Operations is one of Senegal's major producers of mineral sands and contributes to the country's mineral exports, particularly zircon and titanium-bearing minerals.

== Environmental and social issues ==
Large-scale coastal mineral sands mining has generated public debate in Senegal, particularly regarding environmental impacts, land use changes and effects on local livelihoods in areas affected by dredge-based mining. These issues have been reported by international media and analysed in policy research on extractive industries in Senegal.

== See also ==
- Eramet
- Mining industry of Senegal
- Heavy mineral sands ore deposits
