= Dakar Dem Dikk =

Public transport operator of Dakar, Senegal

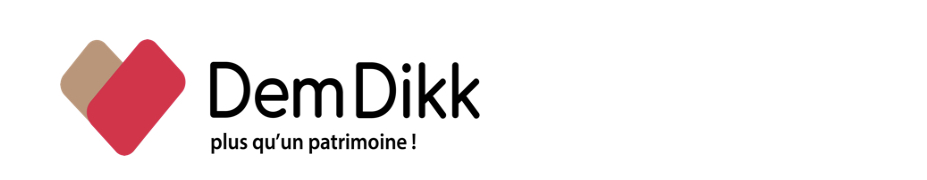
- Industry: Public transportation
- Founded: 2000
- Headquarters: Dakar, Senegal
- Key people: Assane Mbengue
- Website: demdikk.sn

Dakar Dem Dikk (DDD) (English translation: Dakar Round Trip) is a national public transport operator in Senegal, and is the main public transport operator of its capital, Dakar.

It was established in 2000 as the successor to the Société de transport du Cap-Vert (Cape Verde Transport Company). Initially focused on urban transit within Dakar and its environs, the company expanded its services in 2017 to include interurban routes, spanning approximately twenty cities within Senegal. In 2019, Dakar Dem Dikk reported a significant ridership, with 250,000 individuals utilizing its urban transit services daily and 318,000 for interurban travel, although a 2022 study revealed that Dakar Dem Dikk fulfilled only 6% of Dakar's transportation demand. The company has extended its reach beyond national borders, inaugurating the Dakar-Banjul route in January 2020.

User perceptions of Dakar Dem Dikk's buses have been revealed to be favorable, particularly in terms of affordability and journey time, though concerns persist regarding waiting times and seating availability.

== History ==
The company was formed in 2000 or 2001 (sources differ) as a successor to the former Société de transport du Cap-Vert (Cape Verde Transport Company; SOTRAC).

In 2015, Dakar Dem Dikk ordered a fleet of 475 buses from Ashok Leyland of India, at a cost of 47 million CFA Francs (then 71.6 million Euros). That year, the company ran seventeen-lines in Dakar, carrying 50 million passengers per year, using 408 buses.

Initially focused on urban transit in Dakar and its environs, the company expanded its reach in 2017 to include interurban routes spanning approximately twenty cities within Senegal. By August, it connected almost all major cities in Senegal to Dakar, with sometimes two departures per day for the busiest routes. Six months after the launch of the national interurban network, the service experienced popular success despite slightly higher fares than other companies. In 2019, Dakar Dem Dikk reported an average daily ridership of 250,000 individuals for urban transit and 318,000 individuals for interurban travel.

In January 2020, Dakar Dem Dik inaugurated the Dakar-Banjul route between the Senegalese and Gambian capitals. Mamadou Sileye Anne, head of the Africa Dem Dikk project, disclosed plans to expand services to Bissau from Dakar and Ziguinchor. Subsequent routes to Nouakchott, Bamako, Conakry, Ouagadougou, Abidjan, Niamey, and Lomé were outlined, with timelines subject to negotiation progress.

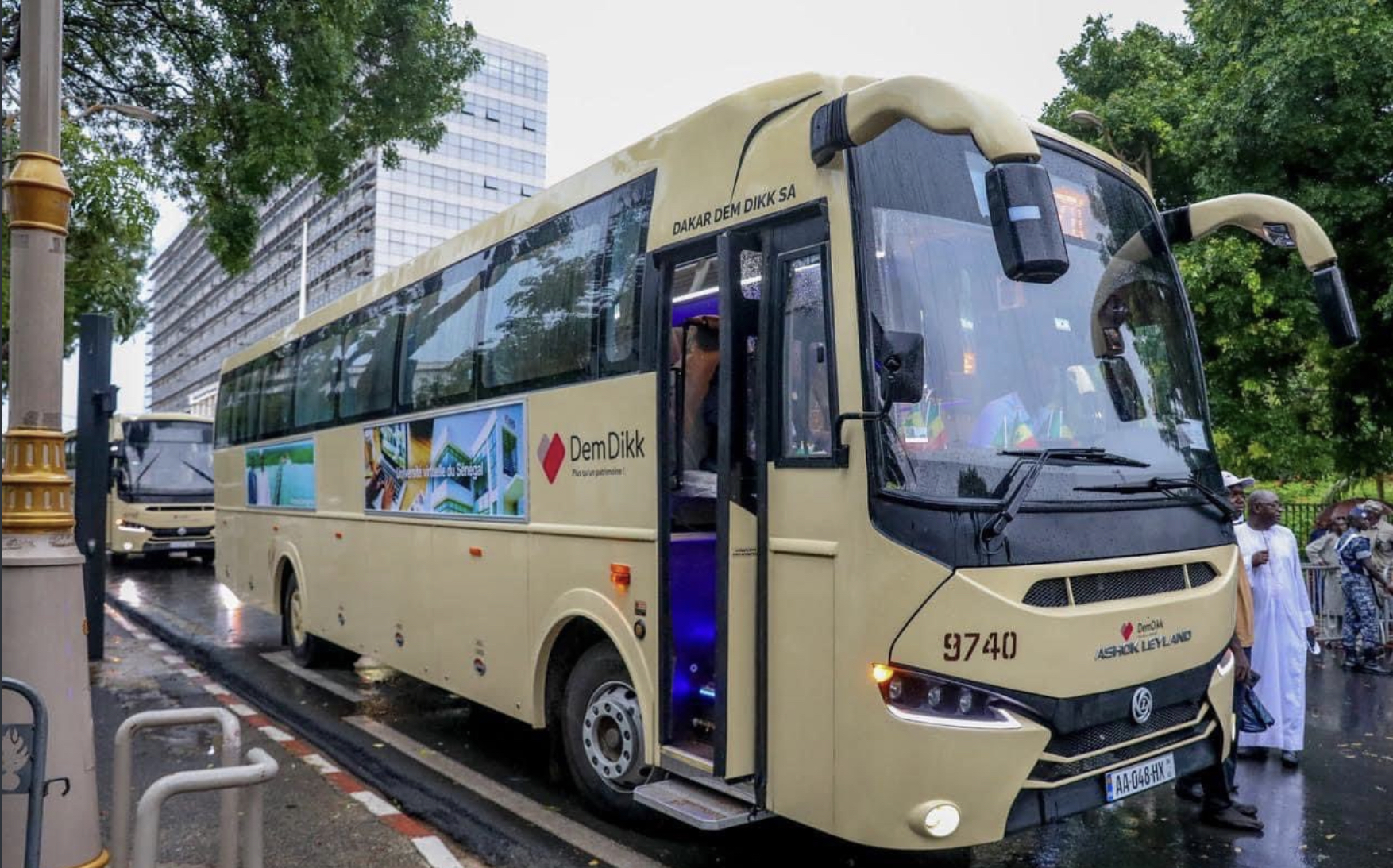
Dakar Dem Dikk bus in the streets of Dakar, July 2021

In November 2022, it was reported that Dakar Dem Dikk faced challenges in renewing its fleet of buses, which were in a state of disrepair. Alioune Badara Konaté, Secretary-General of the Democratic Union of Workers of Dakar Dem Dikk, highlighted the urgent need for fleet renewal, citing the untenable situation where only about 50 buses were operational per day in Dakar and its suburbs. Despite a reported contract signed between the Senegalese government and the Franco-Italian automobile manufacturer Iveco Group for the delivery of 1,400 vehicles in two phases, the arrangement appeared to be pending finalization. Former DDD CEO Omar Bounkhatab Sylla had anticipated the imminent arrival of these new buses in July, with a lifespan estimated at fifteen to twenty years. However, his successor, Ousmane Sylla, postponed the delivery to the end of the first quarter of 2023.

A 2022 study by the Friedrich Ebert Foundation on urbanization challenges in Dakar revealed that Dakar Dem Dikk fulfilled only 6% of the transportation demand. Mini-buses by Aftu (Tata) were reportedly the most widely used mode of transportation, followed by rapid transit buses, informal shared taxis known as "clandos", traditional taxis, and Ndiaga Ndiaye buses. According to the study, Dakar Dem Dikk's buses are positively evaluated by users in terms of cost and journey time, with 86% considering them affordable and 74% finding them fast. The company's buses are perceived as the safest mode of public transport in Dakar. However, users expressed concerns about waiting times and limited seating space, with 54% reporting long wait times and 57% feeling that there are few available seats.

In 2024, Dakar Dem Dikk suspended its routes to Touba, Tivaouane, and M'Bour from March 22 to March 25, coinciding with the Senegalese presidential election on March 24. On April 29, company workers on strike due to dissatisfaction among employees with management decisions. The strike, initiated by the members of the Dakar Dem Dikk Workers Democratic Union, was triggered by perceived favoritism in promotions, with employees accusing the management of promoting individuals who supported the CEO during the last election campaign. The employees demanded the annulment of the recent service notes and threatened to escalate to an indefinite strike if their grievances regarding promotions, working conditions, and salaries were not addressed promptly. The accusations were refuted by CEO Ousmane Sylla. He explained that organizational changes had been made due to technical issues and management deficiencies and were aimed to improve operational excellence and streamline personnel, and expressed confidence in an upcoming audit. The strike was suspended that same day.

== Organization ==
In May 2024, Assane Mbengue replaced Ousmane Sylla as CEO. In December 2011, 73,33% of the company was state-owned.

The trade union Dakar Dem Dikk Workers Democratic Union represents their workers.
