= Mining industry of Senegal =

Mining in Senegal

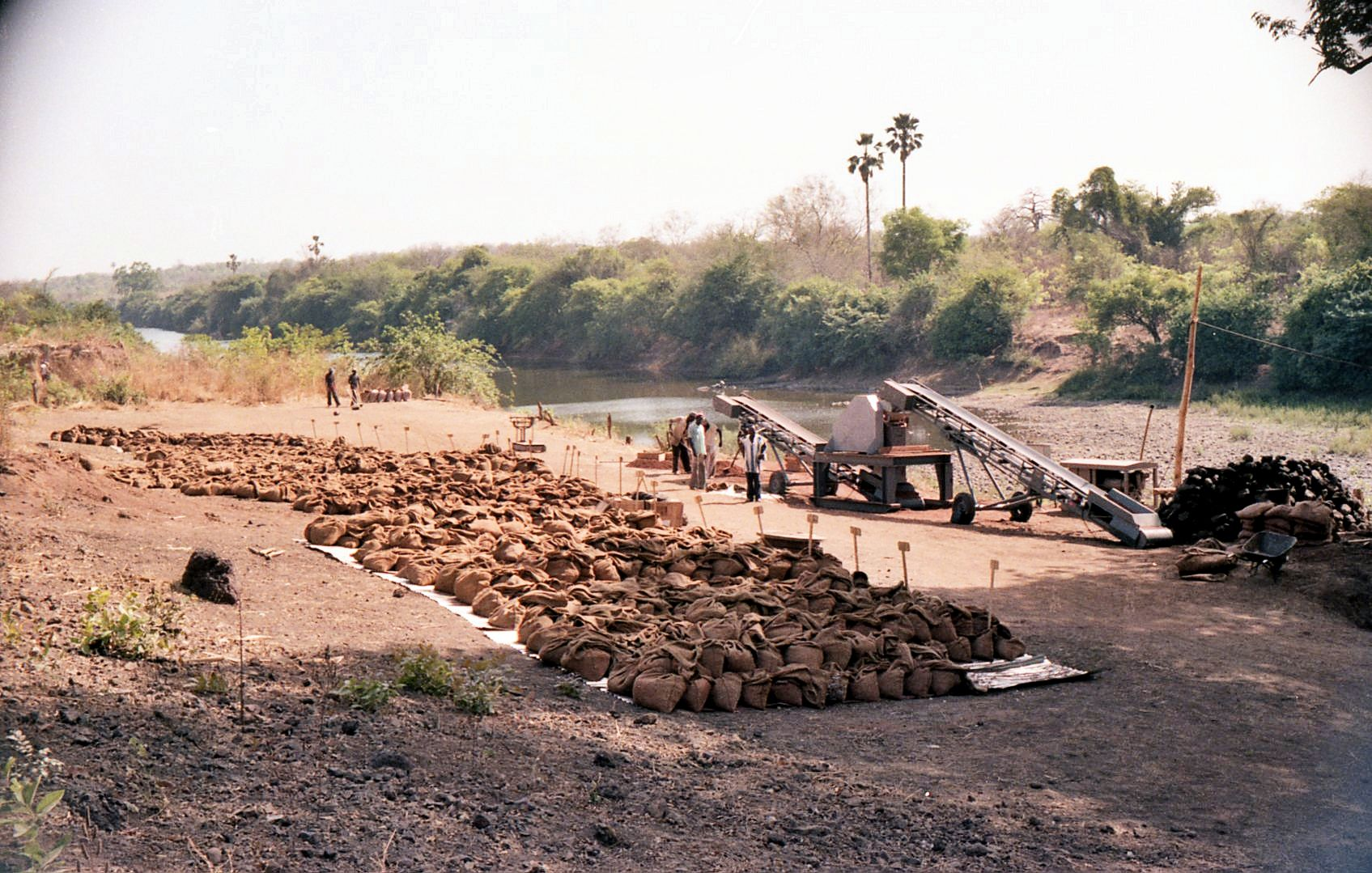
Falémé mine

The mining industry of Senegal (French: Industrie minière du Sénégal) is mainly centred on the production of phosphates and industrial limestone. Senegal is one of the leading producers of phosphates in the world, accounting for about 6% of exports in 2006, and deposits are of a particularly high quality. In the coastal region of the country, titanium-bearing minerals have been found and the reserve is estimated at 10 million tons. The mineral sector's exports accounts for 20% of total exports of the country and constitutes 20% of the GDP.

Senegal's relatively poor natural resources may have contributed to a long period of political stability (2012). The mining in Senegal is relatively poor. Senegal has not had a rich mining industry or a disruptive government. Gold has been found in the east of the country and it is hoped that this can be exploited to benefit a continuing stable country.

== History ==
Artisanal mining has been practiced traditionally in the country from ancient times, particularly in the southeastern region. During a gold rush period in the 1970s, the land was seriously degraded and people were impoverished.

The phosphate industry began to be exploited in the 1940s and 1950s, when two large phosphate mines at Taiba and Lam-Lam in the Thiès Region began operations. Less authorised mining in the country is the illegal removal of sand. The sand is obtained close to the country's coast by builders.

Since the discovery of large deposits of gold in the eastern Senegal village of Diabougou in 2006, that village hosts the largest "informal" gold mining operation in the country. This mining has seen the village grow from hundreds to thousands. The miners are attracted by the relative ease of extracting gold. The villagers suffer health problems because they are drinking the same water that is used in the gold extraction process. The miners are buying and using the poisonous element mercury. The country's reserves as of 2015 are relatively underdeveloped, and in 2014 it was announced that the Senegalese government was looking to attract foreign investors and use mining as a way to facilitate national economic growth by some 7%.

== Production and impact ==
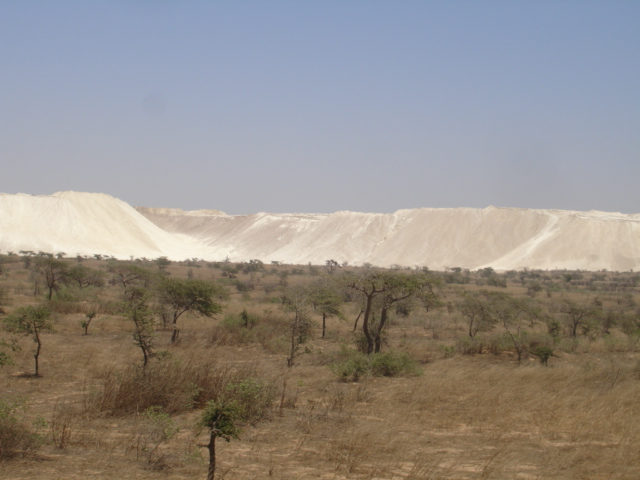
Phosphate field in Senegal

Additional mining sectors have included platinum, iron, uranium, and base metals. Gold mining involves many illegal immigrants and it has been assessed as a "risky business". The small, formal Sabodala mine is operated by Canadian firm Teranga Gold in the south east of the country.

With an estimated 750 million metric tonnes of iron ore reserves, iron mining has taken off in the country since Luxembourg firm ArcelorMittal made an agreement with the Senegalese government in 2007 to operate the Falémé mine in the southeast of the country. It began operations in 2011, and it has been assessed that southeastern Senegal could potentially produce 12 million tons per year for 20 years.

It has been argued that Senegal's relatively poor natural resources have contributed to the country's long period of stability compared to other nearby countries. Unlike Sierra Leone, Zimbabwe, or Liberia there is no significant mining of diamonds or Gold. Rich natural resources can be used by exploitative governments to fund dictatorships. Senegal has not had a rich mining industry or a disruptive government and these facts may be related. Gold has been found in the east of the country and it is hoped that this can be exploited to benefit the country and not the government. Disorganised mining in boom towns like Diabougou is creating health problems caused by mercury poisoning and sexually transmitted diseases.

In recent years, Senegal’s mining industry has expanded beyond traditional phosphate and gold production to include significant heavy mineral sands extraction along the Atlantic coast, notably at the Grande Côte mineral sands project producing zircon, ilmenite, rutile and leucoxene. According to the Extractive Industries Transparency Initiative (EITI), the extractive sector, including mining, accounted for around one-third of Senegal’s total exports in 2023, with phosphate leading overall mineral exports and other minerals contributing to foreign exchange earnings. The use of large dredging equipment in the heavy minerals mining in the Lompoul desert, and the surrounding areas on the Grand Côte, has altered dune landscapes and generated local concerns about environmental impacts and changes to traditional land uses in the region.

== Legal framework ==
The mining legislation drafted on modern practices is an effective code that aims for an overhaul of the mining sector and is meant to encourage private sector participation in exploration and production of several minerals in the country. The "Mineral Policy and Legislation" in the country are framed as rules and regulations which define benefits for participation in the mining sector. Benefits proposed under the Mining Permit system and Mining Concessions, and in the Investment Code, can be drawn upon by the private sector companies participating in the mining operations, depending on the investments made.

== Commodities ==
Gold mining in the Sabodala gold district, in the northeast region, 650 kilometres (400 mi) to the east of Dakar, is under expansion to increase production to 4 metric tons per year. Iron ore extraction at the Faleme iron ore project, in the southeastern region of the country, which has reserves of 50 million tons, was proposed to be implemented as a joint sector project. Titanium and zircon extraction under the Grande Côte mineral sands project was expected to begin production from 2013; the production estimates were projected as: ilmenite 575,000 tons per year, zircon 80,000 tons per year, leucoxene 11,000 tons per year, and rutile 6,000 tons per year. Petroleum and natural gas have also been produced in the country.
