= Diabougou (Senegal) =

- Village
- Location in Senegal
- Coordinates: 14°02′34″N 12°11′45″W
- Country: Senegal
- Region: Tambacounda Region
- Departments of Senegal: Bakel department
- Arrondissements of Senegal: Kéniaba Arrondissement
- Communes of Senegal: Toumboura

Population (2013)estimate by journalist
  - Total: c.10000
- Time zone: UTC + 0

Diabougou is a village in the Tambacounda Region of eastern Senegal, close to the Falémé River. The village has grown rapidly since 2006 due to the thousands of immigrant miners attracted by a local gold rush. Diabougou has the largest informal gold mining operation in Senegal.

== History ==
Diabougou is located in the Tambacounda Region of eastern Senegal. Before the discovery of gold, Diabougou was a traditional village of straw-covered mud huts where the people looked after goats. Historically, the population was about 500 or 1,000.

== Gold mining town ==
Since 2006, when large deposits of gold were discovered here, Diabougou grew rapidly into a mining village, with the traditional round huts now joined by a shanty town of structures built from whatever materials came to hand, from plastic sheeting to planks, sheet metal, and cardboard. A wide range of impromptu shops repair cycles and motorbikes, and sell food and cell phones. It has been estimated that the population was 10,000 in 2013, but the workforce also includes commuters. Being near the border with Mali, the village has attracted workers from across the border as well as from Guinea and The Gambia.

A 2011 report said that the gold rush had given the village a population of thousands, who were joining the unofficial part of the Senegalese mining industry. The new population from nearby Mali is supplemented by workers who use motorbikes to cross the river to commute internationally each day. Workers who do not traditionally come from Diabougou have to pay a levy to the local chief to mine here. The miners in the village have created a system to manage the distribution of profit, but amateur miners can get involved in building improvised mine shafts that can reach a depth of 30 metres (98 ft). At this depth, the miners face both the danger of collapse and high temperatures. The mines will tackle finds that may stretch for half a mile and this may involve 300 people working together.

Regular work for boys is to carry large quantities of water from the river in plastic jugs so that gold may be extracted. The ore and water are run over sluices which are lined with carpet. The carpet entraps heavier minerals, whilst the water and lighter material are washed away. Traditionally, the gold gathered is evaluated each Friday.

== Health and social problems ==
Unofficial miners have experienced health problems. A likely cause was contact with mercury, as this poisonous metal is used to combine gold dust into larger clumps. The process requires a lot of water, and this waste water then appears in the village's sole drinking water pump.

The village has also attracted prostitution. It has been reported that there has been a large increase in the number of HIV/AIDS sufferers.

The gold boom has attracted the international mining companies Teranga and Bassari. It has been speculated that the country's political stability may be undermined if rich resources are discovered, since traditionally the mining industry of Senegal has been relatively poor.
