= Ndiaga Ndiaye =

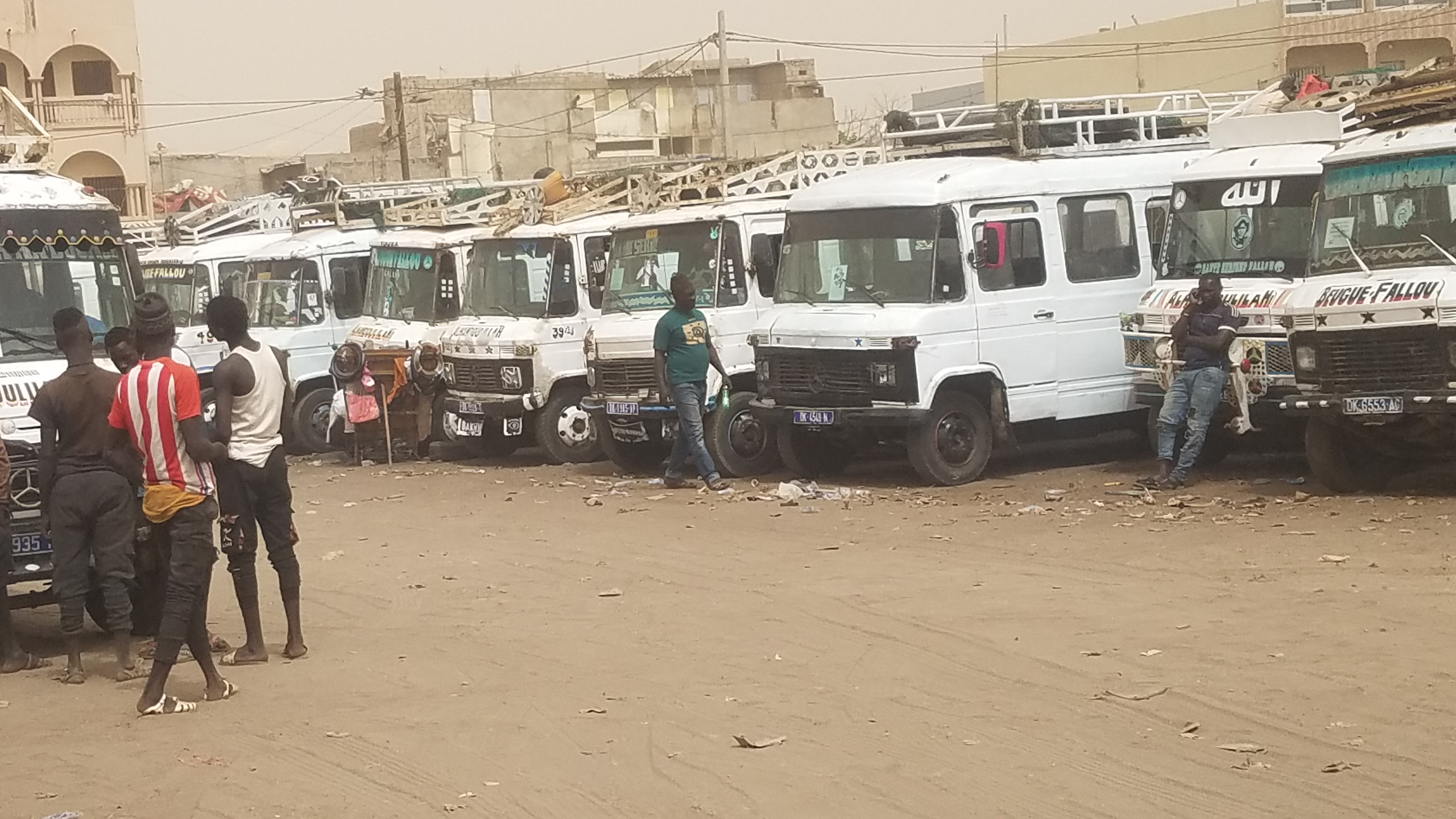

A Ndiaga Ndiaye is a small public bus used in Senegal and the Gambia, generally called Gele-gele in the Gambia, similar to a Ghanaian Tro Tro, a Central America Chicken Bus, or a Haitian Tap Tap. The name is taken from a pioneering mechanic from the Boal region who, beginning in the early 1980s, developed the most common design and owned more than 350 of the buses. By 1986 Ndiaye controlled 90% of interurban transport in Senegal, and was even recruited by the government to provide transportation during a bus drivers' strike. They are commonly used for inter-city transport of people and goods across all of Senegal.

The Ndiaga Ndiaye buses are most commonly Mercedes-Benz 508d Diesel trucks, converted to include bench seating. The outsides are generally painted white, and covered in prayers, Wolof phrases, and silhouettes of holy men. A large cargo rack on the roof may be used to carry personal bags, spare parts, agricultural goods, or livestock. Seating is 5 across, 2 fixed seats on either side the central aisle and a hinged middle seat to allow passage through the vehicle. Up to 3 passengers may be seated in the front passenger seat as well, depending on size and the preferences of the driver. Each vehicle is capable of carrying at least 42 passengers.

Each bus is operated by a driver and at least one apprentice, though many of the buses carry 2 or 3. The apprentice is responsible for collecting passenger fares, loading cargo, and identifying stops. Apprentices generally stand on the rear bumper, holding on to the door or cargo rack while the bus is in motion, signalling stops to the driver by banging on the body panel. Seat prices are generally fixed for a given route, but baggage prices must always be negotiated before boarding.

Citing the aging bus fleet, pollution and danger associated with the vehicles, the Senegalese government attempted, without much success, to replace them with newer Tata buses in 2018. In the aftermath of a deadly accident in January 2022, the government again announced that outdated vehicles would be banned from the road, but enforcing this decree could devastate the Senegalese transportation industry.
