= Corruption in Senegal =

Corruption in Senegal remains a major concern for the nation. On Transparency International's 2025 Corruption Perceptions Index, Senegal scored 46 on a scale from 0 ("highly corrupt") to 100 ("very clean"). When ranked by score, Senegal ranked 65th among the 182 countries in the Index, where the country ranked first is perceived to have the most honest public sector. For comparison with regional scores, the best score among sub-Saharan African countries (Note: Angola, Benin, Botswana, Burkina Faso, Burundi, Cameroon, Cape Verde, Central African Republic, Chad, Comoros, Côte d'Ivoire, Democratic Republic of the Congo, Djibouti, Equatorial Guinea, Eritrea, Eswatini, Ethiopia, Gabon, Gambia, Ghana, Guinea, Guinea-Bissau, Kenya, Lesotho, Liberia, Madagascar, Malawi, Mali, Mauritania, Mauritius, Mozambique, Namibia, Niger, Nigeria, Republic of the Congo, Rwanda, Sao Tome and Principe, Senegal, Seychelles, Sierra Leone, Somalia, South Africa, South Sudan, Sudan, Tanzania, Togo, Uganda, Zambia, and Zimbabwe.) was 68, the average was 32 and the worst was 9. For comparison with worldwide scores, the best score was 89 (ranked 1), the average was 42, and the worst was 9 (ranked 181, in a two-way tie).

== Corruption under Abdoulaye Wade ==
Abdoulaye Wade came to power in 2000, ending 40 years of rule by the Socialist Party. Initially, his election was seen as a positive change, but his administration became associated with significant corruption:

Abdoulaye Wade was involved in corruption scandals, including allegedly handing a suitcase full of cash to a departing IMF representative. Grand corruption, clientelism, and nepotism were evident during Wade's administration. There were accusations of massive embezzlement and misuse of public funds.

Wade's son Karim was given control over major government ministries and projects, leading to allegations of nepotism. Karim gained notoriety for corruption. He was referred to as "Mister 15%" in diplomatic cables, suggesting he took a 15% cut of major government contracts. Eventually, Karim Wade was charged with illegally amassing a fortune of $240 million through embezzlement and corruption. He was prosecuted and sentenced to 6 years in prison with a $228 million fine in 2015.

While Abdoulaye Wade himself has not faced direct legal punishment, his administration's corruption became a focus of investigation under his successor, President Macky Sall.

== Recent Developments ==
Since 2012, under President Macky Sall, Senegal has taken some significant efforts to combat corruption in Senegal, including the establishment of several anti-corruption agencies, such as the Ministry of the Promotion of Good Governance and the reactivated Court of Repression of Economic and Financial Crime. The prosecution of corruption committed by officials has also increased under Sall's administration. However, petty corruption remains common in daily life and public services. There are concerns that anti-corruption measures have been influenced by political considerations. Furthermore, enforcement of anti-corruption laws remains uneven.

Corruption issues persisted under Sall's administration, as there were allegations of nepotism, with Sall appointing family members to government positions. In addition, Sall's brother was implicated in a corruption scandal related to gas field contracts.
