= National Union of Autonomous Trade Unions of Senegal =

UNSAS
- National Union of Autonomous Trade Unions of Senegal
- Union Nationale des Syndicats Autonomes de Sénégal
- Headquarters: Dakar, Senegal
- Location: Senegal
- Key people: Mademba Sock, secretary general
- Affiliations: ITUC

The National Union of Autonomous Trade Unions of Senegal (UNSAS) is a national trade union center in Senegal. It is a federation which includes member unions in electrical, telecommunication, hospital, railroad and sugar workers, and teaching sectors.

The UNSAS is affiliated with the International Trade Union Confederation.
