= Dakar Dem Dikk Workers Democratic Union =

Trade union in Senegal

UDT-3D
- Dakar Dem Dikk Workers Democratic Union
- Union démocratique des travailleurs de Dakar Dem Dikk
- Headquarters: Dakar, Senegal
- Location: Senegal
- Key people: Mamadou Goudiaby, general secretary
- Affiliations: CNTS

Dakar Dem Dikk Workers Democratic Union (Union démocratique des travailleurs de Dakar Dem Dikk, UDT-3D) is a trade union of employees of Dakar Dem Dikk (the public transportation network of Dakar, Senegal). The general secretary of UDT-3D is Mamadou Goudiaby. Another important leader and negotiator of the union is Christian Salvy. UDT-3D is affiliated to CNTS/FC.
