= Falémé mine =

Iron ore mine in Kédougou Region, Senegal

Falémé iron ore deposits
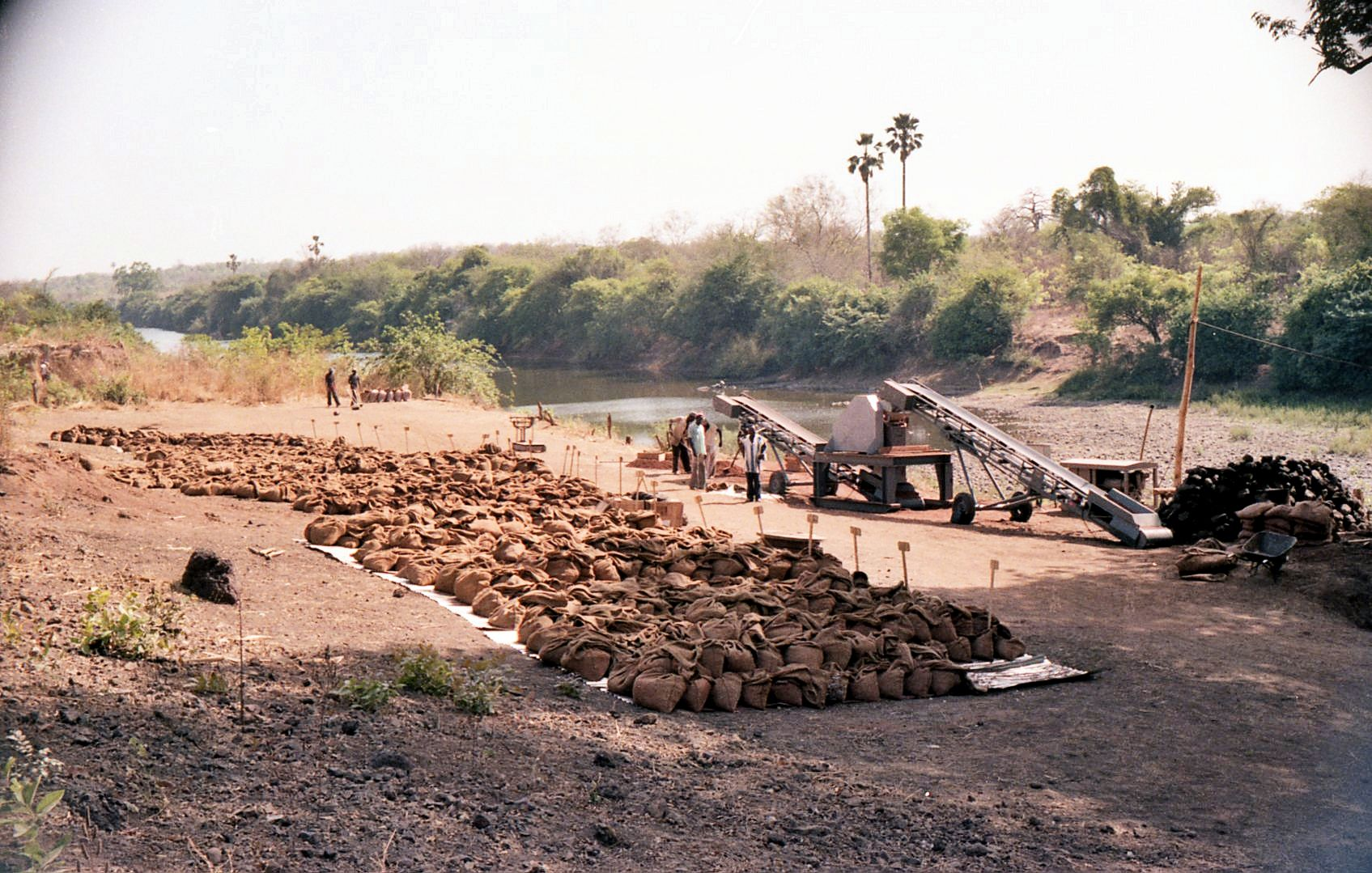
- Location: Kédougou Region, Senegal
- Active: 1962 - 1982

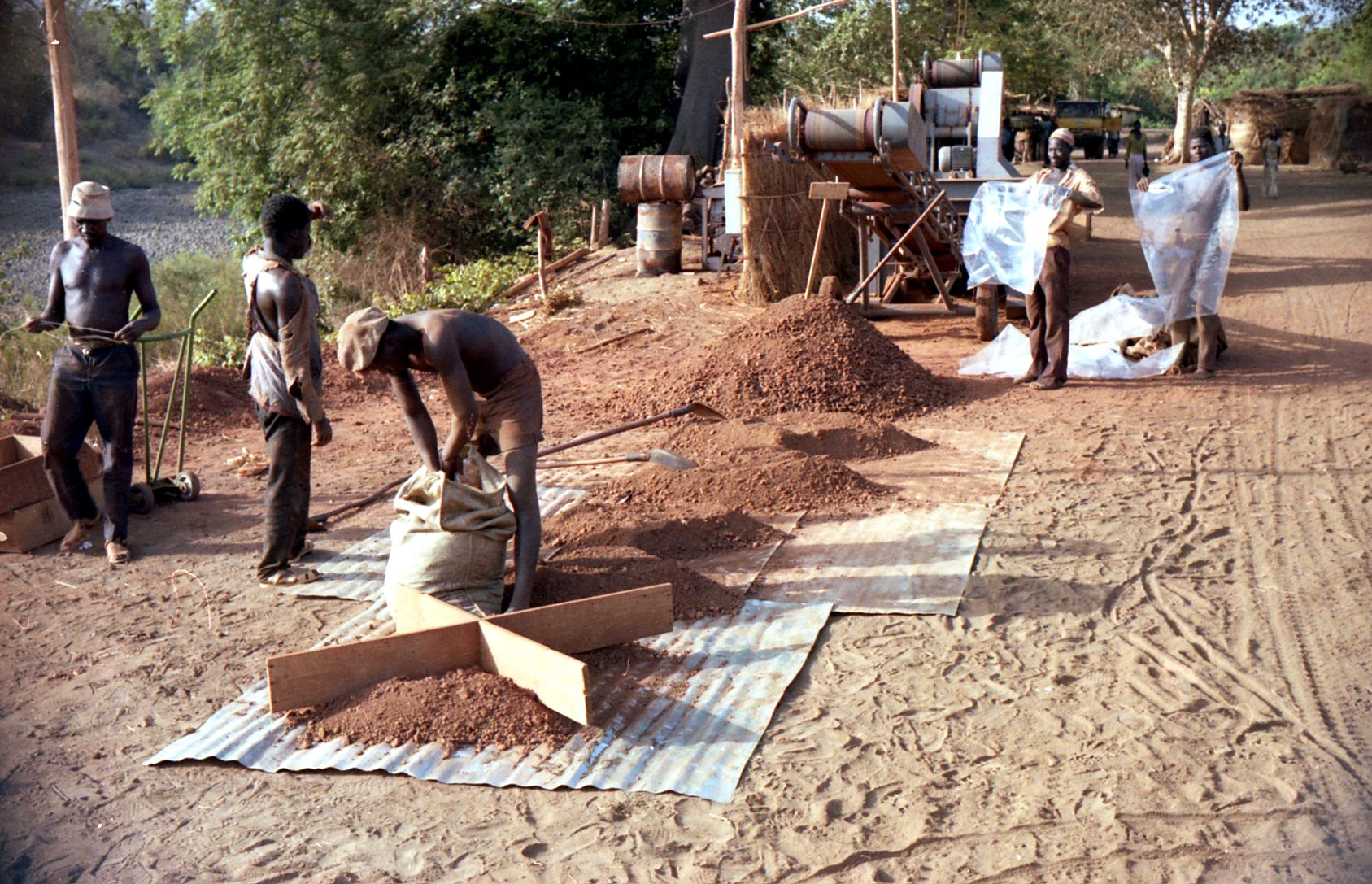
Faleme (1980)

The Falémé iron ore deposits (French: Gisements de minerai de fer de Falémé) are located in south-east Senegal in the Kédougou Region. Several deposits of primary Magnetite and high-grade oxide ores have been explored. The proved, minable reserves amount to 260 million tons of coarse-grained magnetite with an average Fe-content of 45% and 340 million tons of oxide ore with an average Fe-content of 59%.
