= Leucoxene =

Leucoxene is a fine granular alteration product of titanium minerals. It varies in color from yellow to brown.

It consists mainly of rutile or anatase. It is observed in some igneous rocks and iron ore deposits as the result of the alteration of ilmenite, perovskite, or titanite.
