= Democratic Union of Senegalese Workers =

Trade union in Senegal

UDTS
- Democratic Union of Senegalese Workers
- Union Démocratique des Travailleurs de Sénégal
- Headquarters: Dakar, Senegal
- Location: Senegal
- Key people: Sow Alioune, secretary general
- Affiliations: ITUC

The Democratic Union of Senegalese Workers (UDTS) is a trade union in Senegal. It is affiliated with the International Trade Union Confederation.

== About ==
The UDTS is a large independent union. According to the United States Embassy, it has approximately 6,000 workers in the fields of transportation, security, and fisheries/canning industries.
