= List of ambassadors of Romania to the United Kingdom =

Coordinates: 51.504146°N 0.189875°W

Ambassador of Romania to the United Kingdom
- Ambasadorul României la Londra
- Coat of arms of Romania

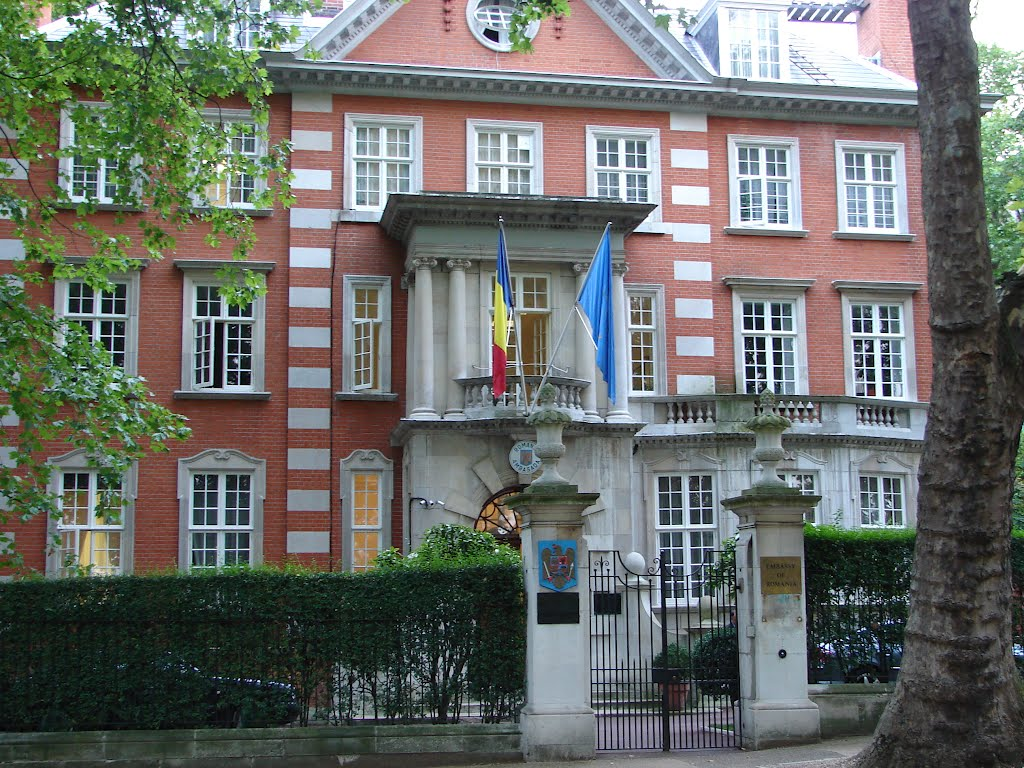
- Incumbent; Dan Mihalache since June 8, 2016
- Inaugural holder: Nicolae Calimachi-Catargiu
- Formation: November 28, 1869

The Romanian Ambassador to the Court of St James's is the official representative of the Government in Bucharest to the Government in London (United Kingdom and Northern Ireland). Between 1869-1963 his official title was of plenipotentiary ministry and since 1963 of extraordinary and plenipotentiary ambassador.

== List of ambassadors ==
Diplomatic agrément/Diplomatic accreditation	Ambassador	Observations	List of heads of state of Romania	List of prime ministers of the United Kingdom	Term end
November 28, 1869	Nicolae Calimachi-Catargiu		Carol I of Romania	William Ewart Gladstone	March 11, 1871
May 4, 1880	Nicolae Calimachi-Catargiu		Carol I of Romania	William Ewart Gladstone	July 1, 1881
July 1, 1881	Ion Ghica		Carol I of Romania	William Ewart Gladstone	March 1, 1891
March 1, 1891	Alexandru Plagino		Carol I of Romania	Robert Gascoyne-Cecil, 3rd Marquess of Salisbury	March 31, 1893
March 31, 1893	Ion Bălăceanu		Carol I of Romania	William Ewart Gladstone	December 1, 1900
December 1, 1900	Alexandru C. Catargi		Carol I of Romania	Robert Gascoyne-Cecil, 3rd Marquess of Salisbury	October 13, 1911
November 1, 1911	Gheorghe Manu	Constantin G. Manu	Carol I of Romania	H. H. Asquith	December 5, 1912
December 5, 1912	Nicolae Mişu		Carol I of Romania	H. H. Asquith	October 15, 1919
December 16, 1921	Nicolae Titulescu		Ferdinand I of Romania	David Lloyd George	July 6, 1927
August 1, 1928	Nicolae Titulescu		Michael I of Romania	Stanley Baldwin	October 20, 1932
August 29, 1936	Nicolae Titulescu		Carol II of Romania	Stanley Baldwin	November 1, 1936
November 1, 1936	Vasile Grigorcea	Basile Grigorcea	Carol II of Romania	Stanley Baldwin	November 20, 1938
1936	Matila Ghyka	ministrul	Carol II of Romania	Stanley Baldwin	1938
February 2, 1939	Viorel Tilea		Carol II of Romania	Neville Chamberlain	1940
1939	Matila Ghyka		Carol II of Romania	Neville Chamberlain	1940
1940	Radu Florescu	Chargé d'affaires	Michael I of Romania	Winston Churchill	
1946	Richard Franasovici		Michael I of Romania	Clement Attlee	1947
1947	George Macovescu		Constantin Ion Parhon	Clement Attlee	1949
1947	Nicolai Cioroiu		Constantin Ion Parhon	Clement Attlee	1952
1953	Pavel Babuci		Petru Groza	Winston Churchill	1956
1956	Nicolai Korcinski		Petru Groza	Anthony Eden	1957
1957	Petre Balaceanu		Petru Groza	Harold Macmillan	1961
1961	Alexandru Lăzăreanu		Gheorghe Gheorghiu-Dej	Harold Macmillan	1964
1964	Alexandru Lăzăreanu	Ambassador Extraordinary and Plenipotentiary	Gheorghe Gheorghiu-Dej	Harold Wilson	1966
1966	Vasile Pungan		Chivu Stoica	Harold Wilson	1972
1972	Pretor Popa		Nicolae Ceaușescu	Edward Heath	1980
1980	Vasile Gliga		Nicolae Ceaușescu	Margaret Thatcher	1986
1986	Stan Soare		Nicolae Ceaușescu	Margaret Thatcher	January 13, 1990
1990	Sergiu Celac		Ion Iliescu	John Major	1996
June 13, 2001	Radu Onofrei		Ion Iliescu	Tony Blair	
November 29, 2002	Dan Ghibernea		Ion Iliescu	Tony Blair	July 18, 2006
2008	Ion Jinga		Traian Băsescu	Gordon Brown	2015
September 11, 2015	Mihnea Motoc		Klaus Iohannis	David Cameron	November 17, 2015
June 8, 2016	Dan Mihalache		Klaus Iohannis	David Cameron	

- United Kingdom–Romania relations
- Embassy of Romania, London
