= Antonio Pedro =

Antonio Pedro may refer to:

- António Pedro (1909–1966), Portuguese painter, potter, journalist and writer
- Antônio Pedro (1940–2023), Brazilian actor, comedian, stage director and playwright
- Antônio Pedro de Siqueira Indio da Costa (born 1970), Brazilian lawyer and politician
- Antonio Pedro Monteiro Lima (born 1948), Cape Verdean diplomat
- Antonio Pedro Sancho Dávila y Osorio (d. 1689), Spanish noble, soldier, politician and diplomat
- Antonio Tabet (born 1974), Brazilian advertising, scriptwriter and comedian
- António-Pedro Vasconcelos (1939–2024), Portuguese film director

== See also ==
- António Simões (executive) (born 1975), Portuguese financial services executive
- Carmona Rodrigues (born 1956), Portuguese politician and professor
- Toni Lopes (born 1979), Portuguese professional footballer
