= Permanent Representative of Romania to the United Nations =

Diplomatic post in charge of representing Romania in the United Nations

- Reprezentant Permanent al României la Organizația Națiunilor Unite

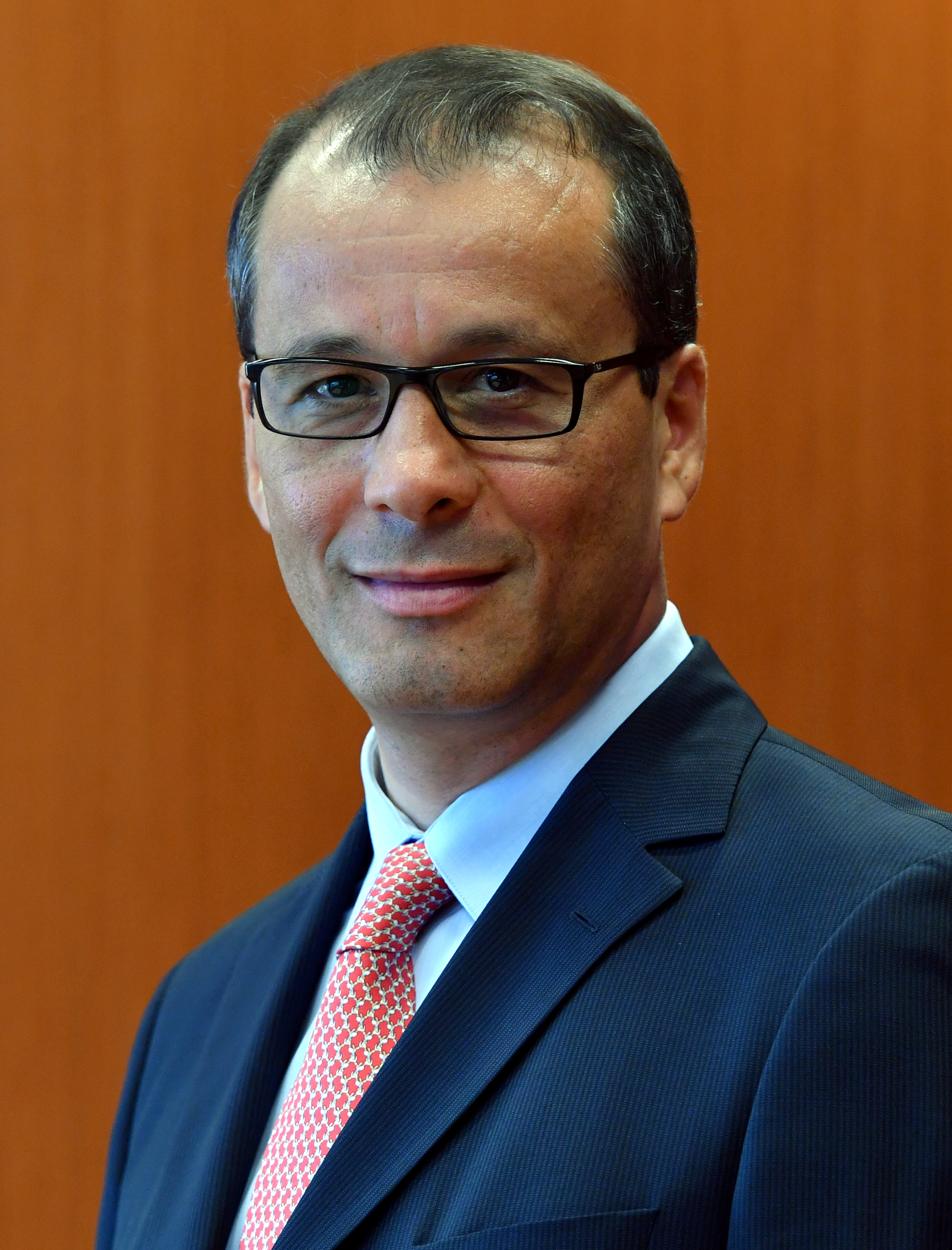
- Incumbent; Cornel Feruță since 16 September 2022
- Formation: 14 December 1955

The Permanent Representative of Romania to the United Nations (Romanian: Reprezentant Permanent al României la Organizația Națiunilor Unite) is currently Cornel Feruță since 16 September 2022. Romania joined the United Nations (UN) on 14 December 1955.

The first person with the diplomatic post was Athanase Joja, who was already appointed with it in 1955. However, Joja and the official Romanian diplomatic delegation for the UN would not arrive in New York City until 20 March 1956. The persons that have been the Permanent Representative of Romania to the United Nations have been the following:

1. Athanase Joja (1955–1957)
2. Mihai Magheru (1957–1959)
3. Silviu Brucan (1959–1961)
4. Mihai Haseganu (1961–1966)
5. Gheorghe Diaconescu (1966–1971)
6. Ion Datcu (1972–1978)
7. Teodor Marinescu (1978–1986)
8. Petre Tanasie (1987–1990)
9. Aurel Dragoș Munteanu (1990–1992)
10. Mihai Horia Botez (1992–1994)
11. Ion Goriță (1994–2000)
12. Sorin Ducaru (2000–2001)
13. Alexandru Niculescu (2001–2003)
14. Mihnea Motoc (2003–2008)
15. Simona Miculescu (2008–2015)
16. Ion Jinga (2015–2022)
17. Cornel Feruță (2022–present)

== See also ==
- Romania and the United Nations
- Permanent Representative of Moldova to the United Nations
