= Romania and the United Nations =

Romania

United Nations membership
- Represented by: Romanian People's Republic (1955–1965); Socialist Republic of Romania (1965–1989); Romania (1989–present)
- Membership: Full member
- Since: 14 December 1955
- UNSC seat: Non-permanent
- Permanent Representative: Ion Jinga

Romania (then the Romanian People's Republic) joined the United Nations (UN) on 14 December 1955 following the adoption of the United Nations Security Council Resolution 109. Romania had already attempted to join the UN on 1947, but its membership application was rejected after the adoption of the United Nations Security Council Resolution 29.

Currently, the Permanent Representative of Romania to the United Nations since 4 August 2015 is Ion Jinga, who has also been president of several institutions of the UN. Jinga has highlighted Romania's role in the UN, declaring that Romania is "active, highly respected, remarkable in UN peacekeeping missions". Romania has participated since 1991 in UN peacekeeping missions and was part of those of Iraq and Kuwait, Afghanistan, Haiti and more.

Apart from resolutions 29 and 109, there also was the United Nations Security Council Resolution 992 related to Romania, in which the latter was asked to monitor the use of locks in the Danube River and inspect ships and their cargo if necessary.

In 2009, the International Court of Justice (ICJ), one of the main organs of the UN, arbitrated a case in which Romania was involved. The roots of this case were due to a treaty between Romania and Ukraine in which it was specified that both countries had to define a maritime boundary between them. However, negotiations between both failed, so the issue was brought to the ICJ, which in the end gave Romania 80% of the disputed maritime area.

== See also ==
- Moldova and the United Nations
