= Wenaweser =

Wenaweser is a surname. Notable people with the surname include:

- Christian Wenaweser (born 1963), Liechtenstein diplomat
- Christoph Wenaweser (born 1963), Liechtenstein politician
