= Marta Žiaková =

Slovak state official and diplomat

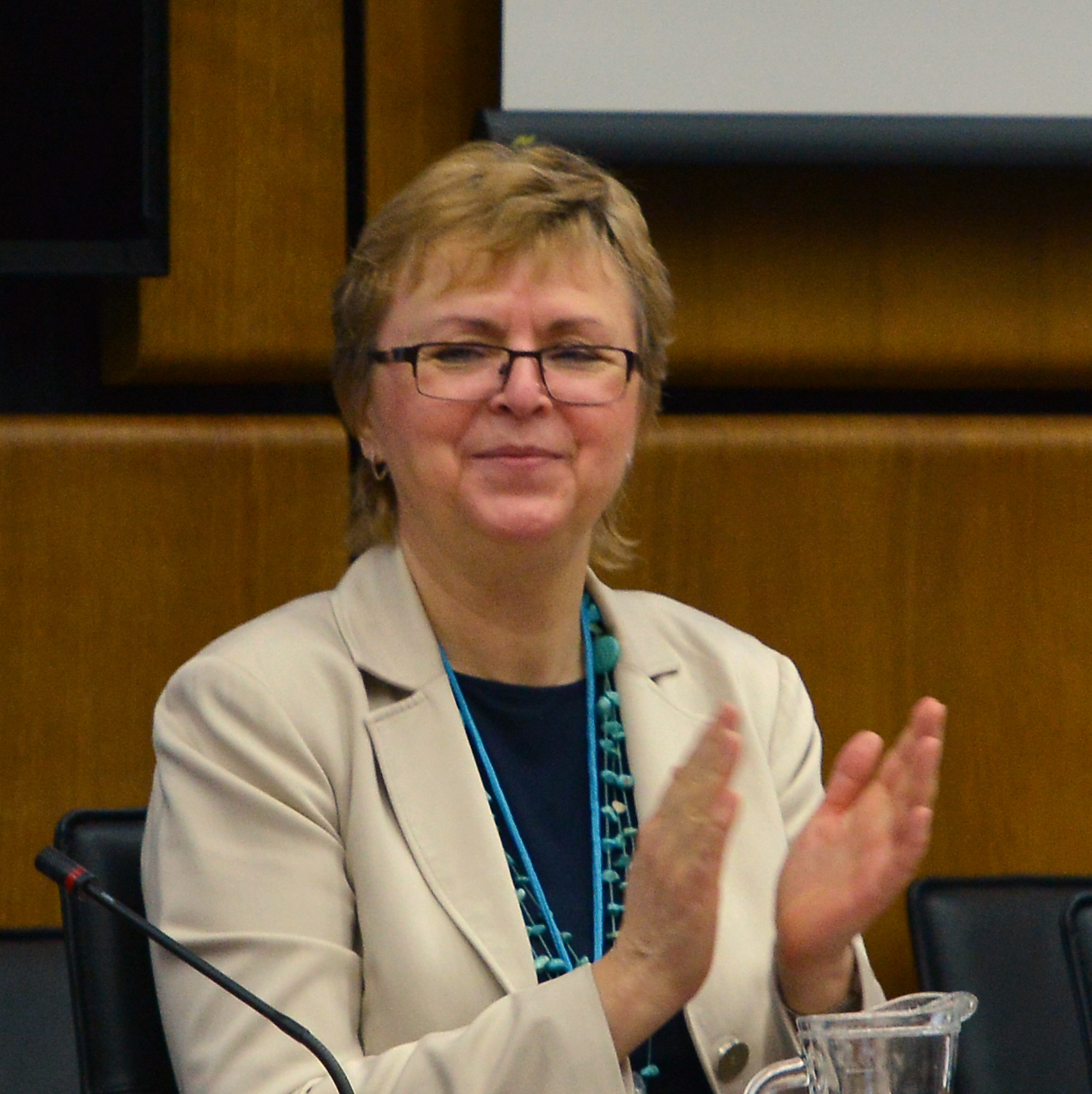
- Žiaková in 2014

Chairperson of the Nuclear Regulatory Authority of the Slovak Republic
- Incumbent
- Assumed office 28 March 2002
- Prime Minister: Mikuláš Dzurinda; Robert Fico; Iveta Radičová; Robert Fico; Peter Pellegrini; Igor Matovič
- Preceded by: Miroslav Lipár

62nd President of the International Atomic Energy Agency General Conference
- In office 17 September 2018 – 21 September 2018
- Preceded by: Maria Zeneida Angara Collinson
- Succeeded by: Alicia Buenrostro Massieu

61st Chairperson of the Board of Governors of International Atomic Energy Agency
- In office 2014–2015
- Preceded by: Thiep Nguyen
- Succeeded by: Laércio Antonio Vinhas

Personal details
- Born: 23 November 1955 (age 70) Handlová, Czechoslovakia
- Citizenship: Slovak
- Party: independent
- Education: Slovak University of Technology in Bratislava
- Occupation: nuclear scientist, diplomat, state official
- Portfolio: nuclear energy, regulatory activities

Ing. Marta Žiaková, CSc. (born 23 November 1955) is a Slovak state official, diplomat and scientist in the field of nuclear energy. Since 2002 she serves as the chairperson of Nuclear Regulatory Authority of the Slovak Republic (ÚJD SR). She ran for the position of IAEA Director General in 2019.

== Early life and career ==
Marta Žiaková was born on 23 November 1955, in Handlová in at that time Czechoslovakia. During 1974–1979 she has studied at the Faculty of Electrical Engineering and Information Technology of the Slovak University of Technology in Bratislava, graduating in specialization of Technical Cybernetics – Automation Technology. She vindicated her scientific degree, PhD., at the same university in the area of technical cybernetics in 1984.

In 1984 she started to work in VUJE – Research Institute of Nuclear Energy in Trnava. During the 1980s and 1990s she has completed various further expert trainings and internships at VUJE, Slovak University of Technology in Bratislava, PHARE, in Karlsruhe or in General Physics. Between 1995 and 2002 Žiaková held several managing positions in Training centre for preparing of the nuclear personnel of VUJE in Trnava- There she was managing several projects.

Concurrently, she has been working as an expert for the International Atomic Energy Agency (IAEA) in Vienna for the training of the personnel as a part of projects of technical cooperation, for example in Hungary or Iran. She is regularly being invited as an expert for the IAEA working groups (AGM) and is a member of Slovak Nuclear Society and Women in Nuclear associations.

On 28 March 2002, she has been on the proposal of Minister of Economy of Slovakia, Ľubomír Harach, appointed by a Government of Slovak Republic for the position of the Chairperson of the Nuclear Regulatory Authority of the Slovak Republic, succeeding Miroslav Lipár. She is the longest serving chairperson of ÚJD SR in the history of Slovakia, having served during seven different governments.

=== International experience ===
Marta Žiaková as a chairwoman of ÚJD SR has represented Slovakia in a variety of international fora. Between 2004 and 2006 and 2013–2015 she was a member of Board of Governors of the IAEA, while between years 2014–2015 she was chairing the board. Between 2012 and 2016 she has been a member of International Nuclear Safety Group (INSAG).

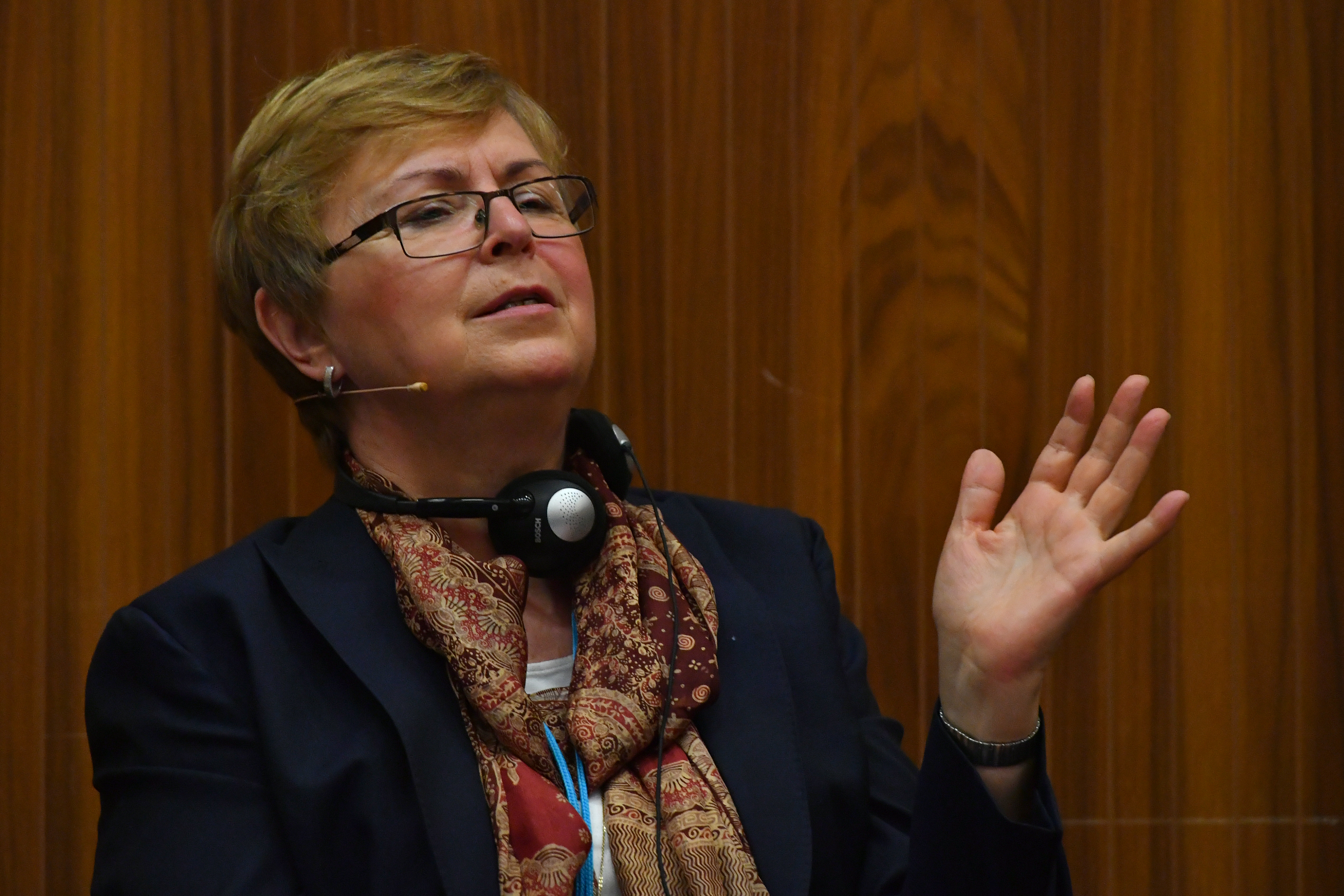
Žiaková in 2019

In 2018, while supported by Eastern European Group, Žiaková has been elected as the President of the 62nd IAEA General Conference. In March 2019 Žiaková has been elected as the Chair of ENSREG Group uniting EU nuclear regulators. In the OECD Nuclear Energy Agency, Žiaková was since 2011 vice-chairperson and since 2016 she is a chairperson of the OECD NEA Steering Committee for Nuclear Energy.

=== IAEA Director General Candidacy ===
On 5 September 2019, the Slovak ministry of foreign affairs announced that Žiaková as a candidate of SLovakia is running for the position of the Director General, vacant after the premature demise of Yukiya Amano of Japan. Her competitors were three candidates from Argentina (Rafael Grossi), Burkina Faso (Lassina Zerbo) and Romania (Cornel Feruță). On 30 October 2019, the Board of Governors of the IAEA appointed Rafael Grossi as the sixth Director General of the IAEA.

== Personal life ==
Marta Žiaková is single and childless, she lives in Trnava. She speaks Slovak, Czech, English and Russian.
