= Martha Ama Akyaa Pobee =

Ghanaian diplomat

Her Excellency Martha Ama Akyaa Pobee
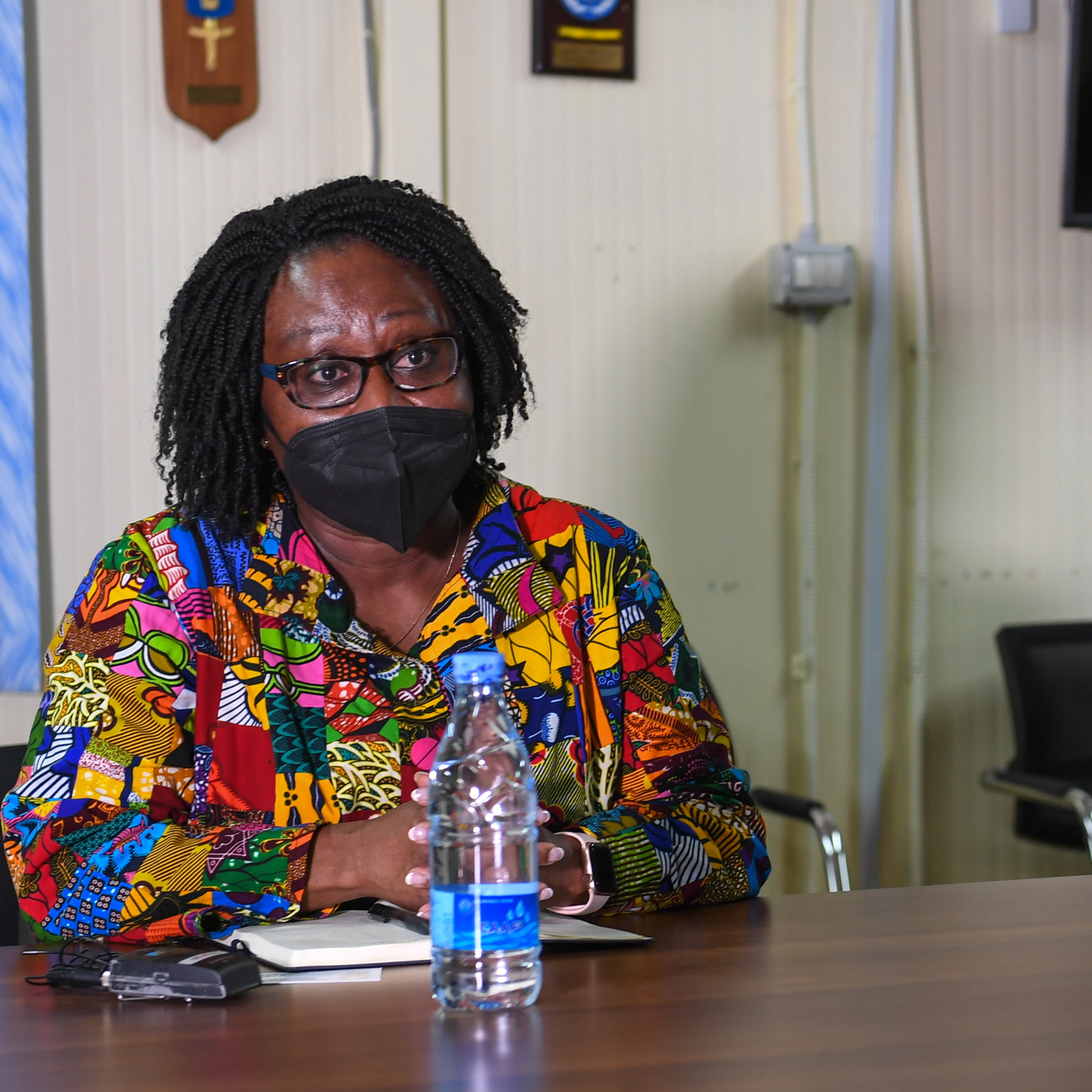
- in November 2021 in Mogadishu

14th Ghana Permanent Representative to the United Nations
- In office July 2015 – May 2021
- President: John Dramani Mahama
- Preceded by: Ken Kanda

Personal details
- Born: September 4
- Spouse: John Samuel Pobee
- Education: University of Ghana; International Institute of Social Studies; Graduate Institute of International and Development Studies; Ghana Institute of Management and Public Administration
- Occupation: Diplomat

Martha Ama Akyaa Pobee (born 4 September) is a Ghanaian diplomat who served as Assistant Secretary-General of the United Nations for Africa at the United Nations Secretariat from 2021 to 2026. In this capacity, she was part of the United Nations Department of Political and Peacebuilding Affairs.

Before joining the UN, Pobee was Ghana's first female permanent representative to the United Nations. She was appointed in July 2015 by the former president John Dramani Mahama. As the assistant secretary-general of the United Nations for Africa in the Departments of Political and Peace Operations, she gave remarks to the security council in November 2023.

== Early life and education ==
Pobee obtained her bachelor's degree in English and philosophy from the University of Ghana and her master's degree in development studies from the International Institute of Social Studies in The Hague. She also obtained a diploma in multilateral diplomacy at the Graduate Institute of International and Development Studies (IHEID) and Public Administration at the Ghana Institute of Management and Public Administration (GIMPA).

== Career ==
Pobee was a career diplomat, serving in the Ministry for Foreign Affairs. She was posted in Tel Aviv from 2000 until 2004. She was Head of Chancery at the Ghanaian Embassy in Washington D.C. from 2006 until 2010.

From 2010 to 2012, Pobee was the director of the Information and Public Affairs Bureau at the Ministry for Foreign Affairs. She later became the deputy head of mission at the Ghana High Commission in Pretoria from 2012 until her appointment as Ghana's permanent representative to the UN by President John Dramani Mahama in July 2015.

== Personal life ==
Pobee was married to John Samuel Pobee, an Anglican priest and emeritus professor. The ceremony took place at the University of Ghana on 26 July 1994. She is a Roman Catholic.
