= Ken Kanda =

His Excellency Ken Kanda

13th Ghana Permanent Representative to the United Nations
- In office 2011–2015
- President: John Atta Mills
- Preceded by: Leslie Christian
- Succeeded by: Martha Ama Akyaa Pobee

Vice-President of the Assembly of States Parties of the International Criminal Court
- In office 2011–2014
- Appointed by: Assembly of States Parties
- Preceded by: Simona Miculescu
- Succeeded by: Sebastiano Cardi

Personal details
- Born: August 30, 1951 (age 74) Kpandu, Ghana
- Children: 4 daughters
- Education: University of Ghana
- Occupation: Diplomat

Ken Kanda is a Ghanaian diplomat. He was the Permanent Representative of Ghana to the United Nations and succeeded by Martha Ama Akyaa Pobee in 2015.

== Early life and education ==
Kanda was born at Kpandu in the Volta Region of Ghana. He attended Aggrey Memorial A.M.E. Zion Senior High School. He later obtained a Bachelor of Arts degree in 1975 from the University of Ghana where he studied Political science and Modern history. He also received a graduate diploma in international studies three years later. He was also a Hubert Humphrey Fellow at the Woodrow Wilson School of Public and International Affairs, Princeton University, New Jersey, United States.

== Career ==
Kanda entered the Ghanaian foreign service in 1976 and served in various capacities in places including Copenhagen and Bonn. He was Protocol Officer to the Vice President of Ghana John Atta Mills between 1997 and 1998. He then held various positions within the Ghana foreign service both within and outside Ghana till 2009 when he became Director of State Protocol. He continued in this post till his current appointment to the United Nations. He was appointed in 2011 by President Mills.

From 2011 to 2014 Kanda was a Vice-President of the Assembly of States Parties of the International Criminal Court.

== Family ==
Kanda is married with four daughters.

== Awards and recognition ==
Kanda was awarded by the Global Awareness Society International for contributing to Global Understanding and World Peace.

Diplomatic posts
Preceded by Simona Miculescu	Vice-President of the Assembly of States Parties of the International Criminal Court; 2011 – 2014	Succeeded by Sebastiano Cardi
Preceded by Leslie Christian	Permanent Representative to the United Nations; 2011 – 2015	Succeeded by Martha Ama Akyaa Pobee
