= Dan Mihalache =

Romanian politician

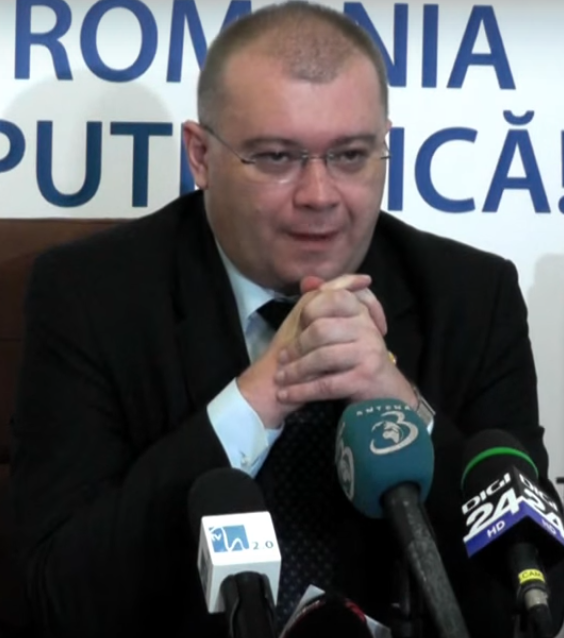

Romanian Ambassador to the United Kingdom
- Incumbent
- Assumed office 8 June 2016
- Preceded by: Mihnea Motoc
- Succeeded by: Laura Popescu

Personal details
- Born: Sorin Dan Mihalache; 18 May 1971 (age 55) Timișoara, Romania
- Party: Social Democratic Party
- Spouse: Mădălina Mihalache
- Education: University of Bucharest
- Website: Official website

Sorin Dan Mihalache (born 18 May 1971 in Timișoara) is a Romanian politician and former Member of the European Parliament. He is a member of the Social Democratic Party, part of the Party of European Socialists, became an MEP on 1 January 2007 with the accession of Romania to the European Union and he serves as the Ambassador of Romania to the United Kingdom of Great Britain and Northern Ireland since 8 June 2016. He started his career as a journalist after graduating from Bucharest University Law School.

== Political career ==
Between 2004 and 2008, Mr. Mihalache served a complete term as Member of the Romanian Chamber of Deputies, while in 2006 and 2007 he held a seat as Observer and then as Member of the European Parliament (MEP).

Other public positions include Secretary General of the Romanian Senate (2013–2014), Deputy Secretary General of the Romanian Government (2012), Adviser to the Romanian Prime Minister (2001–2004).

Mr. Mihalache was the President's chief of staff – Head of Presidential Chancellery and the Head of Presidential Administration since December 2014, immediately after the election of Klaus Iohannis as President of Romania – and one of Klaus Iohannis' closest advisors after he became president.

On 8 June 2016 Klaus Iohannis signed the presidential decree appointing Dan Mihalache as the Ambassador of Romania to the Court of St. James's, although voices from the Civil society expressed concern with Mihalache's appointment.

== Controversy ==
In 2012 Dan Mihalache was discharged from the role as the Deputy Secretary General of the Romanian Government by the Prime Minister Victor Ponta as a result of Mihalache's comments regarding the warning raised by the Ambassador to Romania, Mark Gitenstein, against any modifications to the Romania's National Integrity Agency's law (whose main task is to ensure the performance of public dignities and positions in conditions of impartiality, integrity and transparency), which the Ambassador said could lead to a new set of discussions or even cancelling a proposed Romanian-American Strategic Partnership; Mihalache declared in an interview that he is not worried about the ambassador's warning and suggested that it may be better if the partnership didn't happen, considering who the director of Romania's National Integrity Agency is, leading to his dismissal by the prime minister. He later claimed that his declarations were taken out of context.

In 2015 presidential adviser Dan Mihalache was caught on camera sleeping while waiting for the meeting between President Klaus Iohannis and his Serbian counterpart to end. The photo of Mihalache sleeping in a chair at the meeting table has become viral. Mihalache claimed he was not sleeping and it was a manipulation of the public by the tabloid media while president Klaus Iohannis declared that it was a poor attempt to discredit his team.
