= Dinicu Golescu National College =

- Colegiul Național Dinicu Golescu
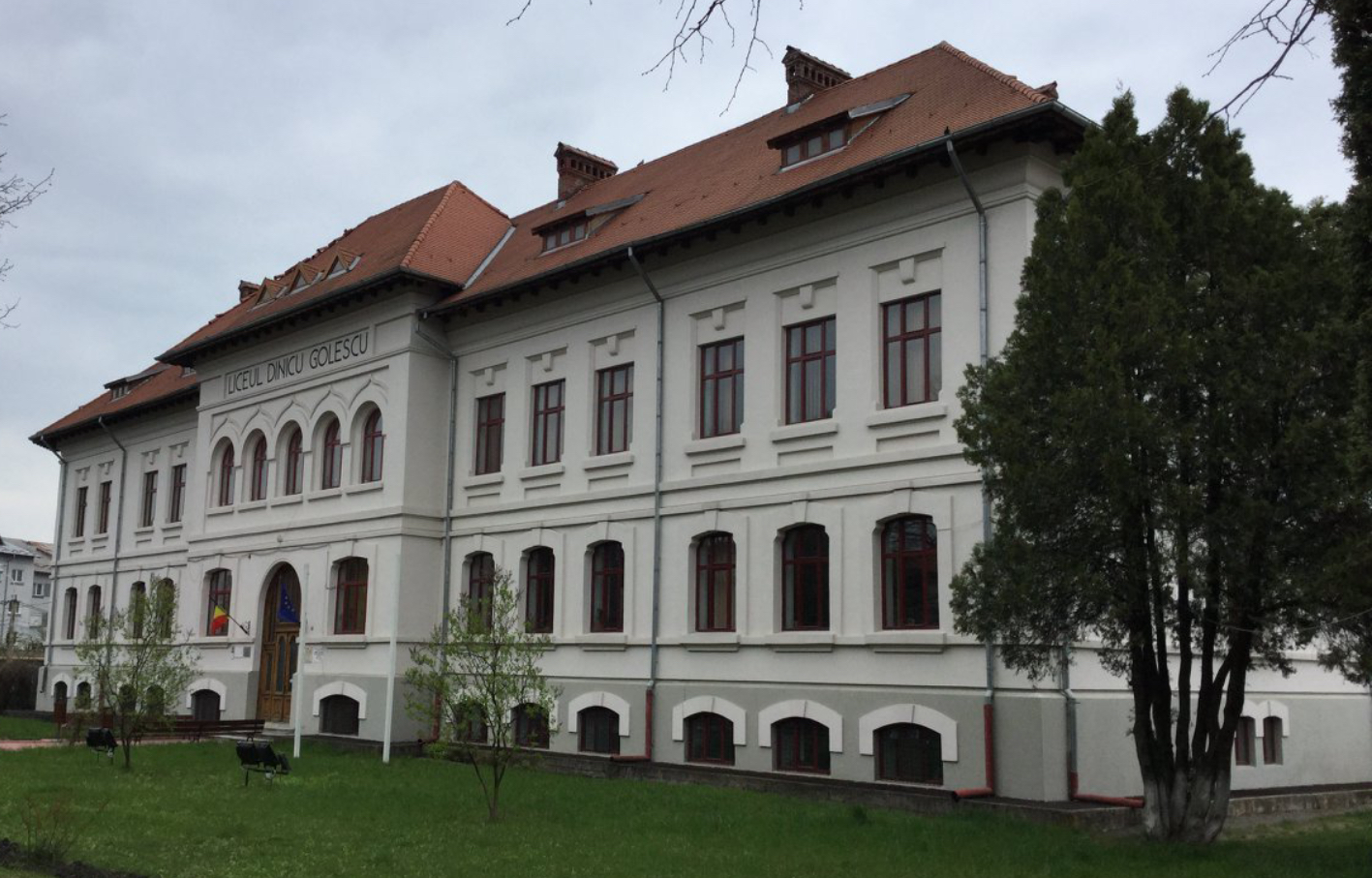

Location
- Strada Negru Vodă, Nr. 66; Câmpulung, Argeș County; Romania
- Coordinates: 45°15′52.2″N 25°2′25.76″E

Information
- Established: 1 September 1894; 131 years ago
- Principal: Prof. dr. Maria Magdalena Dorcioman
- Website: www.dinicugolescu.ro

Dinicu Golescu National College (Romanian: Colegiul Național Dinicu Golescu) is a high school located at 66 Negru Vodă Street, Câmpulung, Romania.

When it opened in September 1894, the school was the first secondary institution in Câmpulung. From that point until 1917, it operated as a science and humanities gymnasium, producing 380 graduates over the years. Initially featuring two grades, two more were added in 1896. It was named after boyar Dinicu Golescu in 1898.

The school closed during World War I, reopening as a high school in 1920. The current building was begun in 1925 and completed in 1937. Starting with the 1920–1921 year, the school offered special classes for paying pupils. Between 1921 and 1948, the school had 747 graduates across 26 classes.

After the new communist regime imposed an education reform in 1948, the school underwent various changes, including the dropping of the Golescu name, the admission of girls and a reduction to ten, followed by eleven grades. The school was again dedicated to Golescu in 1958. It became an industrial high school in 1982, lasting until 1990, after the Romanian Revolution. In 2001, it was declared a national college.

The school building is listed as a historic monument by Romania's Ministry of Culture and Religious Affairs.

== Notable alumni ==
- Ion Jinga
- Stan Nițu
