= UNRocks =

UNRocks is a band made up of diplomats of the United Nations including Simona Miculescu (Romania), Guillermo Rishchynski (Canada), Antonio Pedro Monteiro Lima (Cape Verde), Eduardo Ulibarri (Costa Rica), and Marlene Moses (Nauru). The band collaborates with award-winning composer Gary Fry.

== History ==
In 2012, Her Excellency, Simona Miculescu, former Romanian Ambassador to the United Nations, founded a band with fellow diplomats and musicians, H.E. Guillermo Rishchynski (Canada), H.E. Antonio Pedro Monteiro Lima (Cape Verde), Eduardo Ulibarri (Costa Rica), and H.E. Marlene Moses (Nauru), representing Europe, North America, Africa, Latin America, Asia and the Pacific Islands. In September 2013, the band released their first album, “Ambassadors Sing for Peace,“ with arrangements and artistic direction by Emmy Award-winning composer Gary Fry, and support from the SAE Institute. The debut album includes covers of iconic songs including “What a Wonderful World,” “Heal the World,” and “Imagine.”

In 2015, the band was officially named UNRocks, consisting of H.E. Simona Miculescu (lead singer), Ambassador Ib Petersen of Denmark (guitar), Ambassador Oh Joon of the Republic of Korea (drums), Ambassador Milan Milanovic of Serbia (guitar) and Ambassador Virachai Plasai of Thailand (guitar and keyboard). In December 2015, in commemoration of the United Nations 70th Anniversary, they released a new single, “Strong UN, Better World,” and recorded a new cover of Status Quo’s “Rockin' All Over the World,” with artistic direction from award winning composer Gary Fry.
