= Bruno Stagno Ugarte =

Costa Rican political scientist and diplomat (born 1970)

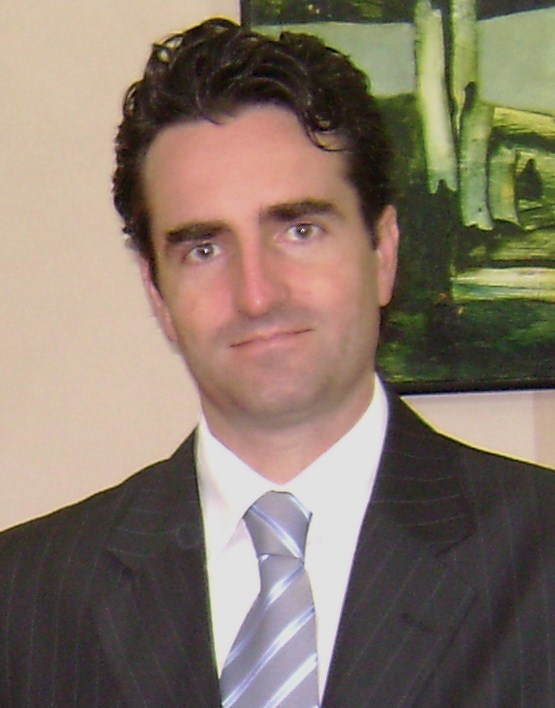
- Stagno in 2007

Minister of Foreign Affairs and Worship
- In office 8 May 2006 – 8 May 2010
- President: Óscar Arias Sánchez
- Preceded by: Roberto Tovar Faja
- Succeeded by: Rene Castro Salazar

President of the Assembly of States Parties of the International Criminal Court
- In office 9 September 2004 – 13 December 2007
- Appointed by: Assembly of States Parties
- Preceded by: Zeid bin Ra'ad
- Succeeded by: Christian Wenaweser

Permanent Representative to the United Nations
- In office 8 May 2002 – 8 May 2006
- President: Abel Pacheco de la Espriella
- Preceded by: Bernd H. Niehaus Quesada
- Succeeded by: Jorge Urbina Ortega

Personal details
- Born: Bruno Stagno Ugarte; 8 April 1970 (age 56) Paris, France
- Party: Independent
- Parent(s): Bruno Stagno; Jimena Ugarte
- Education: Princeton University; Georgetown University; University of Paris

Bruno Stagno Ugarte (born 8 April 1970) is a Costa Rican political scientist and diplomat who served as Minister of Foreign Affairs from 2006 to 2010. He also served as the president of the Assembly of States Parties of the International Criminal Court (ICC) from 2005 to 2008 and co-president of the Comprehensive Test Ban Treaty Organization conference, among other roles at the multilateral level.

== Early life and education ==
Born in Paris, Stagno has academic degrees from Princeton University, Georgetown University, and the University of Paris.

== Career ==
Stagno served as Costa Rica's Ambassador-Permanent Representative to the United Nations in New York from 9 September 2002 to 7 May 2006, where he was among other tasks designated Vice-President of the negotiations leading to the 2005 United Nations Summit Outcome Document and elected Vice-President of the Commission on Sustainable Development, In 2004, he succeeded Jordan's Zeid Ra'ad Zeid Al-Hussein and became the second president of the Assembly of States Parties of the ICC. Stagno's term at the ICC expired in 2007, and he was succeeded by Christian Wenaweser of Liechtenstein.

Stagno became the Minister of Foreign Affairs of Costa Rica on 8 May 2006 and served for a full four-year term under President and Nobel Peace Prize laureate Óscar Arias Sánchez. He established diplomatic relations with 21 countries and led Costa Rica's participation as a Non-Permanent Member of the Security Council in 2008-2009 as well as negotiations for free trade agreements, and related agreements, with China (2008) and the European Union (2010).

== Other activities ==
Stagno is an Affiliate Professor at the Paris School of International Affairs (PSIA), as well as a Member of its Strategic Committee and Scientific Committee. He is an Officier de la Legion d'Honneur (France).

Stagno is Deputy Executive Director at Human Rights Watch, responsible for Global Advocacy, and sits on numerous boards and advisory groups, including the Carter Center, Crisis Action, Global Center for the Responsibility to Protect, International Service for Human Rights, among others.
