= Mihnea Motoc =

Romanian diplomat

H.E. Ambassador Mihnea Motoc
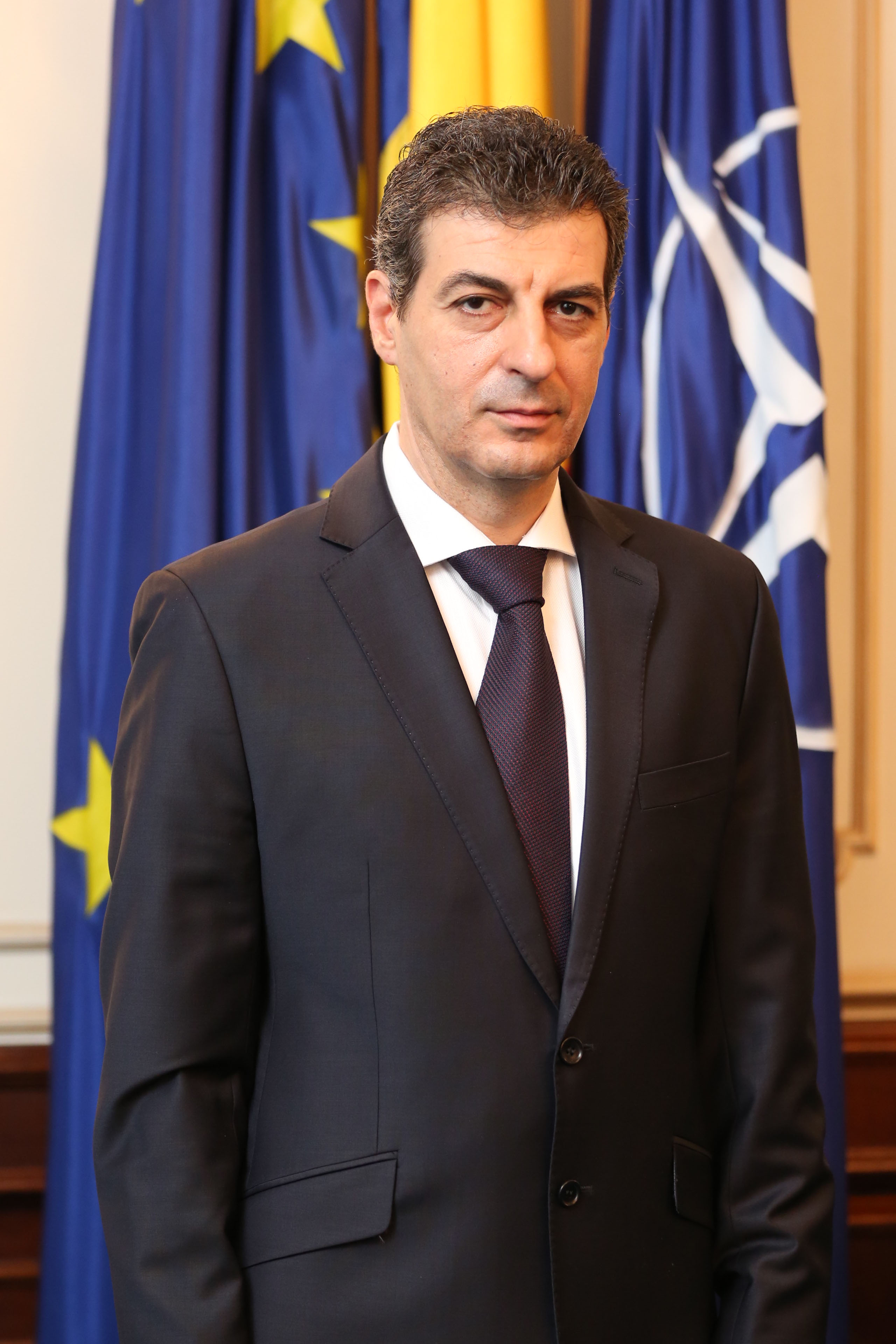
- Mihnea Motoc (March 2011)

Minister of National Defence
- In office 17 November 2015 – 3 January 2017
- President: Klaus Iohannis
- Prime Minister: Dacian Cioloș
- Preceded by: Mircea Dușa
- Succeeded by: Gabriel Leș

Romanian Ambassador to the United Kingdom
- In office 11 September 2015 – 17 November 2015
- President: Klaus Iohannis
- Prime Minister: Victor Ponta
- Preceded by: Ion Jinga
- Succeeded by: Dan Mihalache

Permanent Representative of Romania to the European Union
- In office April 5, 2008 – 2 August 2015
- President: Traian Băsescu
- Prime Minister: Călin Popescu-Tăriceanu; Emil Boc; Mihai Răzvan Ungureanu; Victor Ponta
- Preceded by: Lazar Comanescu
- Succeeded by: Luminita Teodora Odobescu

Permanent Representative of Romania to the United Nations
- In office 2003 – April 1, 2008
- President: Ion Iliescu
- Succeeded by: Simona Miculescu

State Secretary of Integrity
- In office 2001–2003
- President: Ion Iliescu

Ambassador of Romania in the Netherlands
- In office 1999–2001
- President: Ion Iliescu

Personal details
- Born: November 11, 1966 (age 59) Bucharest, Romania
- Spouse: Iulia Motoc
- Children: 1

Mihnea Ioan Motoc (Romanian pronunciation: [ˈmihne̯a iˈo̯an moˈtok]) is a Romanian diplomat who served as Minister of Defence of Romania between November 2015 and January 2017, in the Cioloș Cabinet. Before this appointment, he was the country's ambassador to the European Union between 2008 and 2015, and briefly the country's ambassador to the United Kingdom. He is the Principal Adviser in the European Commission's Inspire, Debate, Engage and Accelerate Action (IDEA) department.

== Career ==
Motoc has been a Romanian diplomat since the early 1990s, when he joined the Ministry of Foreign Affairs of Romania. For most of the 1990s Motoc spent time in various Romanian government posts. He joined the United Nations in 2003, where he spent five years working as the Permanent Representative of Romania. In 2008, he left his post at the UN to become the Permanent Representative of Romania to the European Union. He held this position until becoming Ambassador of Romania to London for a few months in 2015. In November 2015, he was appointed Minister of Defence in the Cioloș Cabinet and held the position until January 2017.

In June 2026, he was again proposed as Minister of Defence in a government to be led by Eugen Tomac.

== Education ==
Motoc studied law at the University of Bucharest from 1984 until 1989. Following this he went on to achieve a Certificate of post-graduate studies in Private International Law from the University of Nice in 1991 and a master's degree in Public International and Comparative Law from George Washington University a year later.

== Honors ==
- Commander, National Order for Merit (Romania)
- President of National Security Authority
- Head of the Romanian Negotiations Team with the NATO
- Conducted negotiations within UN, Council of Europe, OSCE, EU and Neighboring Treaties negotiations
- Member of the Permanent Inter-ministerial Committee for European Integration
- Monitor for” acquis communautaire” on Common Foreign Security Policy
- President of the Inter-Departmental Commission for Romania's accession to NATO
- National Coordinator of the Stability Pact for South Eastern Europe
- Member of the International Humanitarian Fact-Finding Commission
- Vice-chairman for the Executive Council of the Organization for the Prohibition of Chemical Weapons

== Personal life ==
Mihnea Motoc was born on 11 November 1966 in Bucharest. He is fluent in English and French. He is married to Iulia Motoc, Judge at the European Court of Human Rights with whom he has one son, Luca-Mihnea.
