= Simona Miculescu =

Romanian diplomat

Simona-Mirela Miculescu
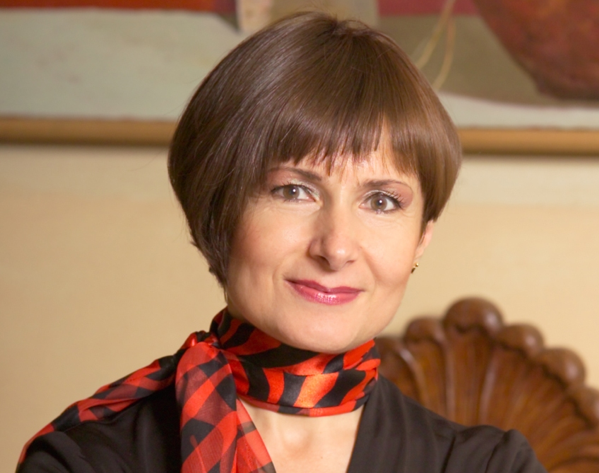
- Miculescu in 2010

Permanent Delegate of Romania to UNESCO
- Incumbent
- Assumed office 19 January 2021
- President: Klaus Iohannis
- Preceded by: Adrian Mihai Cioroianu

Representative of the UN Secretary-General and Head of the UN Office in Belgrade
- In office 20 July 2015 – 30 November 2020

Permanent Representative of Romania to the United Nations
- In office June 5, 2008 – July 19, 2015
- President: Traian Basescu, Klaus Iohannis
- Preceded by: Mihnea Motoc
- Succeeded by: Ion Jinga

Vice-President of the Assembly of States Parties of the International Criminal Court
- In office 2010–2011
- Appointed by: Assembly of States Parties
- Preceded by: Zachary Muburi-Muita
- Succeeded by: Ken Kanda

Senior Foreign Policy Advisor to the President of Romania
- In office 2000–2004
- President: Ion Iliescu
- Preceded by: Zoe Petre
- Succeeded by: Anca Ilinoiu

Personal details
- Born: July 4, 1959 (age 67) Satu Mare, Romanian People's Republic
- Spouse: Ovidiu Miculescu (1986–present)
- Children: 2
- Education: Babeș-Bolyai University
- Awards: Order of the Star of Romania, Knight rank Order of Rio Branco, Commander rank Order of the Star of Italian Solidarity, Grand Official rank

Simona-Mirela Miculescu (born 4 July 1959) is a Romanian diplomat, currently serving as Permanent Delegate of Romania to UNESCO, with the rank of Ambassador Extraordinary and Plenipotentiary, and President of the 42nd session of the General Conference of UNESCO. Prior to this she was Representative of the UN Secretary-General and Head of the UN Office in Belgrade, and before that, the Permanent Representative of Romania to the United Nations in New York. She also served as Foreign Policy Advisor to the President of Romania, and is the first woman in Romania's diplomatic history to be granted the rank of Ambassador.

== Education ==
Born in Satu Mare, Miculescu graduated from Babeș-Bolyai University in Cluj-Napoca with a BA in French and English Literature and Language in 1982. She took a Public Relations Professional Certificate at George Washington University, Washington, D.C. (1997). She has a Ph.D. magna cum laudae in French Literature (Babeș-Bolyai University, 1999). Other professional training includes a Diplomatic Course at the Institute of International Relations at The University of Leeds, UK, and a Senior Executive Seminar at the George C. Marshall Center for European Security Studies in Garmisch-Partenkirchen, Germany (2002).

== Career ==
Previously, Miculescu was the Director of the Department for Communication and Public Diplomacy within the Romanian Ministry of Foreign Affairs. During her diplomatic career, she served twice as Spokesperson for the Romanian Ministry of Foreign Affairs, twice as Senior Media Advisor to the Minister (in 1993 and 1999), Director of the Press Department within the Romanian Ministry of Foreign Affairs (1994), Press Secretary of the Romanian Embassy in Washington, D.C. (1994–1998), and as Senior Public Information Officer at the Mission of the Organization for Security and Cooperation in Europe (OSCE) in Kosovo (1999–2000).

Between 2000 and 2004, she served as Foreign Policy Advisor to the President of Romania (during President Ion Iliescu's second term), becoming the first woman in Romania's diplomatic history to be granted the rank of Ambassador.

Between 2006 and 2007, as part of BearingPoint, she acted as Senior Advisor for Public Outreach to the Government of Iraq in Baghdad.

== Academic background ==
She has been a professor of International Public Relations at two Romanian universities, and has published of several books and tens of articles. In Romania, she is known as an expert in the area of management of International Public Relations and developed the first curriculum on this topic, which is now used in several Romanian universities.

== Affiliations ==
- Founding member (1995–present) and president of the Romanian Public Relations Association (in Romanian) (2003–2005)
- Founding member of the Global Alliance for Public Relations and Communication Management (2000–present)
- Founding member of Casa NATO, Bucharest (2002–present)
- Founding member of UNRocks band (2012-present)
- Member of the "George C. Marshall Association of Romania" (2002–present)
- Honorary member of the English Speaking Union – Romania (2003–present)
- Founding member and board member of the "Friends of the Minovici Museums Association" (2005–present)
- Member of the International Association of Permanent Representatives to the UN (2008–present)
- Member of the Washington Women Diplomat Association, Washington, D.C. (1995–1999)
- Member of the National Press Club, Washington, D.C. (1995–1999)
- Member of the Public Relations Society of America (1996–2008)
- Member of the International Public Relations Association (2004–2008)

== Honors and mentions ==
- The National Order "Diplomatic Merit" in the rank of Knight, granted by the President of Romania, Traian Băsescu, April 2007
- The National Order of the Star of Italian Solidarity in the rank of Grand Official, granted by the President of The Italian Republic, Carlo Azeglio Ciampi, June 2004
- Medal for special merits within the process of the European and Euro-Atlantic Integration of Romania, granted by the George C. Marshall Association of Romania, February 2003
- The Order of Rio Branco in the rank of Commander, granted by the President of the Federative Republic of Brazil, Fernando Cardoso, May 2002
- The National Order of the Star of Romania in the rank of Knight, granted by the President of Romania, Ion Iliescu, December 2002
- Included by Capital Magazine in the "Top 100 Most Successful Women in Romania" – 2005, 2006, 2007, and 2008
- Included by the Capital Magazine in the "Top 50 Most Successful Women in Romania" – 2004
- Awarded by Avantaje Magazine as "Woman of the Year 2008 – for the promotion of the image of Romania" – 2008
