= List of presidents and vice-presidents of the Assembly of States Parties of the International Criminal Court =

The Assembly of States Parties of the International Criminal Court (ICC) provides management oversight regarding the administration of the ICC; considers and decides the budget for the Court; elects judges; considers any question relating to non-cooperation; and adopts the framework of operation of the Court (Rome Statute article 112).

The Assembly is integrated by all States that have ratified or acceded to the Rome Statute. In its deliberations it may invite observers to participate.

The Assembly is assisted in the discharge of its responsibilities by a representative Bureau, appointed to three-year terms, and consisting of a President, two Vice-Presidents and 18 members States Parties. Each Vice-president leads the work of the Bureau in the respective Working Groups, one based in The Hague, seat of the Court (The Hague Working Group), and another at the headquarters of the UN (The New York Working Group). The following table lists the diplomatic or government officials that have served as presidents and vice-presidents of the Assembly of States Parties since the first session of the Assembly which took place in September 2002.

Sessions	Election date	President	Regional Group of President	Gender	Election date	Vice-president in The Hague	Regional Group of VP	Election date	Vice-president in New York	Regional Group of VP
1–3	3 September 2002	1. Zeid bin Ra'ad (Jordan)	Asia-Pacific	M				3 September 2002; 3 September 2002	(Sierra Leone) Allieu Ibrahim Kanu (Uruguay) Felipe Paolillo	Africa / GRULAC
4–6	9 September 2004	2. Bruno Stagno Ugarte (Costa Rica)	Latin America and the Caribbean	M	28 November 2005; 28 November 2005	(Austria) Erwin Kubesch (South Africa) Hlengiwe Mkhize	WEOG / AFRICA			
7–9	13 December 2007	3. Christian Wenaweser(Liechtenstein)	Western and Other Groups	M	14 November 2008	(Mexico) Jorge Lomónaco	GRULAC	14 November 2008; 10 December 2010	(Kenya) Zachary Muburi-Muita (Romania) Simona Miculescu (Note: Zachary Muburi-Muita resigned on 27 August 2010; Simona Miculescu was elected vice-president in his stead and took over as coordinator of the New York Working Group.)	Africa / EEG
10–12	12 December 2011	4. Tiina Intelmann (Estonia)	Eastern Europe	F	12 December 2011	(Switzerland) Markus Börlin	WEOG	12 December 2011	(Ghana) Ken Kanda	Africa
13–16	8 December 2014	5. Sidiki Kaba (Senegal)	Africa	M	8 December 2014; 16 November 2016	(Uruguay) Álvaro Moerzinger (Costa Rica) Sergio Ugalde (Note: Álvaro Moerzinger resigned effective 20 September 2016; Sergio Ugalde took over as coordinator of The Hague Working Group and was later elected vice-president in his stead.)	GRULAC	17 December 2014	(Italy) Sebastiano Cardi	WEOG
17–19	4 December 2017	6. (South Korea) O-Gon Kwon (Republic of Korea)	Asia-Pacific	M	14 December 2017; 5 December 2018	(Senegal) Momar Diop (Denmark) Jens-Otto Horslund (Note: Momar Diop resigned effective 19 March 2018; Jens-Otto Horslund took over as coordinator of The Hague Working Group and was later elected vice-president in his stead.)	AFRICA / WEOG	14 December 2017	(Slovakia) Michal Mlynár	EEG
20–22	18 December 2020	7. Silvia Fernández de Gurmendi (Argentina)	Latin America and the Caribbean	F	12 February 2021	(Czech Republic) Kateřina Sequensová	EEG	12 February 2021	(Canada) Robert Rae	WEOG
23–25	4 December 2023	8. Päivi Kaukoranta (Finland)	Western and Other Groups	F	4 December 2023	(Poland) Margareta Kassangana	EEG	4 December 2023	(Sierra Leone) Michael Kanu	Africa
