= Marlene Moses =

Nauruan diplomat

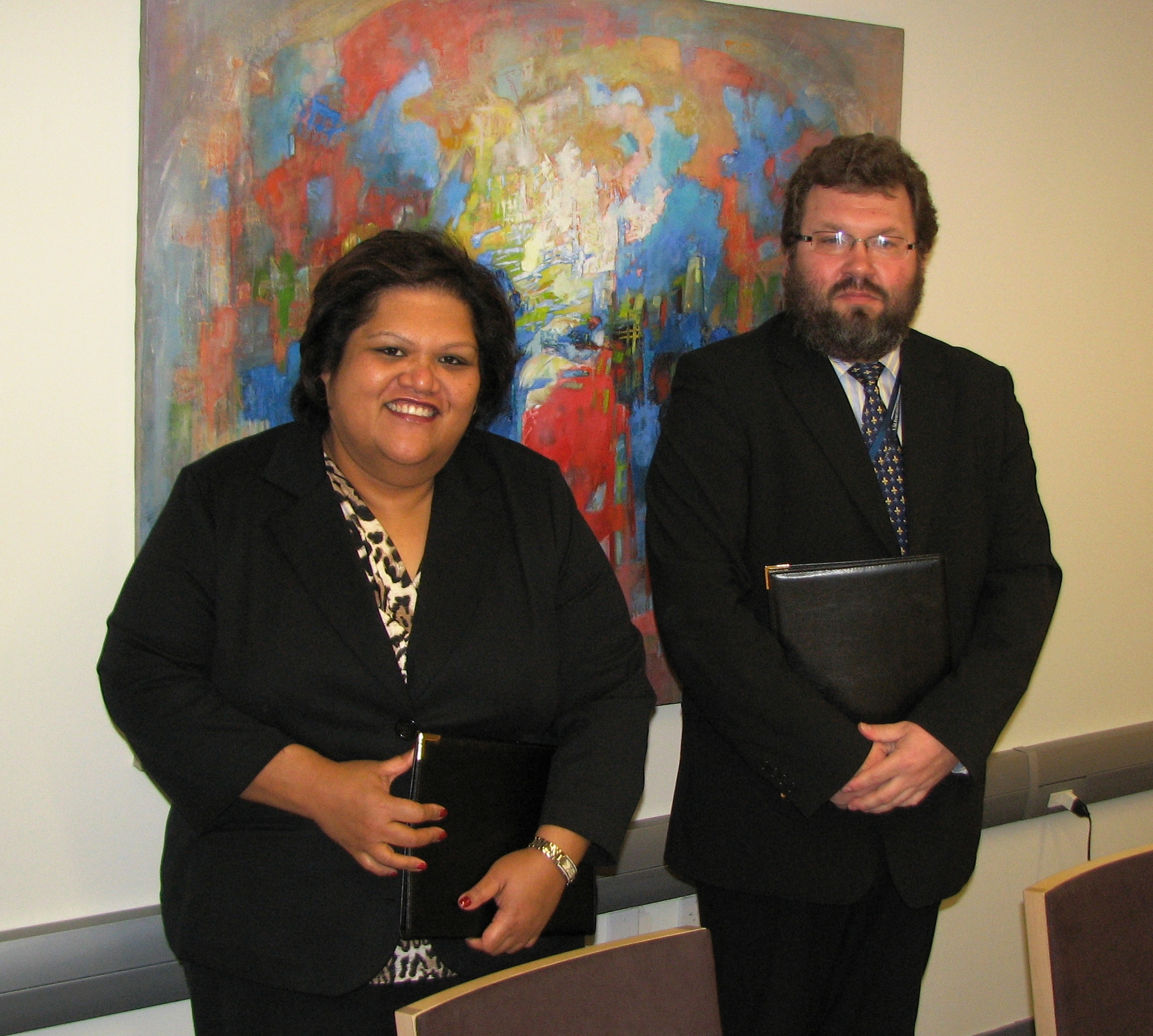
Marlene Moses (left) and Margus Kolga establish diplomatic relations between Nauru and Estonia (2012)

Marlene Inemwin Moses (born 1961 in Aiwo) is a diplomat and a political and administrative figure from Nauru. She has served since 2005 as the Nauruan Permanent Representative to the United Nations, with ambassadorial rank, having previously held consular responsibilities in Japan and New Zealand. She is also an expert in health administration.

== Background and political affiliation ==
Educated at Australian universities, Moses has been associated with the Nauru First Party, along with figures such as Dr. Kieren Keke, who in December 2007 became Foreign Minister in President of Nauru Marcus Stephen's Administration, and David Adeang. However, she was not immediately identified with the internal dissentions which rocked Nauru First in 2007, leading to ministerial crises.

== Professional record ==
Moses is an administrator with many years of public service, and, given that she has emerged from times of prolonged political crisis in Nauru with little controversy to her record, some observers believe she might be able to offer uncompromised leadership. Others have pointed to the fact that she has been relatively isolated from day to day constituency matters, and her strengths are chiefly in diplomacy and administration rather than in parliamentary affairs.

She is also a member of the band UNRocks, together with other diplomats.

== Biographical note ==
The appointment of Moses to the UN, in addition to Millicent Aroi's appointment as High Commissioner at Suva, Fiji, has signified women occupying among the most senior of Nauru's diplomatic posts.

== Diplomatic issues ==
One issue which has exercised the Government of Nauru, and which has involved Moses, is the preservation of tuna fishing stocks in the country's territorial waters. For this reason, Moses, on the Nauru government's behalf, has argued for commercial whaling: this issue is likely to be heightened by the Australian government's recent volte face on the issue, given Nauru's dependence on Australia on many issues.

In January 2008 Moses participated in a Pacific Ambassadors' trip to Israel hosted by the Foreign Ministry of that country, with a view to enhancing the Region's relations with Israel.

== See also ==
- Foreign relations of Nauru
- Politics of Nauru
