= Eduardo Ulibarri =

Costa Rican journalist

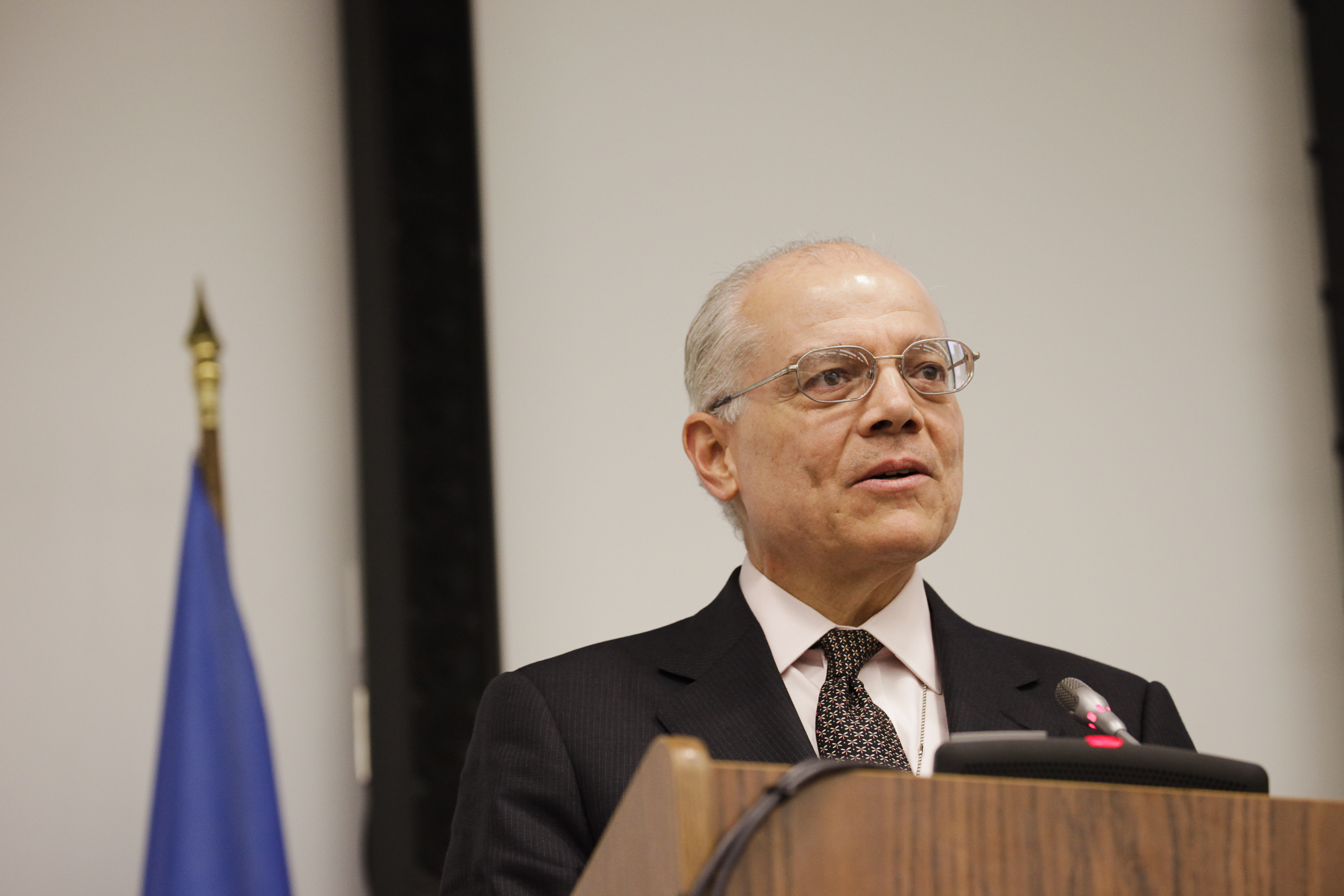
- Born: Eduardo Ulibarri Bilbao; February 3, 1952 (age 74); Remedios, Cuba
- Education: University of Costa Rica; University of Missouri
- Occupations: Journalist, Political commentator, Writer
- Notable credit(s): La Nación director (1982–2003); Inter American Press Association President of Press Freedom Committee (1991-1994)

Eduardo Ulibarri Bilbao (born February 3, 1952) is a Costa Rican journalist.

== Summary of life ==
Eduardo Ulibarri is a journalist, diplomat, academic and consultant specialized in international affairs and communication strategies. He was born in Remedios, Cuba on February 3, 1952. At the age of 14 he emigrated out of Cuba with his parents towards Costa Rica. He is married to María del Rocío Fernández Salazar, a journalist specialized in cultural affairs, and have two sons: Fernando, a jazz musician, and Daniel, an actor and producer.

== Career ==
He graduated from the University of Costa Rica with bachelor and licence degrees in communication, and obtained a master's degree in journalism from the University of Missouri. Between 1987 and 1988 was a Nieman Fellow at Harvard University, with emphasis on the humanities and international affairs.

He was director of La Nación, Costa Rica's leading newspaper, from 1982 until 2003. After leaving the newspaper, he developed a practice in consulting on strategic communications, media organizations, international and socio-political analysis. He also became involved in the boards of some NGOs and corporations.

In June 2010 he was appointed Ambassador and Permanent Representative of Costa Rica to the United Nations. He is the current chairman of its Committee on Information.

Since 1976 he has been a professor of journalism at the University of Costa Rica's School of Collective Communication Sciences.

He was president of the Inter American Press Association's Press Freedom Committee from 1991 to 1994 and was the main drafter of the "Chapultepec Declaration" which deals with freedom of expression. From 1989 to 2002 he served as member of the board of the International Center for Journalists, based in Washington, D.C., and is currently member of its advisory board.

He has authored several books on journalism and current events, has worked as political analyst and is an international advisor in governance, freedom of expression and journalistic integrity, and media subjects to both local and international news organizations. His last book is "La ONU que yo viví" (La UN that I lived), on his experiences as permanent representative of Costa Rica to the UN.

In 2005, together with other journalists and media leaders, he established the Costa Rica Instituto de Prensa y Libertad de Expresión (IPLEX) which is based in San José, Costa Rica, and became its first president until 2010, when he was nominated Permanent Representative to the United Nations.

He contributes frequently, with opinion pieces to the daily newspaper La Nación, Costa Rica.

He is also a member of UNRocks.

== Accolades and awards ==
- Medal for distinguished service in journalism (University of Missouri, 1969)
- Maria Moors Cabot prize (Columbia University, 1996)
- National Prize for Journalism (Costa Rica, 1997)
- ALACOP Prize (Latin American Association of Political Consultants), (Buenos Aires, Argentina, 2002)
