= Tiina Intelmann =

Estonian diplomat (born 1963)

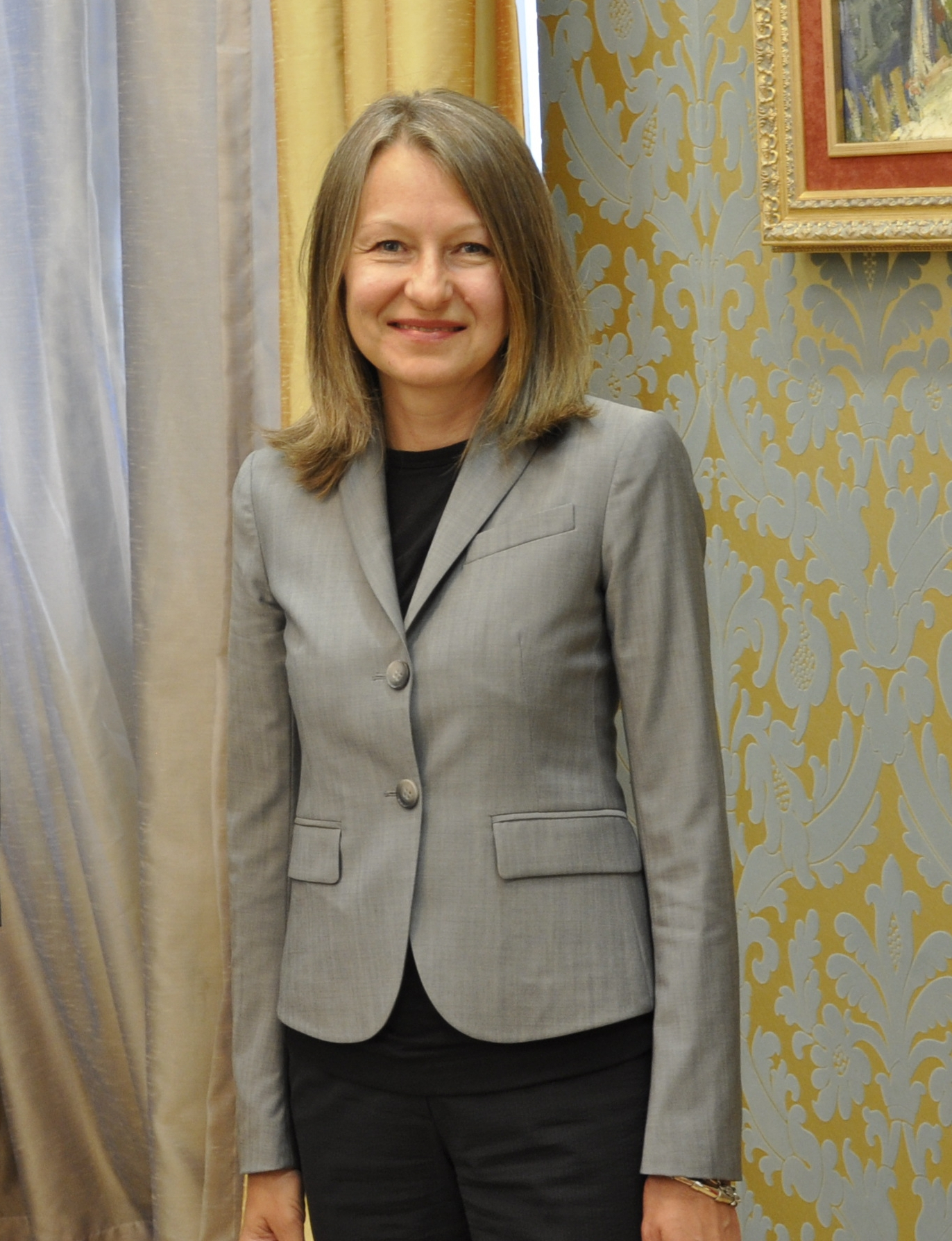
- Intelmann in 2011
- Born: August 25, 1963 (age 63); Tallinn, Estonia
- Occupation: Diplomat
- Office: Ambassador of the European Union to Somalia
- Predecessor: David O'Sullivan

Tiina Intelmann (born 25 August 1963) is an Estonian diplomat; she was the Permanent Representative of Estonia to the United Nations in New York from 2005 to 2011 and was the President of the Assembly of States Parties of the International Criminal Court from December 2011 until December 2014. She then served as the Head of the Delegation of the European Union to Liberia.

== Early life and education ==
Born in Tallinn, Intelmann was graduated from Leningrad State University in 1987 with a Master of Arts degree in Italian language and literature.

== Career ==
In 1991, Intelmann became a diplomat with the Ministry of Foreign Affairs of Estonia. From 1999 to 2002, she was Estonia's Permanent Representative to the Organization for Security and Cooperation in Europe. From 2002 to 2005 Intelmann was the Foreign Ministry's Undersecretary for Political Affairs and Relations with the Press. She became the Permanent Representative to the United Nations on 30 March 2005. In 2011, her term at the UN ended and she became Estonia's ambassador to Israel and Estonia's non-resident ambassador to Montenegro.

On 12 December 2011, Intelmann was elected to succeed Christian Wenaweser as the President of the Assembly of States Parties of the International Criminal Court. She is the first woman to have headed the ICC's Assembly of States Parties. Tiina Intelmann was succeeded as President of the Assembly by Sidiki Kaba, Minister of Justice of Senegal. Intelmann was the Estonian ambassador to the United Kingdom from 2017 to 2021.

On 4 August 2021, the European Union External Action Service announced that Intelmann had been appointed as the Head of Delegation of the European Union to Somalia. Intelmann's duties in this capacity began on 1 September 2021. From August 2026, she started as Estonia's ambassador to Ukraine.

Diplomatic posts
| Preceded by Jaak Jõerüüt | Permanent Representative of Estonia to the United Nations; 2004–2010 | Succeeded by Margus Kolga |
| Preceded by Aino Lepik von Wirén (resided in Tallinn) | Ambassador of Estonia to Israel; 2011 | Succeeded by Malle Talvet-Mustonen |
| Preceded by Christian Wenaweser (Liechtenstein) | President of the Assembly of States Parties to the Rome Statute of the International Criminal Court; 2011-2014 | Succeeded by Sidiki Kaba (Senegal) |
| Preceded by Attilio Pacifici (Italy) | Head of the Delegation of the European Union in Liberia; 2014–present | Incumbent |
| Preceded by Lauri Bambus | Ambassador of Estonia to the United Kingdom; 2017–present | Incumbent |
