= Ion Goriță =

Permanent Representative of Romania to the United Nations
- In office 1994–2000

President of UNICEF
- In office 1996–1996
- Preceded by: Khalil Makkawi
- Succeeded by: Mercedes Pulido

Personal details
- Profession: diplomat

Ion Goriță is a Romanian diplomat and United Nations official. He served as the Permanent Representative of Romania to the United Nations in New York from 1994 to 2000 and as President of the UNICEF Executive Board at the international level in 1996. Before his appointment as Permanent Representative to the U.N., he served as Secretary of State (Deputy Foreign Minister) in the Ministry of Foreign Affairs. He was Chairman of the Joint Inspection Unit from 2004 to 2005.
