= John S. Pobee =

Ghanaian Christian theologian (1937–2020)

John Samuel Pobee (9 July 1937 – 22 January 2020) was a Ghanaian Christian theologian and former Vicar General of the Anglican Diocese of Accra, Ghana.

== Biography ==
Pobee studied at Adisadel College (1950–1956), the University of Ghana (1957–1961), and Selwyn College, Cambridge (1961–1966). He completed his priestly training at Westcott House, Cambridge (1963–1964). He was Emeritus Professor at the University of Ghana, where he previously taught and served as Head of Department for the Study of Religions and Dean of the Faculty of Arts.

Pobee was known for his work in the New Testament, African Christian theology, and missiology. He wrote his memoirs, Sense of Grace and Mission, and a festschrift was prepared in his honor, entitled Trajectories of Religion in Africa.

On 26 July 1994, Pobee married Martha Ama Akyaa Nkrumah, a career diplomat of the Ghana Foreign Service.

Pobee died in Ghana in January 2020 at the age of 82.

== Works ==
- Pobee, John S. (1979). Toward an African theology. Nashville, TN: Abingdon. ISBN 9780687424207.
- Pobee, John S. (1985). Persecution and Martyrdom in the Theology of Paul. New York: Bloomsbury. ISBN 9780905774534.
- Pobee, John S. (2009). The Anglican Story in Ghana: From Mission Beginnings to Province of Ghana. Kaneshie-Accra, Ghana: African Books Collective. ISBN 9789988037802.
- Pobee, John S. (2012). Sense of Grace and Mission. Kaneshie-Accra, Ghana: African Books Collective. ISBN 9789988152284.
