= Sidiki Kaba =

Senegalese politician

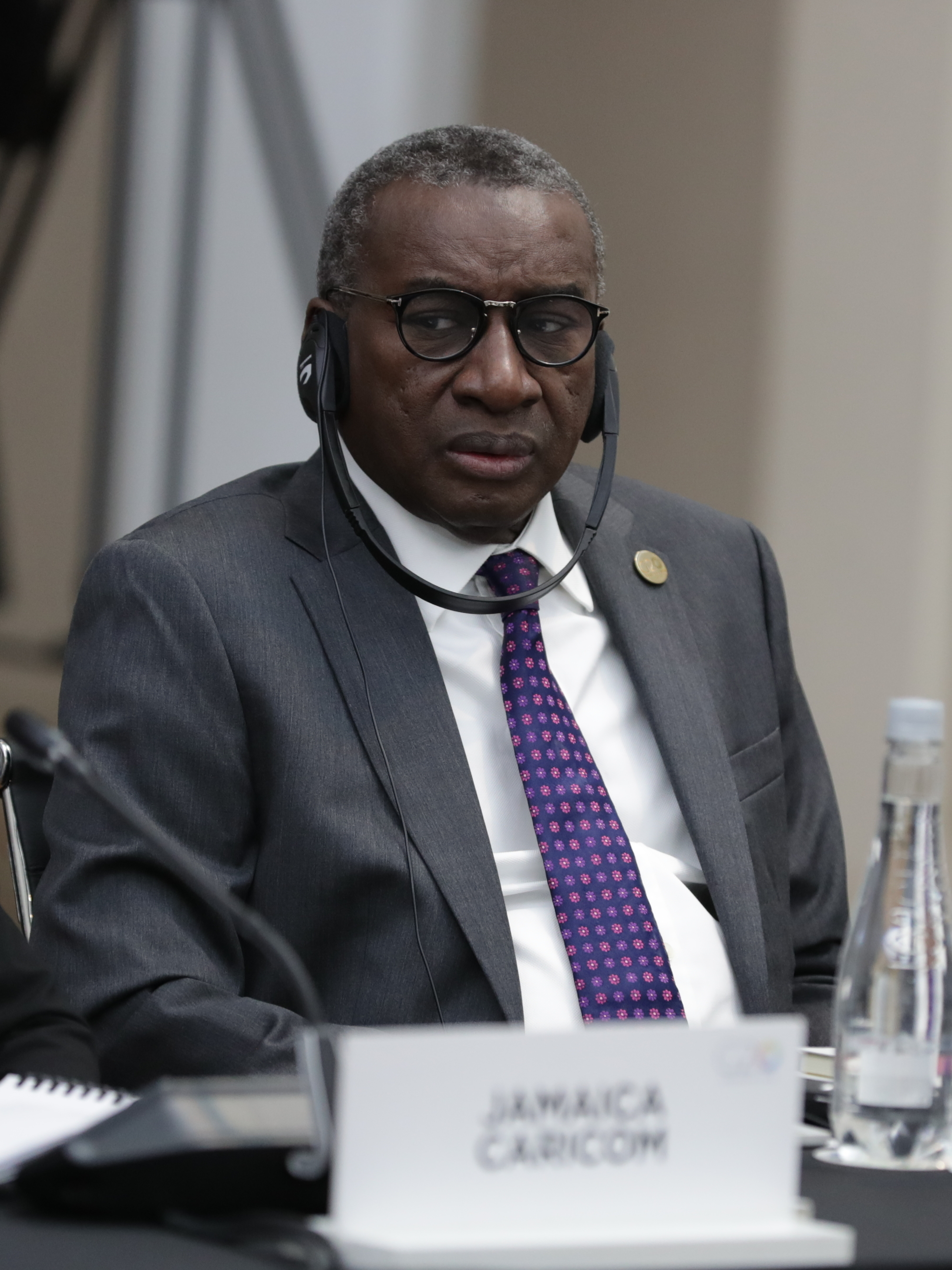
- Kaba in 2018

15th Prime Minister of Senegal
- In office 6 March 2024 – 3 April 2024
- President: Macky Sall; Bassirou Diomaye Faye
- Preceded by: Amadou Ba
- Succeeded by: Ousmane Sonko

Interior Minister of Senegal
- In office 11 October 2023 – 6 March 2024
- President: Macky Sall
- Prime Minister: Amadou Ba

President of the Assembly of States Parties of the International Criminal Court
- In office 2014–2017
- Appointed by: Assembly of States Parties
- Preceded by: Tiina Intelmann
- Succeeded by: O-Gon Kwon

Personal details
- Born: 21 August 1950 (age 75) Tambacounda, Senegal
- Party: Alliance for the Republic

Sidiki Kaba (born 21 August 1950) is a Senegalese politician who served as the 15th Prime Minister of Senegal from 6 March 2024 to 3 April 2024.

He is the keeper of the seals and the Minister of Justice of Senegal since 2013. On 8 December 2014, he was elected President of the Assembly of States Parties to the Rome Statute of the International Criminal Court as consensus candidate from the African States Parties and endorsed by the Bureau of the Assembly. He served as President of the Assembly, which operates from New York and The Hague, while also continuing his functions as Minister of Justice from Dakar.

Sidiki Kaba studied law. He has dedicated his professional career to the promotion and protection of human rights, particularly on issues related to freedom of press, women's and political rights. He participated in the 1998 negotiations of the Rome Statute and thereafter he implemented numerous campaigns to promote the ratification of the Statute by Senegal and many other African countries. In 2001, he became the first African to be elected President of the International Federation of Human Rights, organization that he had previously represented to the African Commission on Human and People's Rights. He is founder of numerous legal and advocacy organizations.

== Early life ==
Sidiki Kaba attended the regional elementary school of Tambacounda, Senegal, and the Lycée Van Volhonoven (currently Lycée Lamine Gueye) in Dakar, graduating in 1972. He obtained three bachelor's degrees at the University of Abidjan, Côte d'Ivoire: in law, in philosophy and in modern literature. He also obtained a master in business law at the University of Dakar in Senegal, and was admitted to the Bar of Senegal in 1980.

== Human rights activist ==
Sidiki Kaba has worked extensively establishing organizations of human rights in Africa.

In 1979 he joined the Senegalese section of Amnesty International. In 1982 he co-founded the Inter-African Union of Lawyers (Union interafricaine des avocats).

From 1990 to 1997 he was the representative of the International Federation of Human Rights FIDH to the African Commission on Human and Peoples' Rights. In this capacity he presented numerous communications, investigations and advocated before the thematic and specialized mandates of the commission.

From 1985 to 2000 he was member of the Board of the Bar of Senegal. From 1995 to 1997 he served as expert member of the Senegalese Committee of Human Rights. From 1987 to 1995 he was the vice-president of the National Organization of Defense of Human Rights (l'Organisation nationale de défense des droits de l'Homme), the first defense organization in Senegal. He presided the ONDH from 1995 until 2001. In 1992 he founded and joined the board of the Inter-African Union of Human Rights (l'Union interafricaine des droits de l'Homme) (UIDH), regional organization based in Ouagadougou (Burkina-Faso).

In 1995 he founded and presided the African Center for the Prevention of Conflicts − (Centre africain pour la prévention des conflits) (CAPREC), and the African Center for the study of human rights and democracy in Banjul (Centre africain pour les études des droits de l'Homme et de la démocratie) (ACDHRS).

From 1998 until 2001 he served as vice-president of the International Federation of Human Rights Fédération internationale des ligues des droits de l'homme (FIDH), and as its president from 2001 until 2007. He is since 2007, honorary president of the FIDH. During his term as president, he represented the FIDH globally and among numerous regional organizations, including the United Nations, African Union, European Union, League of Arab States, Organization of American States, the International Criminal Court, and the International Criminal Tribunal for Rwanda. He was also the legal representative in communications concerning the case of Ely Ould Dah v Mauritania.

As President of the FIDH he led inquiry and high-level missions to Colombia, the Russian Federation, the United States, Guatemala, Egypt, Israel, Chad, Democratic Republic of the Congo, Tunisia, Algeria, Ecuador, and Libya. He has contributed to the training of human rights activists from Colombia, Nicaragua, United States, the Russian Federation, Turkey, Israel, Morocco, Zimbabwe and Chad.

He has served as consultant for the UNDP, UNICEF, the NGO Tostan and the Bar of Lome, Togo. He served as observer for the International Commission of Jurists for the electoral processes in Madagascar, Guinea, Gabon, Guinea Bissau, Côte d'Ivoire, Togo, Mali, Niger, Benin and Senegal. He was mediator in the conflict of Casamance.

As a lawyer in Dakar he has worked to bring numerous cases to Senegal and African tribunals to defend political activists and opposition leaders such as:

- Defense lawyer before domestic tribunals of Laurent Gbagbo, Simone Gbagbo and more than 120 members of the Popular Front Ivoirien (FPI)
- Defense lawyer of Alassane Ouattara in Côte d'Ivoire
- Defense lawyer of Idrissa Seck, former prime minister of Senegal
- Defense lawyer of Alpha Condé, opposition leader in Guinea
- Defense lawyer of Abdoulaye Wade and 200 militants of the Democratic Party of Senegal

He has also defended human rights activities:

- Defense lawyer of human rights activists and political opponents, including Halidou Ouedraogo, President of the Burkinabe Movement of Human Rights in the case Norbert Zongo (Burkina-Faso)
- Defense lawyer of journalists Abdoulaye Bamba Diallo and Papa Samba Khane, as well as other journalists
- Defense lawyer of René Denis Segui, former president of the Ivoirian Ligue of Human Rights, and former Rapporteur of the United Nations on Extra-judicial executions
- Defense lawyer of Fatimata Mbaye and Cheikh Saad Bouh Kamara from Mauritania

He has also served as defense lawyer of victims:

- Chadian victims in the case of Hissène Habré, in Senegal and Belgium
- Jacqueline Moudeina (Chad), before the UN Committee against Torture in 2001

== Minister of Justice ==
Sidiki Kaba was appointed Minister of Justice of Senegal in 2013 by then Prime Minister Aminata Toure.

As Minister of Justice he is in charge of preserving the judicial independence, prepares the justice policy of the State, and is charge of organizing the public service and justice education. He has authority over penitentiary administration and functions as vice-president of the Superior Council of the Magistrature. Along with the Ministers of Economy, Finance and Planning he represents Senegal at the Organizations for the Harmonization of Business Law in Africa (OHADA).

He is also in charge with the establishment of the specialized Chambers and of overseeing the trial against Hissène Habré, the former dictator from Chad, and of the trial of the son of former president Abdoulaye Wade, Karim Wade on embezzlement charges.

== President of the Assembly of States Parties ==
Sidiki Kaba was elected President of the Assembly of States Parties to the Rome Statute of the International Criminal Court on 8 December 2014. His mandate ran from the thirteenth to the sixteenth session of the Assembly, from 2014 until December 2017. He succeeded Tiina Intelmann, who held this position since December 2011, and was succeeded by O-Gon Kwon.

== Honors ==
Sidiki Kaba was granted the titles of Chevalier of the National Order of the Lion of Senegal (2001), Officer of the Legion of Honor of France (2002), and Chevalier of the National Order of Mali (2011). He is Laureate of the Prize for the Promotion of the Culture of Democracy in Africa (awarded by the Pan African Observatory of Democracy in Togo, in 2003), and is an Honorary Citizen of Quito, Ecuador (2004),

== Academic activities and publications ==
Sidiki Kaba has lectured at the Ake Loba College of Abidjan, Côte d'Ivoire, the Human Rights and Peace Institute of the University of Dakar, Senegal and at Evry Val d’Esson University, France.

He has published several books, including on international criminal justice and human rights in Senegal and Africa.

His publications include:

- "L'avenir des droits de l'Homme en Afrique à l'aube du XXIème siècle" (1996) collection XAAM SAA YOON, Dakar, Sénégal
- "Les droits de l'Homme au Sénégal" (1997) collection XAAM SAA YOON, Dakar, Sénégal
- "Défendre la déclaration universelle des droits de l'Homme" (1998)
- " La justice universelle en question, Justice de blancs contre les autres?" (2010), L'Harmattan

== Prime minister ==
On March 6, 2024, Sidiki Kaba was appointed Prime Minister of Senegal.

Political offices
Preceded by Patrick Badouin (France)	President of the FIDH; 2001–2007	Succeeded by Souhayr Belhassen (Tunisia)
Preceded by Aminata Touré	Minister of Justice of Senegal; 2013–2017	Succeeded by Aminata Touré
Preceded by Tiina Intelmann (Estonia)	President of the Assembly of States Parties to the Rome Statute of the International Criminal Court; 2014–2017	Succeeded by O-Gon Kwon (South Korea)
Preceded by Amadou Ba	Prime Minister of Senegal; 2024–2024	Succeeded by Ousmane Sonko
