= Aurel Dragoș Munteanu =

Ambassador of Romania

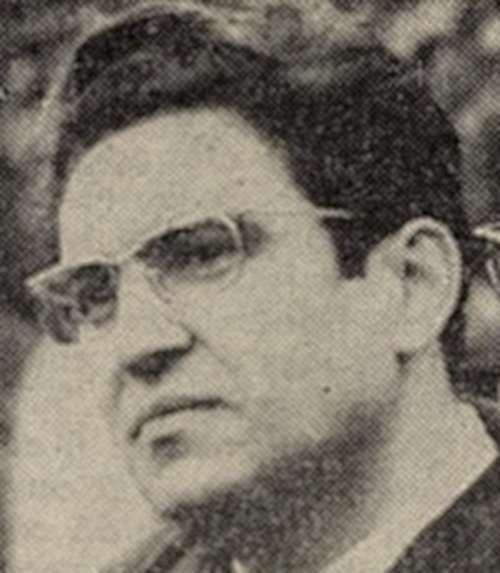
- Munteanu in 1977
- Born: 16 January 1942; Lăpușna, Kingdom of Romania
- Died: 30 May 2005 (aged 63); Washington, D.C., United States
- Resting place: Washington, D.C.
- Education: Babeș-Bolyai University
- Occupations: Writer, diplomat
- Known for: Head of broadcasting during the Romanian Revolution

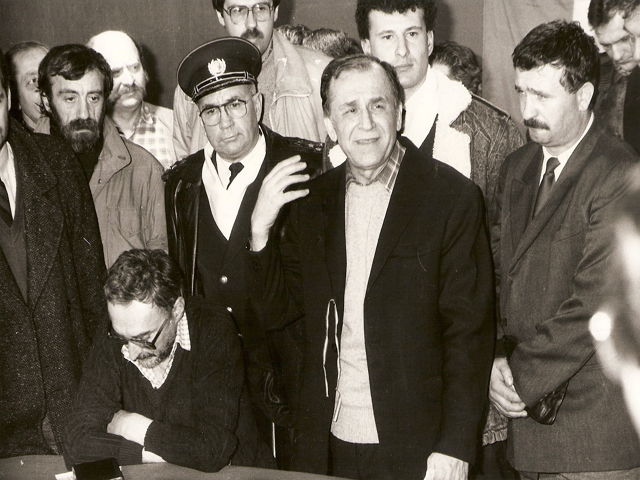
Ion Iliescu at the Romanian Television in a broadcast televised by Munteanu during the Romanian Revolution of 1989.

Aurel Dragoș Munteanu (16 January 1942 – 30 May 2005) was a Romanian author and the director of TVR following the Romanian Revolution of 1989, making him a key part of the National Salvation Front's ability to gain support.

He was born in Lăpușna, at the time in Lăpușna County, Kingdom of Romania, now in Hîncești District, Moldova. A few years later, he took refuge with his family in Transylvania, where he attended high school in Turda, and then the Faculty of Philology of the University of Cluj. Upon graduation, he became an assistant at the Pedagogical Institute in Oradea. He debuted with a volume of short stories, then moved to Bucharest, where he published the novels Singuri (1968), Scarabeul Sacru (1970), Marile Iubiri (1978), and a book of essays.

In October 1988, he wrote a letter to Dumitru Radu Popescu, president of the Writers' Union of Romania, with the request to protect the poets Mircea Dinescu, Dan Deșliu, Ana Blandiana, and other persecuted writers. The letter was made public on Radio Free Europe, after which Munteanu found himself under investigation by the Securitate.

Munteanu held various positions as the Romanian Ambassador to the United States, Ambassador to the United Nations, and president of United Nations Security Council. On 9 February 1990, Munteanu was released from the office of President of the Romanian Radio Channel and on 23 February 1990, he was appointed ambassador and Permanent Representative of Romania to the United Nations.

He died of cancer at age 63, in Washington, D.C., and was buried in the city.
