= Vasile Gliga =

Romanian entrepreneur (born 1959)

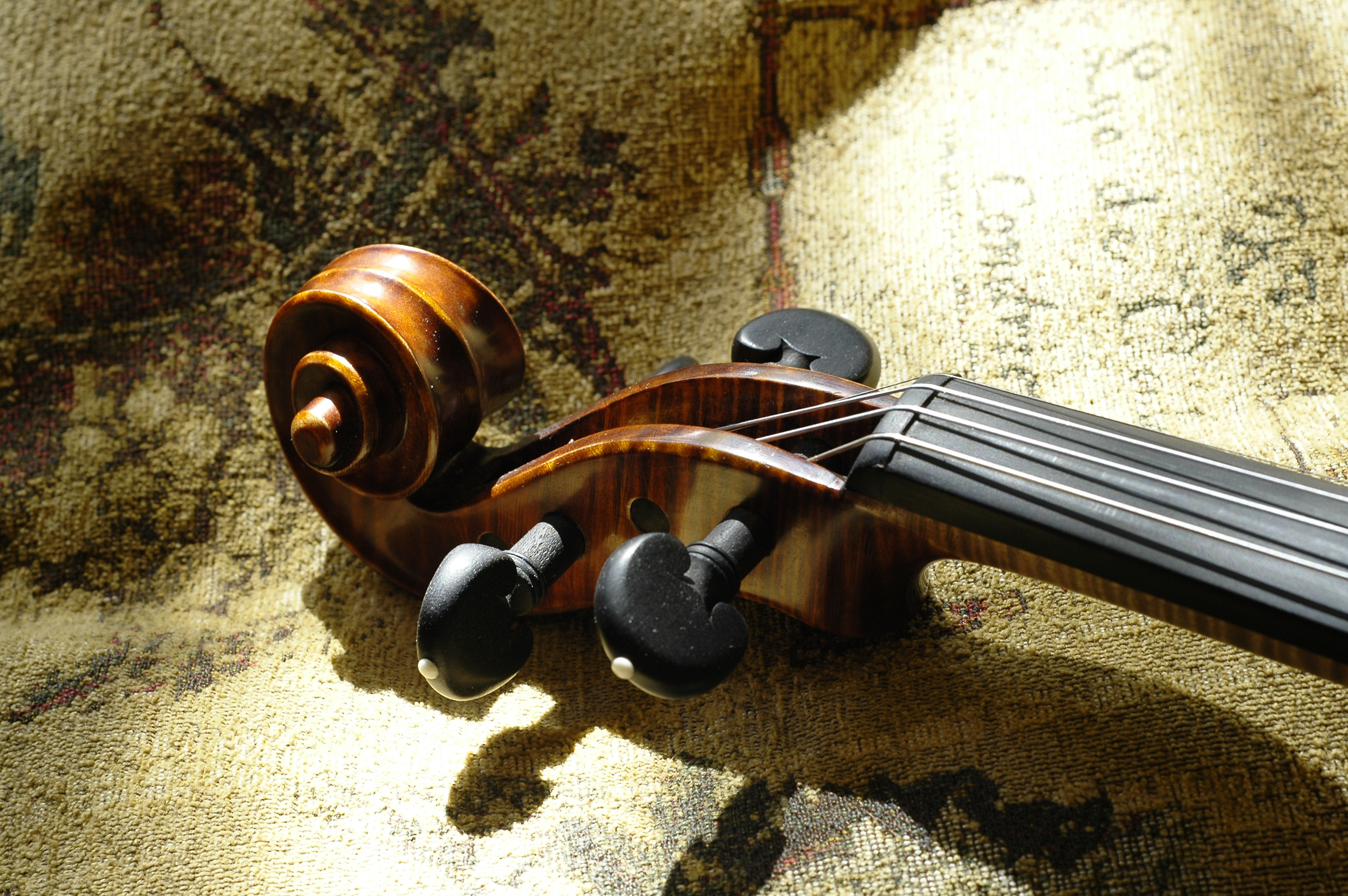
Detail of scroll of 2002 Gliga Maestro Special violin

Vasile Gliga (born April 3, 1959) is a Romanian entrepreneur and the owner and founder of the Gliga Group, a company manufacturing string instruments. He was elected to the Parliament of Romania in 2008.

== Company Information ==
Born in Ibănești, Mureș County, Gliga is the owner of a Romanian enterprise manufacturing violins, violas and cellos in Reghin, Romania called the Gliga Group that has been operating since the 1990s. His son, Cristian, opened a US branch of the company in Pasadena, CA around 2001. The Gliga Group makes an estimated $5,000,000+ a year.

Gliga also serves as the member of presidium of the World Dancesport Federation and its vice-president for marketing.
