= Christian Wenaweser =

Liechtenstein diplomat

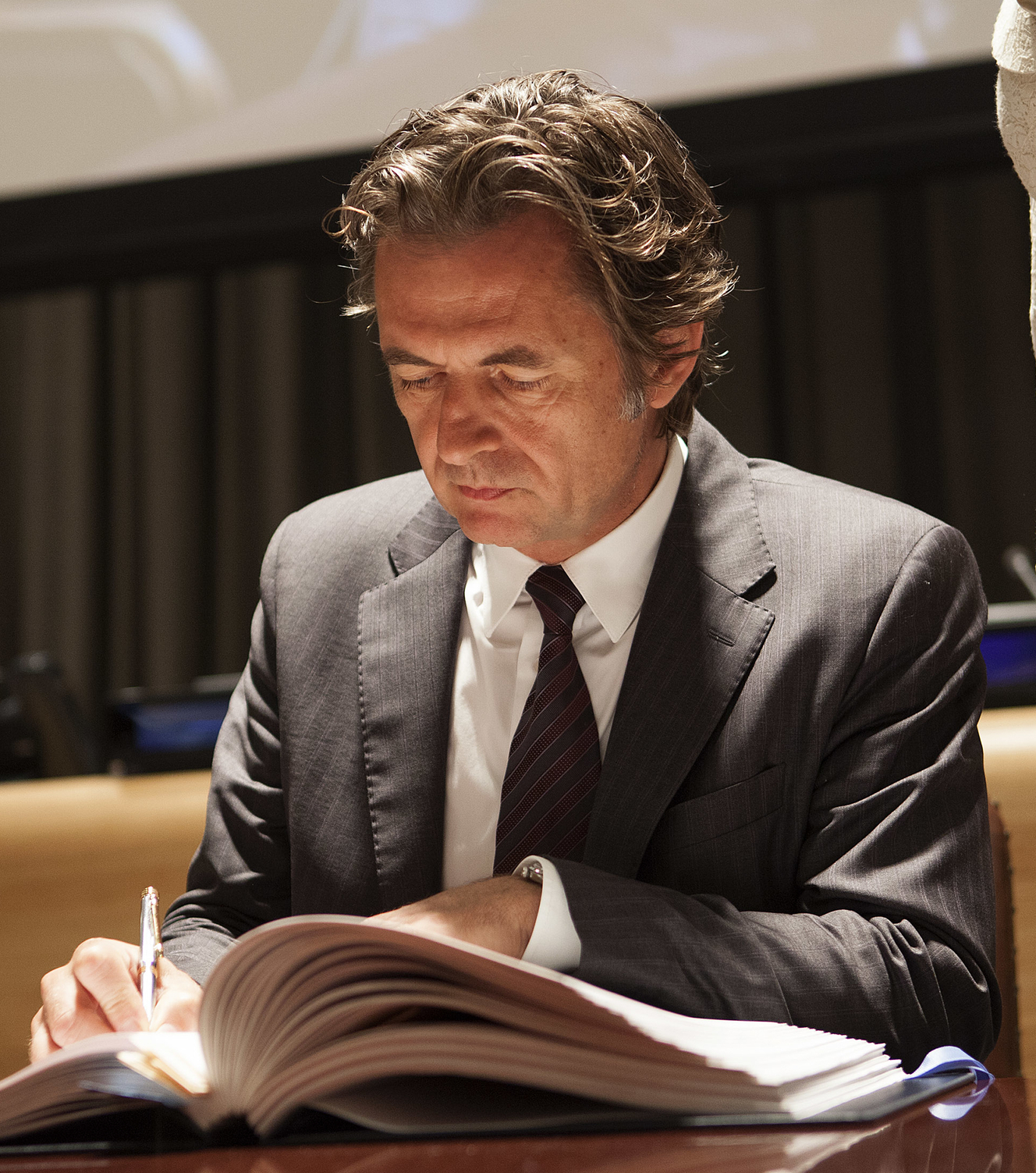
- Wenaweser in 2013

Permanent Representative of Liechtenstein to the United Nations
- Incumbent
- Assumed office 2002

President of the Assembly of States Parties of the International Criminal Court
- In office 2007–2011
- Appointed by: Assembly of States Parties
- Preceded by: Bruno Stagno Ugarte
- Succeeded by: Tiina Intelmann

Chair of the Special Working Group on the Crime of Aggression
- In office 2003–2009

Personal details
- Born: 16 November 1963 (age 61)

Christian Wenaweser (born 16 November 1963) is a Liechtenstein diplomat. He is currently serving as the Permanent Representative of Liechtenstein to the United Nations.

== Education ==
Wenaweser was educated at the University of Zurich, the Graduate Institute of International Studies in Geneva, and the Bavarian Academy of Sciences and Humanities in Munich, Germany.

== Career ==
Since 2002, Wenaweser has been the Permanent Representative of Liechtenstein to the United Nations. In this capacity, he has been particularly active in developing the International Criminal Court (ICC) further.

Within the Assembly of States Parties of the ICC, Wenaweser chaired the Special Working Group on the Crime of Aggression from 2003 and 2009. In 2007, he was elected to a three-year term as the president of the Assembly of States Parties. In this position, he succeeded Bruno Stagno Ugarte of Costa Rica. In December 2011, he was succeeded as the President of the Assembly by Tiina Intelmann.

Between 2003 and 2005 Wenaweser also served as chairman of the ad hoc Committee on the Scope of Legal Protection under the Convention on the Safety of United Nations and Associated Personnel From 2004 until 2005, he was vice-chair of the Open-Ended Working Group on Security Council Reform.

== Other activities ==
- All Survivors Project, Member of the Board of Advisors
- Dag Hammarskjöld Fund for Journalists, Member of the Honorary Advisory Council
- International Center for Transitional Justice (ICTJ), Member of the Advisory Board
- International Gender Champions (IGC), Member
- International Peace Institute (IPI), Member of the International Advisory Council
