= Antonio Pedro Monteiro Lima =

Cape Verdean diplomat

H.E. Antonio Pedro Monteiro Lima

Permanent Representative to the United Nations for Cape Verde
- In office August 2007 – February 2014
- Succeeded by: Fernando Jorge Wahnon Ferreira

Personal details
- Born: 5 January 1948 (age 78) Dakar, Senegal

Antonio Pedro Monteiro Lima (born 5 January 1948) is a Cape Verdean diplomat who was the Permanent Representative to the United Nations for Cape Verde from August 2007 to February 2014. Before working for the UN, Monero Lima held multiple positions in External Affairs from 1975 to 1991. He also was an ambassador for Guinea-Bissau and Algeria between 1982 and 1990.

== Early life and education ==
On 5 January 1948, Monteiro Lima was born in Dakar, Senegal. For his education, he went to France to attend the University of Paris VIII and the Université de Tours.

== Career ==
=== External Affairs ===
During his career, Monterio Lima worked in multiple positions for External Affairs. From 1975 to 1981, Monteiro-Lima worked in the External Affairs Ministry as head of the Department of Africa, Asia, and Oceania. Later, he was Director-General for the Ministry of External Affairs from 1988 to 1990 and moved on to become External Affairs and Emigration's Secretary of State from 1990 to 1991.

=== International Relations ===
Monteiro Lima was an ambassador to Guinea-Bissau from 1983 to 1990 and Algeria's ambassador from 1982 to 1990. On October 23, 2007, he became the Permanent Representative to the United Nations for Cape Verde. In October 2013, Monteiro-Lima signed a letter addressed to Ki-moon that said Cape Verde's government had decided to change the official name of their country to Cabo Verde. In February 2014, Monteiro Lima ended his United Nations position after being replaced by Fernando Jorge Wahnon Ferreira. On the other hand, Monteiro-Lima held multiple positions in diplomacy. His first diplomatic role was as Diplomatic Advisor from 1985 to 1987. Before being appointed as the U.N. ambassador for Cape Verde in 2007, he was a Political Advisor from August 2001 to August 2007.

=== Music ===
Monteiro Lima is a member of the musical group Ambassadors Sing for Peace, which released their self-titled album in September 2013.
