= Ion Jinga =

Romanian diplomat (born 1961)

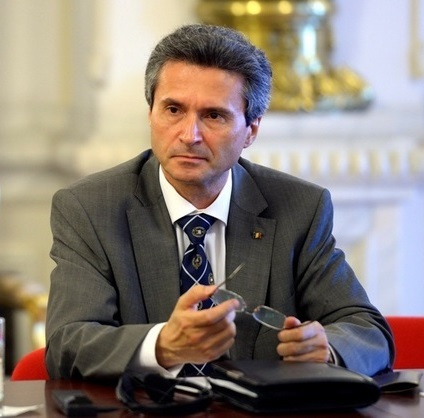
- Ion Jinga in 2013

Permanent Representative of Romania to the Council of Europe
- Incumbent
- Assumed office 2 July 2022

Permanent Representative of Romania to the United Nations in New York
- In office 4 August 2015 – 1 July 2022
- Preceded by: Simona Miculescu
- Succeeded by: Cornel Feruță

Ambassador of Romania to the United Kingdom of Great Britain and Northern Ireland
- In office 7 March 2008 – 4 August 2015
- Preceded by: Dan Ghibernea
- Succeeded by: Mihnea Motoc

Ambassador of Romania to the Kingdom of Belgium
- In office 9 April 2003 – 7 March 2008

Personal details
- Born: 1 September 1961 (age 65) Câmpulung, Romanian People's Republic
- Spouse: Daniela Jinga
- Children: 1
- Education: University of Bucharest; National University of Political Studies and Public Administration; College of Europe
- Occupation: Diplomat
- Awards: National Order of Merit (Romania), Officer rank Ordre national du Mérite, Officer rank Order of the Crown (Belgium), Grand Cross rank

Ion Jinga (born 1 September 1961) is a Romanian diplomat working in the Romanian Ministry of Foreign Affairs since 1992. Between 9 April 2003 and 7 March 2008 he was the Ambassador to Belgium and between 7 March 2008 and 4 August 2015 he was Ambassador to the United Kingdom. Between 4 August 2015 and 1 July 2022 he was Ambassador extraordinary and plenipotentiary, Permanent Representative of Romania to the United Nations in New York. On 2 July 2022 he started his term as Ambassador extraordinary and plenipotentiary, Permanent Representative of Romania to the Council of Europe in Strasbourg.

== Studies ==
Born in Câmpulung, Jinga attended from 1976 the city's Dinicu Golescu High School, graduating in 1980 as a valedictorian. He subsequently enrolled in the Faculty of Physics at the University of Bucharest, which he graduated from in 1986. During his final two university years he taught as a physics teacher and after graduation he worked as a physicist engineer at the Institute of Nuclear Power Reactors in Pitești. Between 1991 and 1992 he worked for the Argeș County Prefecture, and on 1 November 1992 he became a diplomat within the Romanian Ministry of Foreign Affairs.

Jinga graduated from the Faculty of Law at the University of Bucharest (1987–1992) and from the National University of Political Studies and Public Administration (1990–1992). In parallel, between 1991 and 1992, he attended a Master's course at the College of Europe in Bruges, Belgium, which resulted in an MA in European Administration. Next he completed an International Relations course at University of Leeds, United Kingdom, under a "Know How Fund" scholarship offered by the Foreign and Commonwealth Office. Between 1997 and 1999 he conducted a NATO-funded research project entitled "Joining NATO, the EU, and the WEU: differences, similarities, synergies. Romania's case". In 1999 he received a Doctorate in Law for his thesis entitled "Institutional Reform of the European Union in the Context of the Intergovernmental Conference to Review the Maastricht Treaty". His thesis was published as a book entitled "The European Union: Realities and Perspectives" (Ed. Lumina Lex, 1999).

== Diplomatic activity ==
Starting 1 November 1992, Ion Jinga was employed within the Romanian Ministry of Foreign Affairs, first occupying the position of Third Secretary within the European Union Directorate, then that of Second Secretary within the Minister's Office and subsequently that of First Secretary, Counsellor, Deputy Ambassador and Chargé d'affaires a.i. at the Mission of Romania to the European Union in Brussels. Between 2002 and 2003 he was Director General for the European Union within the Ministry of Foreign Affairs and one of the six members of the Romanian Delegation to the Convention on the Future of Europe (which prepared the Constitutional Treaty of the European Union, later transformed into the Treaty of Lisbon). On 9 April 2003 he was appointed Ambassador extraordinary and plenipotentiary of Romania to the Kingdom of Belgium and on 7 March 2008 he was appointed Ambassador extraordinary and plenipotentiary of Romania to the United Kingdom of Great Britain and Northern Ireland. Between 4 August 2015 and 1 July 2022, he was Ambassador extraordinary and plenipotentiary, Permanent Representative of Romania to the United Nations in New York. On 2 July 2022 he started his term as Ambassador extraordinary and plenipotentiary, Permanent Representative of Romania to the Council of Europe in Strasbourg, France. In August 2017, by Presidential Decree, Ion Jinga received the diplomatic rank of Ambassador. Jinga speaks English and French, in addition to his Romanian native language.

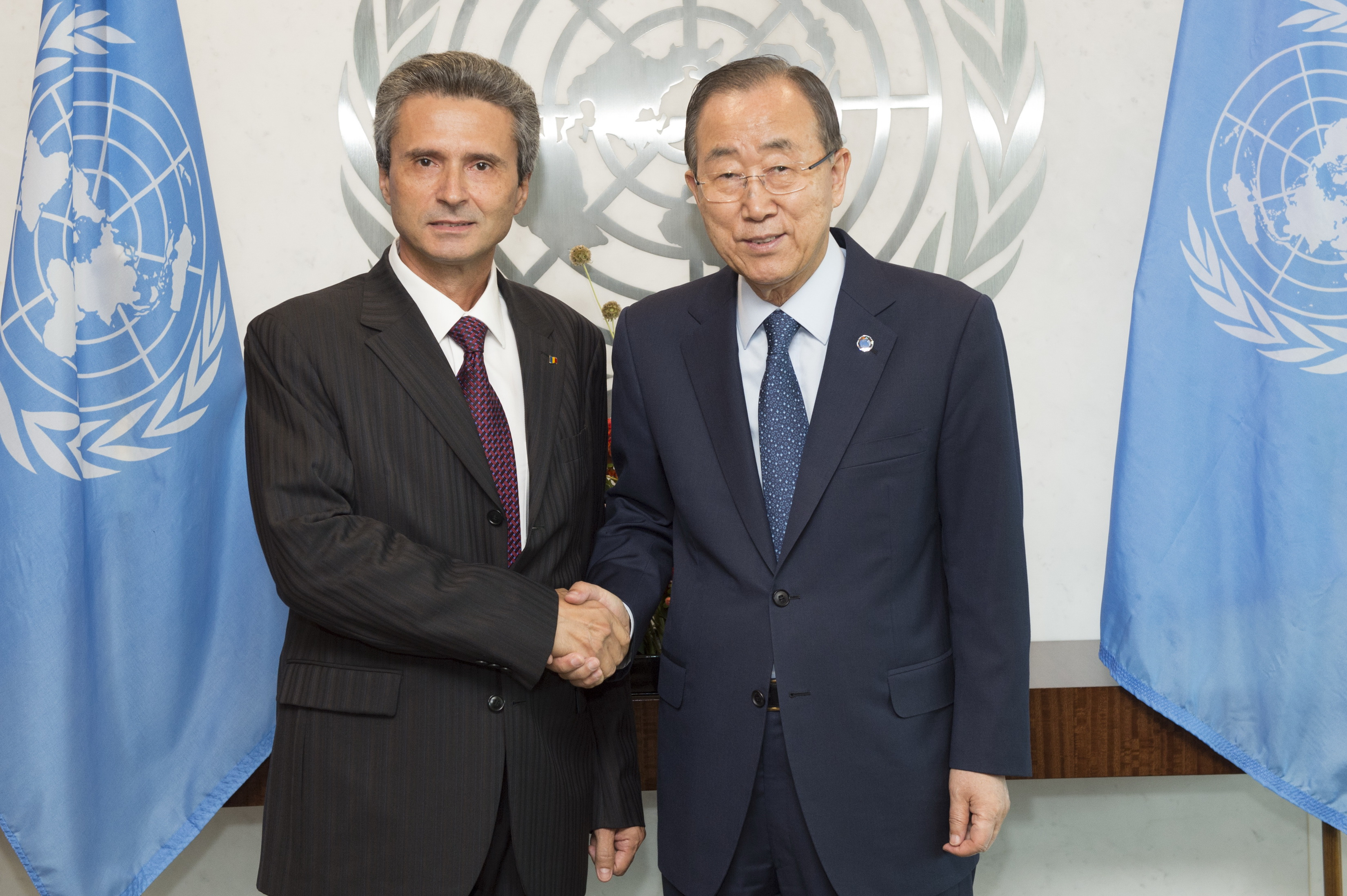
Ion Jinga and Ban Ki-moon, presentation of letters of UN accreditation, August 2015

During his mandate in the United Kingdom, Ambassador Jinga has proven to be an active presence in the British media, emphasizing positive accounts about his country and reacting in moments where Romania was blamed. Within the context of the announcement of the lifting of work restrictions for Romanian nationals in the UK from 1 January 2014, starting with January 2013 a part of the British media launched a series of negative articles concerning Romanians. Ambassador Jinga responded to these allegations through a series of interviews and articles in British newspapers, radio and television, presenting his views on the professional value of Romanians and their significant contribution to the UK economy. When Romania was accused that it was exporting horse meat labelled as beef, Ion Jinga replied in two interviews with the Huffington Post newspaper and Sky News.

In February 2013, Jinga's English-speaking ability was questioned by Romanian media. During that month's meat adulteration scandal, he made a live appearance on CNN. He appeared to be reading off a text rather than providing an impromptu reply, and his English was described as "approximate", "embarrassing", "halting", and "open to interpretation". Subsequently, the Romanian Ministry of Foreign Affairs released a statement ascribing Jinga's "long pauses and clipped words" to technical difficulties caused by the interviewer's presence in Hong Kong, which led to a delay of several seconds (thus making impossible to say the next phrase prior to hearing the end of the previous one), overlapping voices from a different newsroom and an echo. and made references to the Ambassador's significant number of previous interviews. CNN addressed apologies to the Ambassador and in writing to the Romanian Embassy. Ion Jinga explained the situation in detail within a Romanian TV show which also presented CNN's letter of apologies. However, a part of the Romanian media was extremely vocal against the Ambassador. In his defense came the President of Romania, the Prime Minister and the Minister of Foreign Affairs, Romanian intellectual personalities, Romanian and British journalists, and student organizations in the United Kingdom. Jinga continued to have a series of subsequent press interventions.

At the end of Jinga's mandate of Ambassador of Romania to the United Kingdom, the British Parliament issued a motion commending "the work of the outgoing Ambassador of Romania to the UK, Dr Ion Jinga, who has played a significant part in developing relations between the two countries; recognizes Dr Jinga's deep historical understanding of the Romanian-British relationship, and the effective and skilled manner in which he has represented his country and the Romanian community in the UK; notes Dr Jinga's impressive diplomatic and intellectual record; and wishes Dr Jinga well in his future roles". This was the first ever British Parliament commendation of any Romanian ambassador.

Jinga was described soon after his appointment as the Permanent Representative of Romania to the United Nations in New York, as having established himself as an active presence within the UN diplomatic community. Between 2015 and 2016 he chaired the UN Commission on Social Development and, in October 2016, the President of the UN General Assembly appointed him to the position of co-chair of the Intergovernmental Negotiations on the Security Council Reform. This appointment made Ambassador Jinga the first Romanian (and Eastern European) diplomat to chair this highly sensitive and complicated negotiations process. Subsequently, Ion Jinga went on to preside over a number of key UN groups and initiatives. Between 2016 and 2017 he chaired the UN Group of Governmental experts on Transparency of Military Expenditures (MILEX) and between 2017 and 2018 he chaired the UN Commission on Population and Development. In 2018 he took on the role of Chair (elected by acclamation) of the Group of Francophone Ambassadors to the UN, that of Chair of the UN Peacebuilding Commission, and that of Chair of the UN Committee on Disarmament and International Security (First Committee) for the period September 2018 – September 2019.

All of these positions were premieres for the Romanian diplomacy and were seen as indicative for the Romanian Ambassador's leadership and professionalism within the UN. In 2017, in recognition of his activity at the United Nations, Ion Jinga was granted the "Diploma for outstanding contributions to the success of the work of the 71st Session of the United Nations General Assembly" by the General Assembly President. In the same year, the Romanian-American Business Council awarded him the "Best Romanian Diplomat in the United States" Award. In March, 2019, Jinga was elected chair of the committee for the United Nations Population Award, which recognizes outstanding personalities, organizations and institutions with remarkable contributions to solving population's problems. He was subsequently reelected in this position in 2020 and 2021.

== Academic activity and publications ==
Between 1992 and 1995, 1999–2000, 2002–2003, and in 2013, Jinga taught courses within the field of European integration as an associate professor within the National University of Political Studies and Public Administration in Bucharest. Between 2002 and 2003 he also taught as an associate professor within the Diplomatic Academy of the Ministry of Foreign Affairs. Between 2005 and 2008 he was a member of the European Group for Evaluation and Perspectives (a component of the European Institute for International Relations - IERI, Brussels). Since 2019 he is a member of the Promotion committee of IERI. He authored and co-authored five books and over 100 articles in peer-reviewed journals. on topics such as European Integration, Romania at the UN, and the UN priorities. Among them:

In his book "The European Union. Realities and perspectives", published in 1999, the scenario of Romania joining the European Union in 2007 is mentioned for the first time. The book was included in the catalogues of prestigious libraries, such as the Library of Congress, Washington, D.C.; Stanford University Libraries, Stanford, California; Bibilioteca Centrală Universitară 'Eugen Todoran', Timișoara; Biblioteca Centrală Universitară 'Lucian Blaga', Cluj-Napoca, in the references of a number of PhD theses in Romania and the Republic of Moldova, in the European Integration Guide for Professors (the Republic of Moldova), being also cited in the Republic of Moldova's Academy of Sciences' Philosophy, Sociology and Political Sciences Magazine.

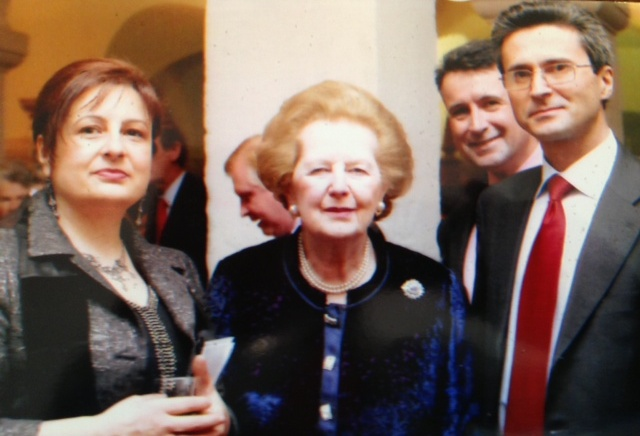
Ion Jinga, Daniela Jinga, and British Prime Minister Margaret Thatcher

His book, "European Integration. Dictionary of Community Terms " (Ed. Lumina Lex, Bucharest, 2000) is the first European integration dictionary published in Romania.

Another of his books, "The European Union looking for future; European studies", published in 2008, has been included by the European Parliament in the online collection entitled "100 Books on Europe to remember". The collection comprises 100 works published over a period of almost a century, considered by the EP as representative for the European idea. Among the book authors in this selection are outstanding personalities of the recent European history, such as Robert Schuman, Jean Monnet, Konrad Adenauer, Charles de Gaulle, Václav Havel, Jacques Delors, Margaret Thatcher, and Romano Prodi. In analyzing the significance of the book, the view of the European Parliament was that "The many honors, decorations and honorary titles Jinga has been awarded throughout his career testify to his exceptional qualities as a diplomat and someone to whom Romania owes recognition since he has represented, and continues to represent, his country's interests in an exemplary manner at crucial times in contemporary European events. Written from the standpoint of an expert directly involved in shaping the Community, this work provides an overview of the most important moments and decisions in European policy making over the period 2003-2007, which led to reform of the EU institutions and whose main aim was to adjust the functioning of an EU of 27 or more Member States to the challenges of the 21st Century."

Ion Jinga gave speeches and held seminars at the University of Valladolid, Spain (2002), the College of Europe in Bruges, Belgium (2003), Free University of Brussels (2004, 2007), London School of Economics (2004), the European Parliament (2004, 2005, 2006), the European Institute of International Relations in Brussels (2007, 2008), Oxford Brookes University (2009), Robert Gordon University, Glasgow (2009), University of Kent (2009), Canterbury Christ Church University (2010), University of Manchester (2011, 2012), University of Oxford (2011), University of Leeds (2011) the International Congress for Human Rights (London 2011), Norwich University (2012), University of York (2012), University of Essex (2012), University of Bedfordshire (2014), London Metropolitan University (2014), University of Sheffield (2014), Coventry (2014), the Santa Marta Group Conference on Modern Slavery (London, 2014), Utah Valley University (Orem, Utah, 2015), St. John's University School of Law (New York, 2016), Columbia University (2016), and Harvard University (2016).

Since 2012, Jinga is the honorary president of the York Romanian Society (the University of York). Since 2011 he is a member of The Atlantic Council of Great Britain (British NGO) and of the Manchester Debating Union (University of Manchester). Since 2010 he is a member of the Mid-Atlantic Club board (London) and a co-patron of the Scottish Romanian Universities Exchange (Edinburgh). Since 2009 he is a founding member of the European Law Romanian Society and from 2003 he is a member of the Scientific College of the Romanian Magazine for EU Law. Between 2005 and 2008 he was a member of the "Groupe Européen d'Evaluation et de Prospective" (GEEP) within the European Institute of International Relations, Brussels. In 2015, he was awarded the title of Honorary Professor of Utah Valley University (Orem, Utah, USA), and, since 2016, he is visiting professor from Practice at St. John's University School of Law, New York, and Honorary President of the Global Romanian Society of Young Professionals (GRASP) - New York.

From both London and New York, Jinga regularly published articles on his Huffington Post blog on topics related to Romanian foreign policy, Romania – UK bilateral relations, EU policies, and the United Nations' main priority areas. He also publishes on Euractiv.ro, Umbrela Strategica and is a columnist in The America Times on topics related to United Nations, Council of Europe, European Union, climate change, sustainable development, environment protection, artificial intelligence, European and Romanian historical events. After Ambassador Ion I. Jinga was appointed Permanent Representative of Romania to the Council of Europe, his articles are also published in the Council of Europe official website in the section “Romania: telling the Council of Europe’s story".

== Honours and awards ==
=== Honours ===
==== National honours ====
- Romanian Royal Family: Knight of the Royal Decoration of the Cross of the Romanian Royal House
- Romania: Officer of the National Order of Merit

==== Foreign honours ====
- Belgium: Knight Grand Cross of the Order of the Crown
- France: Officer of the National Order of Merit

=== Awards ===
==== National awards ====
- Romania: Recipient of the Patriarchal Cross of the Romanian Orthodox Church Medal

==== Foreign awards ====
- United Kingdom:
  - England:
    - London: Freeman of the City of London
  - Scotland: Freeman of the City of Glasgow
  - Jersey: Recipient of the Silver Medal of the States of Jersey

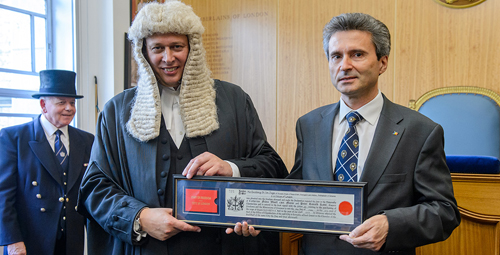
Ion Jinga Freeman of London

In addition, Ion Jinga received the title "Ambassador of the year 2007 in Belgium" (Belgian Award of Diplomatic Excellence 2007), awarded by the "Diplomacy and Global Risk NGO" and the "Diplomatic News" magazine in Brussels. In 2012 he successively received the title "Diplomat of the Year from Europe" by the Diplomat Magazine in London (Diplomat Magazine awards 2012), the Medal "Graduate of Excellence", from the National School for Political and Administrative Studies (NSPAS) in Bucharest (being the first SNSPA graduate to ever receive this distinction), and the title "Diplomat of the Year 2012", awarded by the Minister of Foreign Affairs of Romania on the occasion of celebrating 150 years of Romanian diplomacy. In January 2014, the 'Foreign Policy Romania' magazine named Ambassador Jinga one of the key 100 Romanian personalities who have "moved the country through the power of their ideas or through their own example" in 2013 (he was also mentioned in 2012). He is a member of The Incorporation of Wrights in Glasgow (the oldest Guild in the UK with Charter granted by King Malcolm III in 1057) and of the Guild of Freemen of the City of London. In February 2015, Ion Jinga received the "Diplomat of the Year 2015" Award within the "Political and Public Life Awards" event, organized by the British 'Asian Voice' magazine and hosted by the Rt Hon Keith Vaz, the Chairman of the Home Affairs Select Committee of the House of Commons. The "Political and Public Life Awards" are granted for outstanding professional contributions of personalities working within the fields of politics, social activism, journalism, acting, law, health and culture. In 2021, Ambassador Ion I. Jinga has been awarded the title of Knight Grand Officer of the Royal Order of Francis I, in recognition of his "lifelong commitment to charitable, humanitarian and inter-faith activities in Romania and across the world". The distinction was granted by the Grand Master of the Sacred Military Constantinian Order of St. George, the Duke of Castro and the Grand Prior of the Order, Cardinal Raffaele Martino, at the recommendation made by the Order's Delegation of Great Britain and Ireland.

On 30 August 2017, by Presidential Decree, Ion Jinga was granted the diplomatic rank of Ambassador.
