= Cornel Feruță =

Romanian diplomat (born 1975)

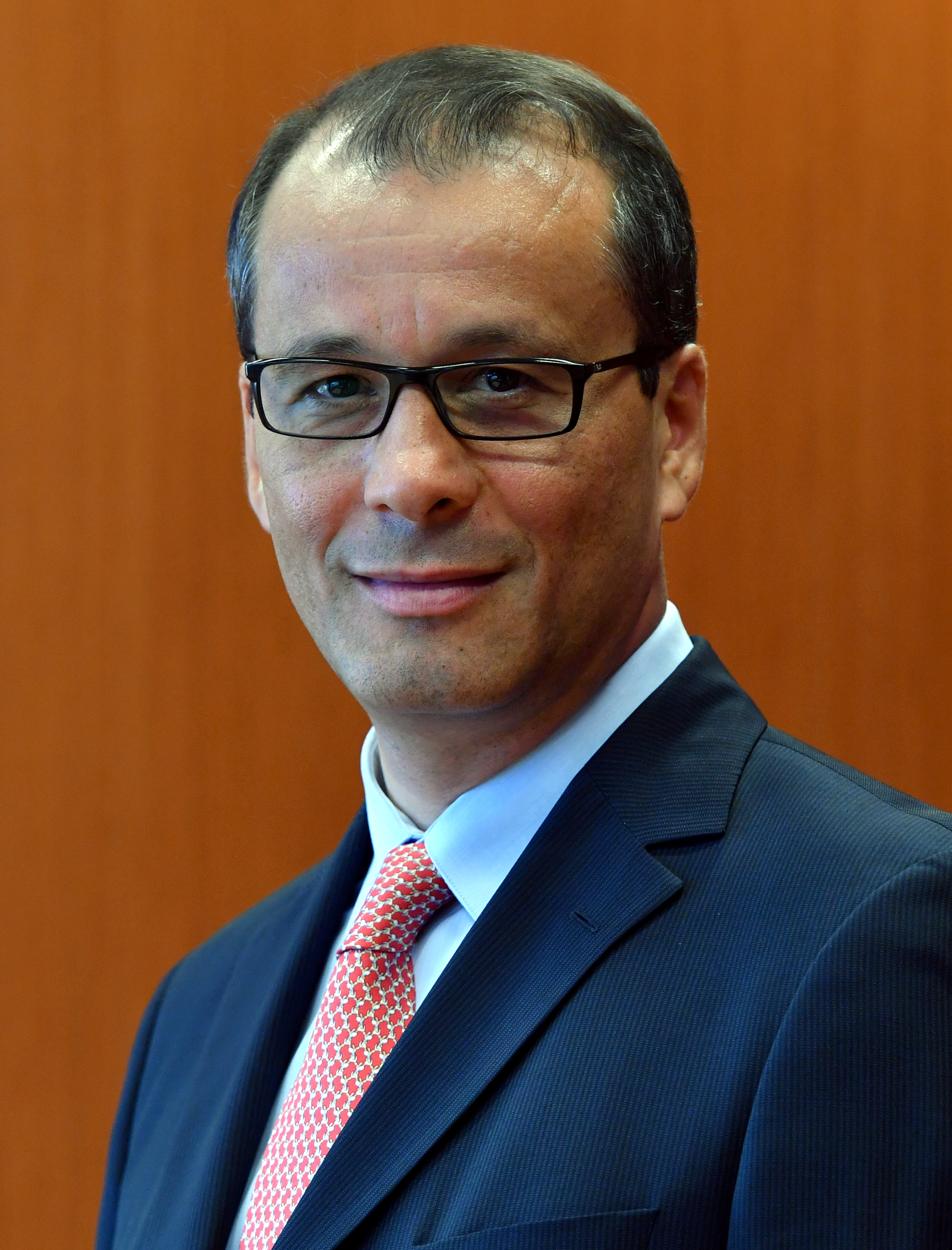

Permanent Representative of Romania to the United Nations in New York
- Incumbent
- Assumed office 16 September 2022
- Preceded by: Ion Jinga

Director General of the International Atomic Energy Agency
- Acting
- In office 25 July 2019 – 2 December 2019
- Preceded by: Yukiya Amano
- Succeeded by: Rafael Grossi

Personal details
- Born: 21 August 1975 (age 50) Balș, Olt County, Socialist Republic of Romania

Cornel Feruță (born 21 August 1975) is a Romanian diplomat. He was the acting Director General of the International Atomic Energy Agency in 2019. In 2022, he became the Permanent Representative of Romania to the United Nations.

== Career ==
He became a member of the Diplomatic Corps of Romania in 1998 and has the diplomatic rank of Ambassador. Between 2007 and 2012 he was Ambassador Extraordinary and Plenipotentiary, Permanent Representative of Romania to International Organizations in Vienna and from September 2013 he held the position of Assistant Director General, Chief Coordinator of the International Atomic Energy Agency (IAEA).

From 25 July 2019 to December 2019, he was acting Director General of IAEA in Vienna. From 2020 to 2022 he served as State Secretary for Global Affairs and Diplomatic Strategies with the Ministry of Foreign Affairs of Romania.

On 16 September 2022, he became the Permanent Representative of Romania to the United Nations.

== Personal life ==
Born in Balș, Olt County, he holds a Bachelor of Arts in political science from the National University of Political Studies and Public Administration in Bucharest and a Master of Arts in international relations from the University of Bucharest.

Feruță is married and has three children.
