= Zaporizhzhia Nuclear Power Plant crisis =

Ongoing nuclear safety crisis during the Russo-Ukrainian war

Coordinates: 47.5083°N 34.5844°E

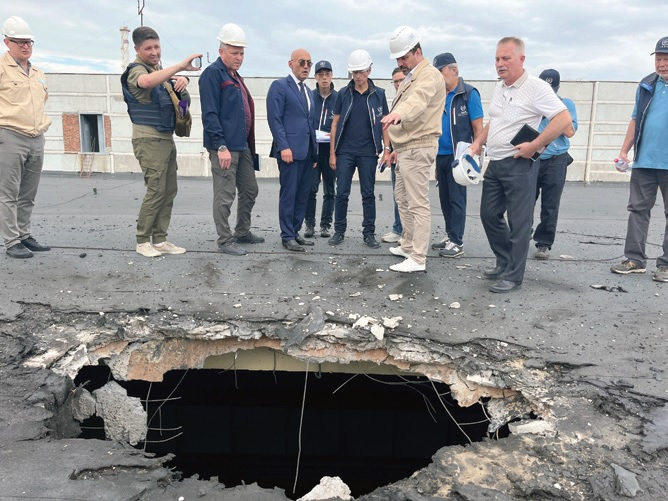
IAEA mission observing shell damage to a building housing solid radioactive waste and fresh nuclear fuel in September 2022

At the beginning of the 2022 Russian invasion of Ukraine, during the Battle of Enerhodar on 4 March 2022, Zaporizhzhia Nuclear Power Plant (ZNPP), the largest nuclear power plant in Europe, was attacked and occupied by Russian forces. It was the first full-scale military attack and occupation of an operational nuclear power plant in history. It has become the center of an ongoing nuclear safety crisis, described by Ukraine as an act of nuclear terrorism by Russia.

Since September 2022, all six reactors have been placed in various states of shutdown, the same month Russia annexed the region in a disputed referendum. In 2025, Russia confirmed its long-term plans for Rosatom to operate the plant, currently operated by Ukrainian Energoatom staff, and in connection to the Russian power grid. Ukrainian forces have made multiple attempts to recapture the plant, and both sides blame each other for direct and indirect attacks on it. ZNPP has seen destruction of its infrastructure via shelling and damage to its power lines. The future of the plant's safety and electricity production is a significant point in the peace negotiations of the war.

Ukrainian authorities call the crisis the largest situation of its kind in history. Experts vary on whether a potential disaster may exceed the scale of previous disasters at nuclear power plants. According to a report by the International Atomic Energy Agency (IAEA), "The situation in Ukraine is unprecedented. It is the first time a military conflict has occurred amid the facilities of a large, established nuclear power program." Nuclear safety expert Attila Aszódi said that an event similar in type and scale to the Chernobyl disaster is technically and physically not possible in the Zaporizhzhia plant, while calling for urgent steps to ensure the safety of the plant. The Bellona Foundation called the crisis "something the world nuclear energy community never thought it would see — and thus never prepared for."

== Timeline ==
=== 2022 ===
The plant has been occupied by Russian forces since 3 March 2022. On 5 July 2022, The Wall Street Journal reported that Russian forces arranged a military base in the complex by deploying heavy self-propelled multiple rocket launcher BM-30 Smerch. On 19–20 July, three Ukrainian suicide drones attacked Russian "Grad" launcher and military tents at the site. Ukraine's Ministry of Defense said that three Russian soldiers were killed and twelve injured. The occupation administration was reported as saying that at least eleven employees were injured. An occupation official said the reactors were not damaged and it was unlikely they were the target.

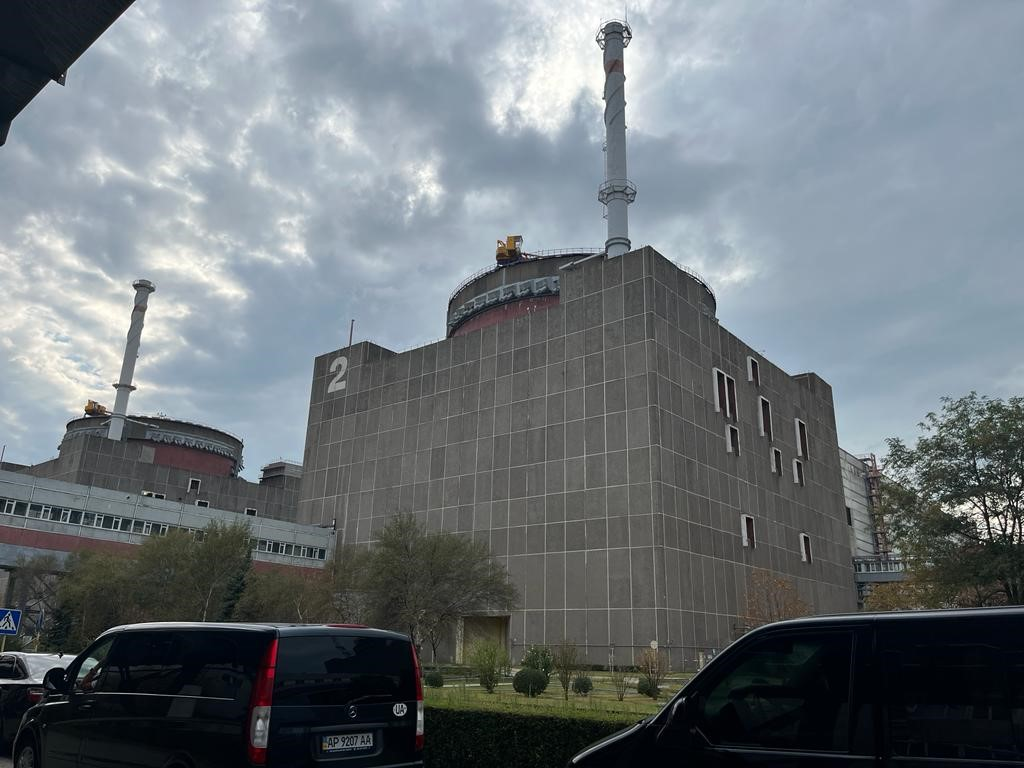
Reactor 2 during the September IAEA inspection

On 3 August 2022, Rafael Grossi, head of the IAEA, expressed grave concerns about the physical integrity of the plant, whether all necessary repairs and maintenance were being done, and the security of nuclear material. A mission to inspect the plant was being planned by the IAEA, waiting on approval by Ukrainian and Russian sides, as well as United Nations authorisation. Energoatom opposed an IAEA visit because "any visit would legitimise Russia's presence there". Occupation official Yevhen Balytskyi invited IAEA to visit to show how the Russians were guarding the facility while Ukrainians were attacking it. On 5 August the 750 kV electrical switchboard at the plant was shelled, causing three transformers to shutdown and one of the three operating reactors to be disconnected from the grid, and triggering its emergency protection system.

On 8 August, damage was reported at the plant. Ukrainian authorities said that Russian shelling had damaged three radiation sensors and left a worker hospitalised; Ukrainian President Volodymyr Zelenskyy accused Russia of waging "nuclear terror". Local Russian-backed authorities said that Ukrainian forces had hit the site with a multiple rocket launcher, damaging administrative buildings and an area near a nuclear storage facility. UN secretary general Guterres said "any attack to a nuclear plant is a suicidal thing", calling for IAEA inspectors to be given access. Energoatom called for a demilitarised zone around the plant with international peacekeepers deployed.

On 9 August, the head of Energoatom said that Russia planned to disconnect the station from the Ukrainian grid and connect it to the Russian grid.

On 11 August, Russia called a meeting of the United Nations Security Council to discuss the situation at the plant. The Russian delegation stated that Ukrainian forces had on 5 August used heavy artillery to shell the plant, and on 6 August attacked with cluster munitions; they supported a visit by the IAEA. The Ukrainian delegation stated that Russia had "staged shelling of the nuclear power plant", that Russia used the plant to shell Ukrainian towns, and they also supported a visit by the IAEA traveling through Ukrainian controlled territory. The United Arab Emirates delegation reiterated that Article 56 of the Geneva Conventions Protocol I outlawed attacks on nuclear electrical-generating stations. Grossi said the situation was "very alarming" but there was no immediate threat to nuclear safety, though the situation could change.

Also on 11 August, the plant was shelled several times, including near where radioactive materials were stored. Ukraine said that Russia did the shelling, while Russian officials said that Ukraine did it. On 14 August, Zelenskyy accused Russia of stationing troops at the plant to fire at the cities of Nikopol and Marhanets across Kakhovka Reservoir. In the second half of August a video emerged that showed Russian military trucks and armored vehicles parked in buildings that housed generating turbines, later confirmed in the IAEA inspection.

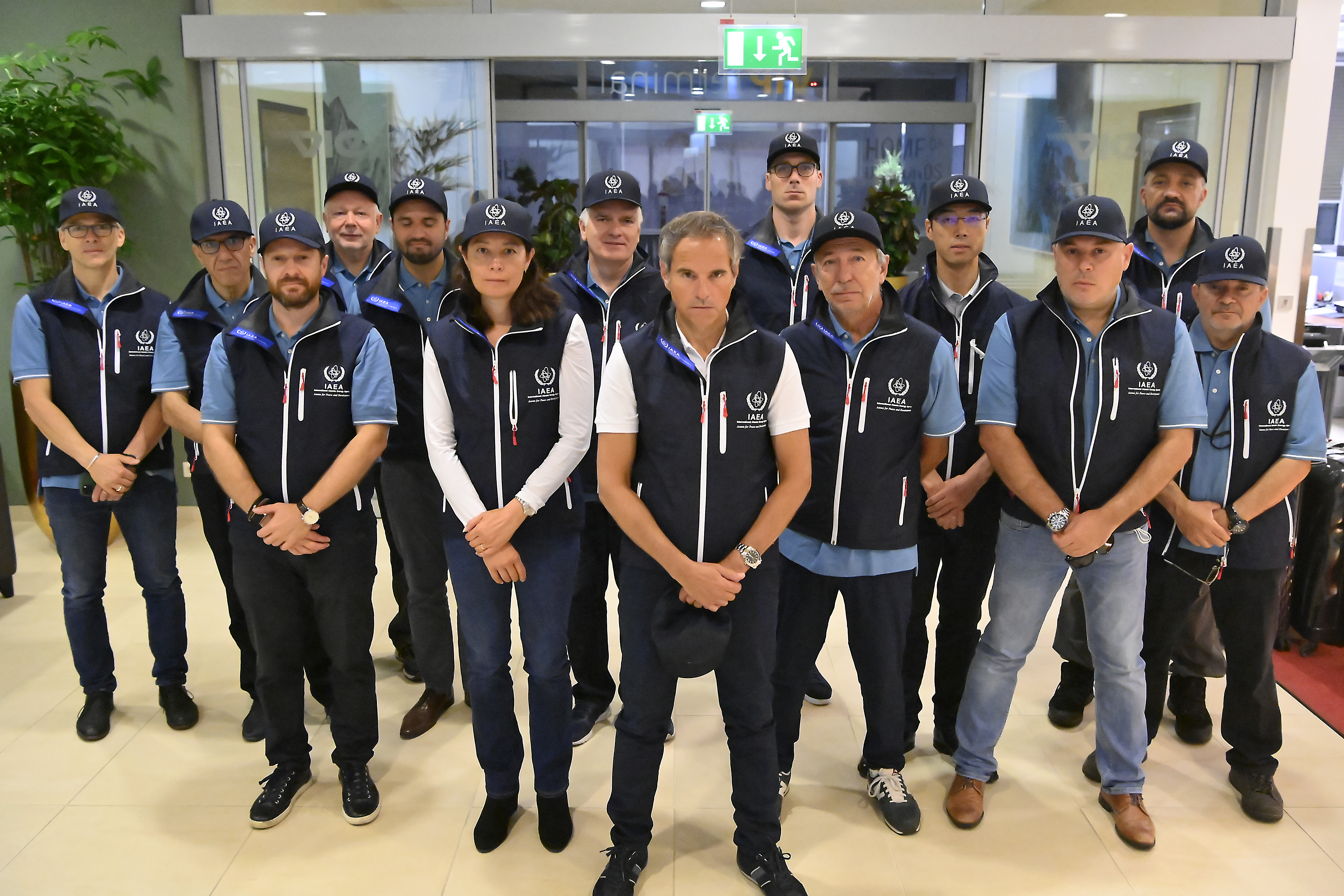
IAEA expert mission leaving Vienna on 29 August 2022. Director-General Rafael Grossi at front; Head of the Department of Nuclear Safety and Security Lydie Evrard in long sleeves; Head of the Department of Safeguards Massimo Aparo with white shoelaces.

On 19 August, Russia agreed to allow IAEA inspectors access to the Zaporizhzhia plant from Ukrainian-held territory, after a phone call between the President of France, Emmanuel Macron, and Russian president, Vladimir Putin. A temporary ceasefire around the plant still needed to be agreed for the inspection. Russia reported that 12 attacks with over 50 artillery shells explosions had been recorded at the plant and the staff town of Enerhodar, by 18 August.

Also on 19 August, Tobias Ellwood, chair of the UK's Defence Select Committee, said that any deliberate damage to the Zaporizhzhia nuclear plant that could cause radiation leaks would be a "breach" of Article 5 of the North Atlantic Treaty, according to which an attack on a member state of NATO is considered an attack on all of them. The next day, United States congressman Adam Kinzinger said that any radiation leak would kill people in NATO countries, which would be an automatic activation of Article 5.

Shelling hit coal ash dumps at the neighbouring coal-fired power station on 23 August, and ash was on fire by 25 August. The 750-kV transmission line to the Dniprovska substation, which was the only one of the four 750-kV transmission lines that had not yet been damaged and cut by military action, passes over the ash dumps. At 12:12pm on 25 August the line cut off due to the fire below, disconnecting the plant and its two operating reactors from the national grid for the first time since it started operating in 1985. In response, reactor 5's back-up generators and coolant pumps started up, and reactor 6 reduced generation. Incoming power was still available via the 330-kV line to the substation at the coal-fired station, so the diesel generators were not essential for cooling reactor cores and spent fuel pools. The 750-kV line and reactor 6 resumed operation at 12:29pm, but the line was cut by fire again two hours later. The line, but not the reactors, resumed operation again later that day. On 26 August, one reactor restarted in the afternoon and another in the evening, resuming electricity supplies to the grid. The reactors and spent fuel pools depend on water from the Kakhovka Reservoir for cooling. The reservoir is created by the Kakhovka Hydroelectric Power Plant dam, which is a main conflict location of the two war participants.

==== IAEA inspection ====
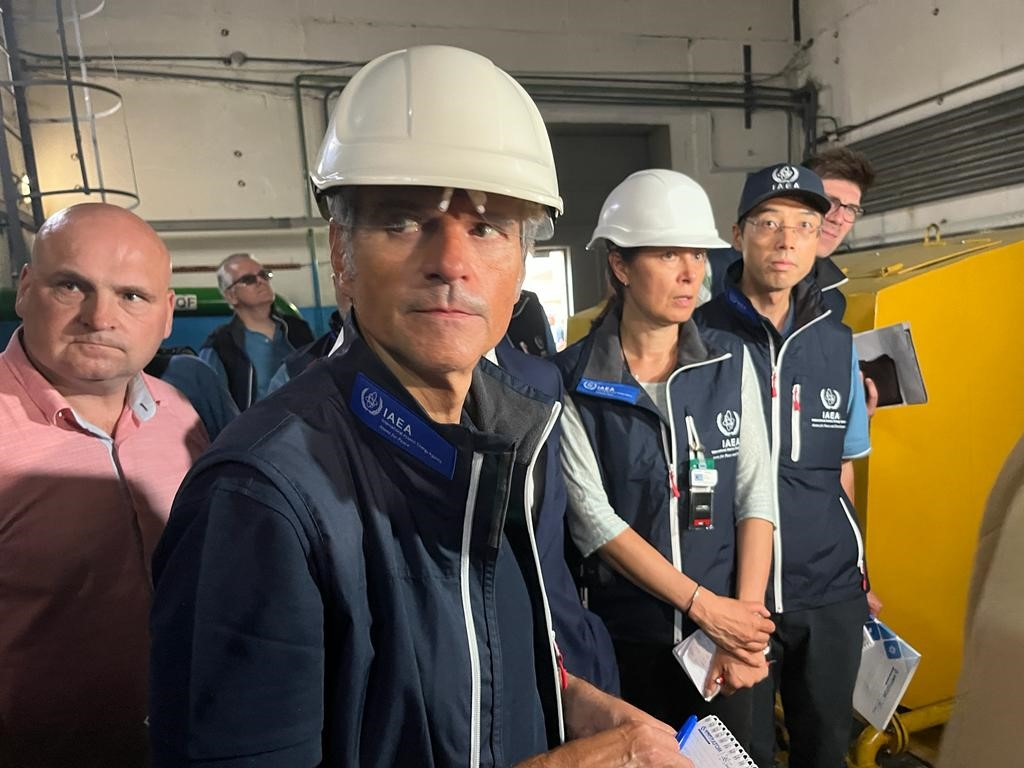
Grossi, Evrard and IAEA mission team members at the plant on 1 September 2022

On 29 August, an IAEA expert mission led by Rafael Grossi left Vienna. On 1 September 2022, the IAEA team passed through the frontline in armoured white land cruisers, where they were held at the first checkpoint outside Zaporizhzhia because of shelling reports. In the previous few days the staff town of Enerhodar had been under intense shelling. Grossi said he was aware of "increased military activity in the area" but would press ahead with the visit. Russia accused Ukraine of trying to seize the plant that morning with 60 troops crossing the Dnieper river at 6 am local time. Energoatom said Russian shelling of the plant had forced the shutdown of one of the two operating reactors. The IAEA team arrived at 1 pm and commenced the inspection. Grossi said that the "plant and physical integrity of the plant" had been "violated several times" and that IAEA inspectors would remain at the site.

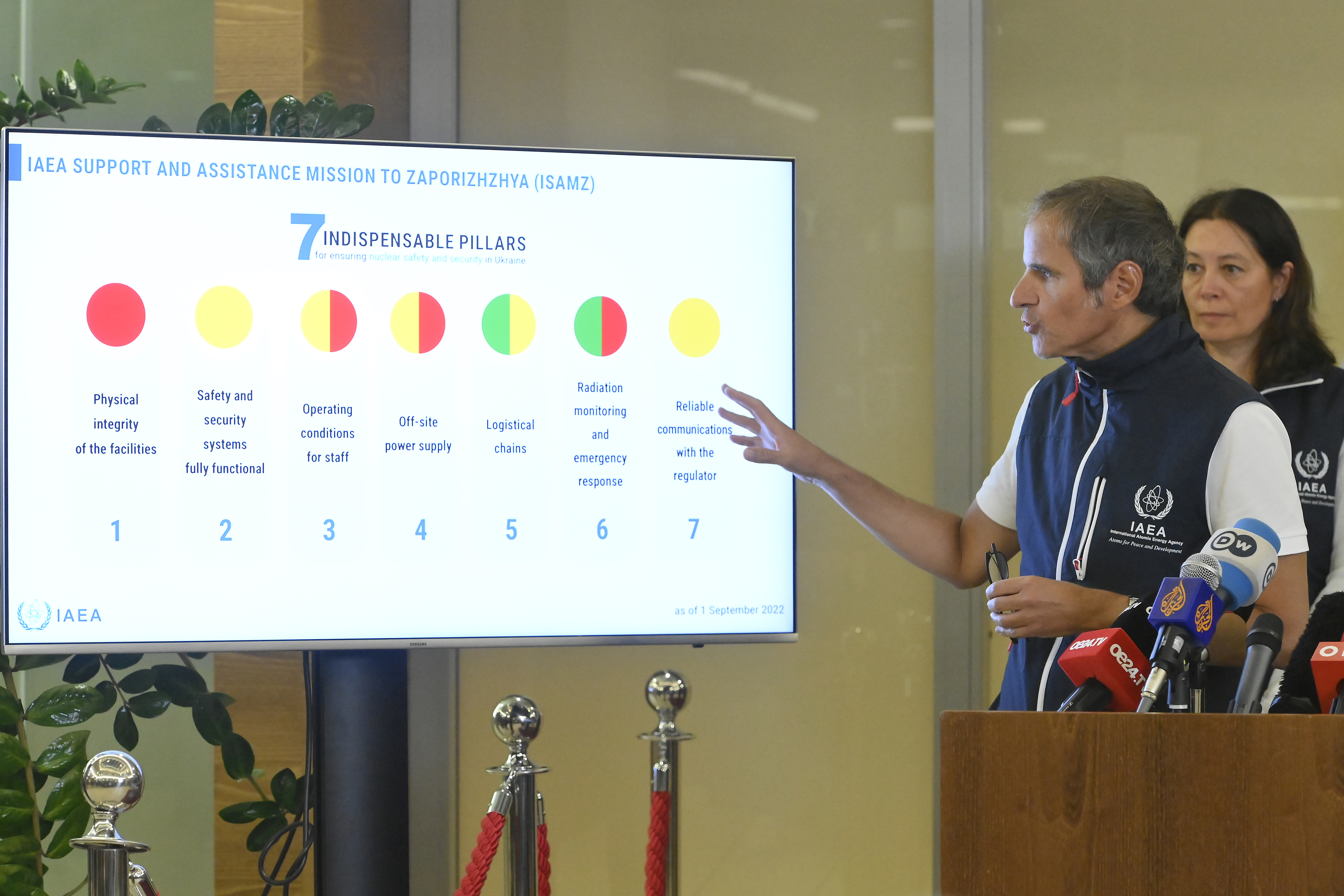
IAEA Director-General Grossi's press conference on 2 September 2022

On 2 September, Russia said IAEA inspectors will be allowed to remain permanently at the nuclear plant. Ukrainian president Zelenskyy criticised the IAEA for not yet calling for the demilitarisation of the plant. At a press conference that evening just after arriving back in Vienna, Grossi said six inspectors had remained at the plant, and two of those would stay permanently. They had been able to see all parts of the plant they requested to see, and the plant's staff worked in an admirable and professional way with the Russian occupier's nuclear experts. He said that some plant staff had decided to leave, while others continue to work; two reactors continue to operate. Physical damage had occurred at the plant, and the level of military operations in the region is increasing and on site there were references to military offensives and counter-offensives which concerns him a lot. He said inspectors would have a stabilising effect, but they could not stop the war or give the plant back to the Ukrainian authorities. Energoatom responded by stating the IAEA inspectors were manipulated and lied to by the Russian authorities.

On 2 September, Ukraine's armed forces' general staff said that it carried out precision strikes around the staff town of Enerhodar. That night or the following night Russian "Grad" MLRS launchers were filmed firing from the area of the nuclear power plant.

On 3 September, Russia stated that it foiled a landing attempt by Ukrainian force of over 250 marines at about 11 pm that evening by using helicopters and fighter jets, destroying 20 vessels and scattering others. Details of the landing operation different in time and across the media (TASS reported 15-40 speedboats, Russian MoD reported 7 speedboats), and no photographic or video evidence was presented for the landing, apart from a single video which was later revealed as staged.

In the early hours of 3 September shelling cut the Dniprovska power line, the last working 750 kV power line from the plant, however electricity production continued using a 330 kV reserve power line via the nearby Zaporizhzhia thermal power station. A reactor was disconnected from the grid in the afternoon, leaving one in operation. Energoatom said that reactor five had been disconnected from the grid due to "non-stop shelling by occupying Russian forces".

On 5 September, the IAEA reported that more shells hit the plant. The 330 kV reserve power line to the Zaporizhzhia thermal power station was temporarily disconnected while extinguishing a fire, with the sole operating reactor providing electricity for safety systems. As planned, four inspectors left leaving the two permanent IAEA inspectors at the plant.

On 7 September Centre for Information Resilience published a report analyzing the available open source footage of the shelling incidents over the last few months and concluded that the evidence such as direction of impact craters indicates the shelling originated from Russia-controlled areas, which is consistent with observed presence of Russian weapons such as MLRS on these areas.

==== September 2022 IAEA report ====
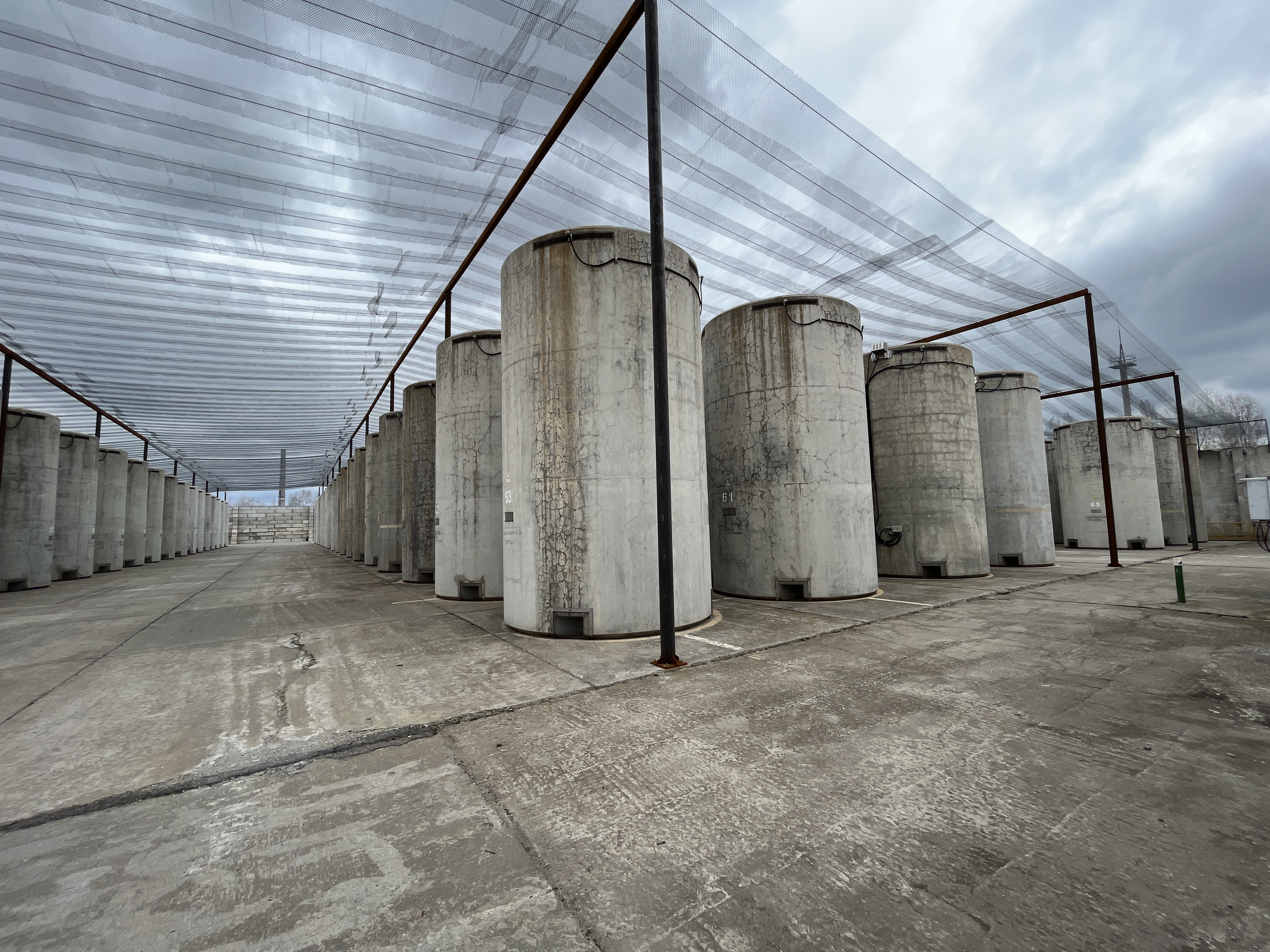
The dry cask storage facility for spent nuclear fuel at the plant

On 6 September, the IAEA issued a report on the nuclear facilities in Ukraine. The report's main conclusion was that the occupation of the plant by Russian armed forces violates all seven pillars of nuclear safety

- In March during the Russian siege of the plant damaged training center, laboratory and administrative building were damaged by projectiles. During following months Russian cruise missiles were observed flying over the plant (but targeted elsewhere). In July Russian troops placed significant amounts of military equipment in the turbine halls of the plant as well as a number of armored vehicles outside. In August shelling damaged nitrogen-oxygen station, external power supplies, switchboards, transformers, spent fuel facility and cabling used by radiation monitoring system. Up to 40 units of military vehicles were located at the plant. A number of other damages were observed by the IAEA plant during 3 September.
- Russian troops took control over the plant's security and access control systems. IAEA noted that plant's security systems should be operated "as designed and licensed" under Ukrainian legislation, and that presence of military vehicles inside plant violates operations of safety and security equipment of the plant.
- IAEA noted presence of 11 staff from Rosatom who was demanding daily reports and "confidential information" from the plant's personnel, including details on the plants access control systems, operations, fuel and waste management and administrative procedures, creating "interference with the normal lines of operational command or authority". The situation had negative impact on the plant's staff, who has been working under significant and prolonged stress and pressure which can lead to increased likelihood of human error. The IAEA condemned violent acts carried out "at or near the ZNPP or against its staff". The mission also highlighted that the operating staff has limited access to numerous areas of the plant which are controlled by Russian military which hinders ability to repair damages.
- Up to 40% positions related to physical protection were not staffed, with 907 people currently available for three shifts while normal staffing level was 1230. Insufficient number of fire brigade employees (80 vs normal 150) created a need to increase working shifts from 24 to 48 hours.
- Two out of four main high-voltage lines were damaged during early occupation of the plant. Later, a third line was damaged. IAEA assessed that having in total five external supply lines the plant is safe to operate, but the safety margin has been limited. The plant also has 20 emergency diesel generators, some of which have been used during various shelling incidents damaging parts of the supply system.
- Supply chains to and from the plant, including fuel, waste and spare parts, were interrupted by the occupation and delivery of spare parts for diesel generators became "extremely difficult" and possible mostly thanks to personal arrangements of the staff. Otherwise, material reserves of the plant were sufficient at 98.5%.
- Apart from 24-hours' interruption caused by shelling, the radiation monitoring systems were operating as expected. Plants emergency center has been occupied by the military administration. Communications of the plant management with the Ukraine's nuclear regulator were frequently disrupted and later limited to mobile phone and email channels, subject to interference by the occupying military. No regulatory inspections have been possible since occupation started.

On 15 September, the IAEA Board of Governors passed a resolution calling on Russia to leave the power plant. The resolution was supported by 26 countries and opposed by 2 (Russia and China).

==== 2022 shutdown ====
After the publication of the IAEA report, as shelling of the plant continued, the plant was operating disconnected from the grid in "island mode" for a few days. In that mode the last operational reactor was used to power the plant's own safety systems. On 11 September, at 3.14am, the sixth and final reactor was disconnected from the grid, "completely stopping" the plant. The statement from Energoatom said that "Preparations are underway for its cooling and transfer to a cold state". Both sides continued to blame each other for the military action in and around the plant.

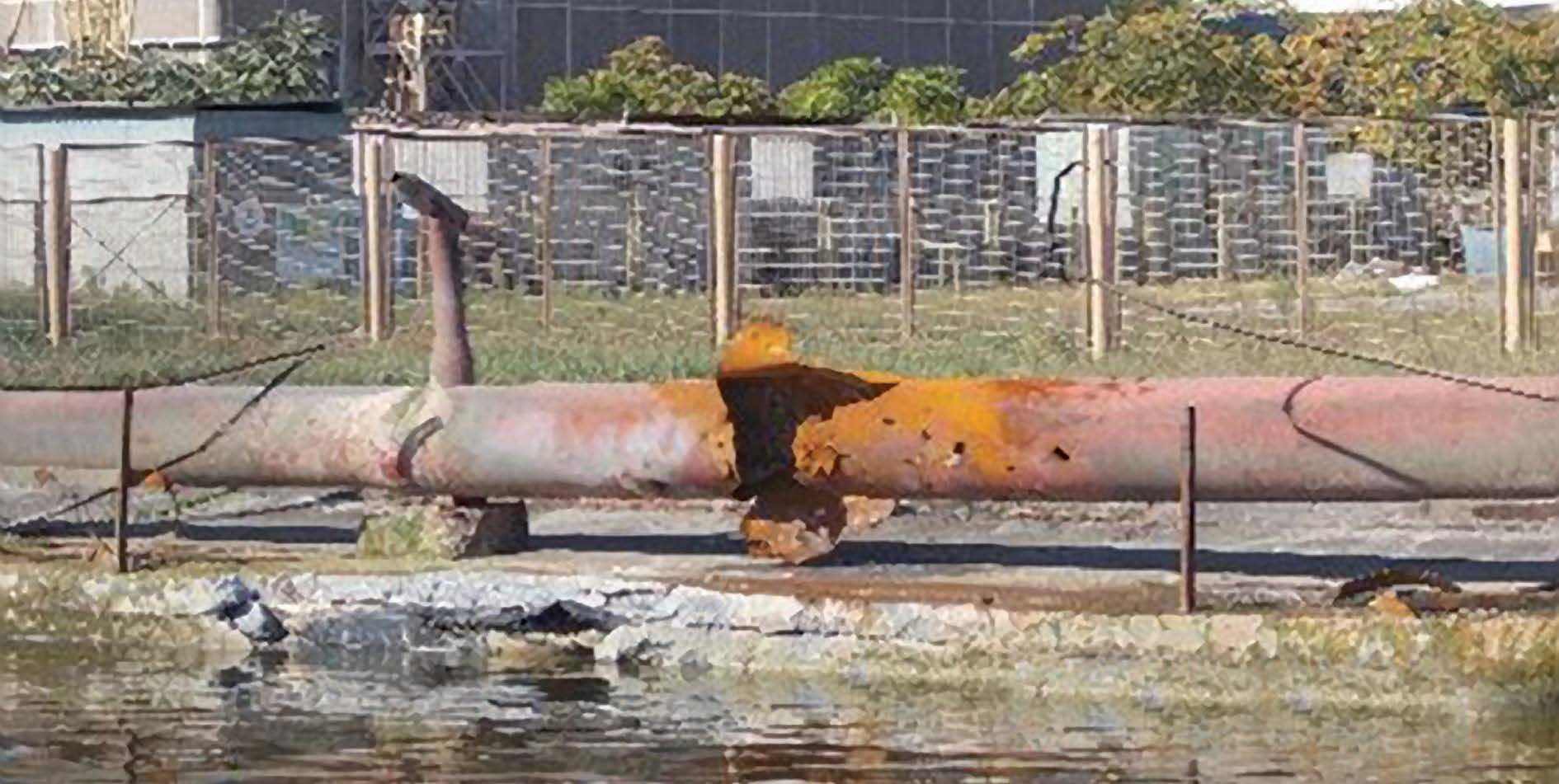
A broken pipeline on the site damaged by 21 September shelling

On 21 September, shelling within the plant damaged cables near unit 6 turbine hall, temporarily causing two of unit 6's three emergency diesel generators to run for about 40 minutes to provide power while repairs were made. The other five reactors were not affected. The previous day shelling took one of the reactor cooling ponds out of service.

On 30 September, Ihor Murashov, director general of the plant, was detained by Russian soldiers. Energoatom said that Murashov's arrest threatened the safety of the plant, and accused Russia of attempting to transfer control of the plant to the Russian company Rosatom. He was released within a few days and was evacuated to territory controlled by Ukraine.

==== Autumn 2022 Potential restart ====
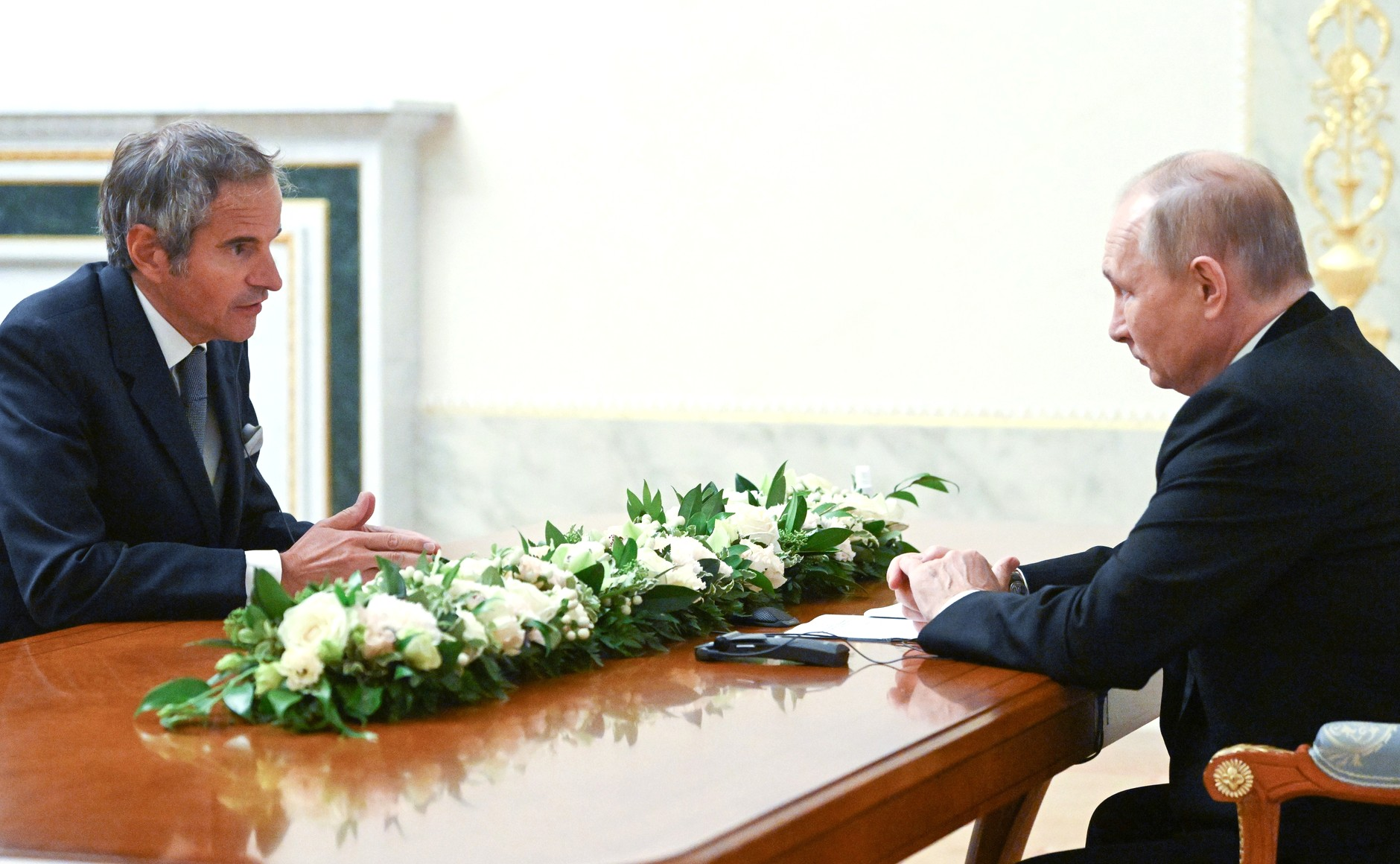
Grossi with Russian President Vladimir Putin on 11 October 2022

On 5 October, the Associated Press reported that in an interview, Energoatom President Petro Kotin said that the energy company could restart two of the reactors within days, with a decision to be made as early as 12 October, to protect safety installations. Kotin said that due to low temperatures over the coming winter, safety equipment will be damaged without heating, and that the only heating will come from the reactors.

On the same day, Russian President Vladimir Putin decreed the takeover of the plant, and designated it as federal property. The head of Energoatom also announced the takeover. The decree said that after the accession of Zaporizhzhia Oblast to the Russian Federation a new company would be formed, headed by the former chief engineer of Balakovo Nuclear Power Plant which has similar nuclear reactors. Existing operating licences would continue until new ones were issued in accordance with Russian laws.

Ukraine called this an illegal attempt to take over the plant and called for sanctions against Rosatom and other Russian nuclear companies. Energoatom transferred administrative control of the plant to its headquarters in Kyiv.

On 6 October, IAEA Director General Grossi had a meeting with Ukrainian president Zelenskyy in Kyiv to discuss developments regarding the ownership of the plant and IAEA's proposal of a nuclear safety and security protection zone around the plant. Grossi then met Russian President Putin in Moscow on 11 October, after which Grossi decided to meet with Zelenskyy again.

On 8 October, the plant lost its connection to external power supplies due to shelling, and backup diesel generators started. Each backup diesel generator has fuel to operate for 10 days, but not all need to be operated. The following day, a 750 kV power line was repaired and connected to the grid. The IAEA reported that almost every day there was shelling in the region of the plant, and that a landmine had exploded outside the plant, part of a series of landmine blasts in recent weeks. On 12 October, the plant again lost its connection to external power supplies due to shelling, the second time in a week.

==== October 2022 Ukrainian attack ====
Russia’s Ministry of Defence reported a Ukrainian attempt to land troops at the plant from across the Dnipro River on 19 October 2022, reporting that Ukraine lost 90 troops and 14 boats in the attempt. Ukraine denied this at the time. However The Times later confirmed the operation in 2023, after interviewing Ukrainian participants, reporting that on the night of 19 October, about 600 elite Ukrainian troops crossed the Dnipro River in over 30 armoured boats in an attack to try to recapture the power plant, supported by HIMARS missiles and artillery shell attacks onto the shoreline near Enerhodar. However most of the boats were forced to retreat under fire before landing, and only a small number of Ukrainian special forces reached the shore as dawn broke, engaging in a three hour long firefight on the outskirts of Enerhodar before retreating. The Russian MOD stated there had been three earlier smaller Ukrainian failed attempts at landing troops across the river, on 1, 2-3 and 8–9 September 2022. The first on 1 September had delayed the arrival of the first IAEA inspection team.

On 9 October 2023, just under a year later, chief of Ukraine’s Main Directorate of Intelligence Kyrylo Budanov stated that Ukrainian intelligence units had made three failed attempts to capture Enerhodar and the Zaporizhzhia nuclear power plant in August 2022 and later. Specialist foreign soldiers of the International Legion participated in the third attack.

==== November 2022 shelling ====
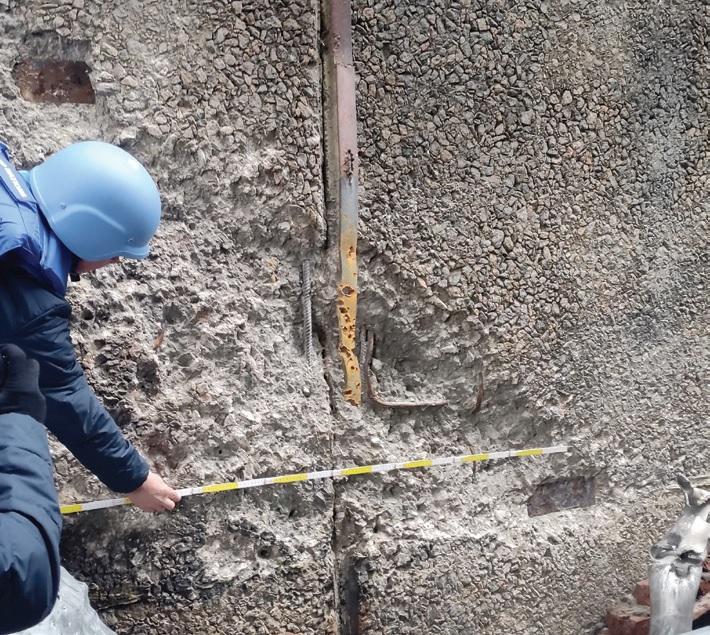
Shell damage on a Unit 4 reactor building wall from 19–20 November 2022, being measured by IAEA mission staff

On 19 and 20 November the nuclear power plant was subjected to the most intense bombing in months, as the head of the IAEA reported. IAEA experts reported more than a dozen blasts, with "damage in several places", but none so far critical for nuclear safety as the external power supplies were not affected and radiation levels remained normal. The IAEA said the forces behind the shelling were "playing with fire" and called for "urgent measures to help prevent a nuclear accident" in the Russian-occupied plant.

Russia and Ukraine blamed each other for shelling the Russian-controlled plant. Russia claimed that the large-calibre shells came from the Ukrainian-controlled city of Marhanets. The Ukrainian nuclear energy agency said that Russia was responsible for the shelling, which they claimed had damaged exactly the infrastructure needed to restore energy production for Ukrainian needs.

=== 2023 ===
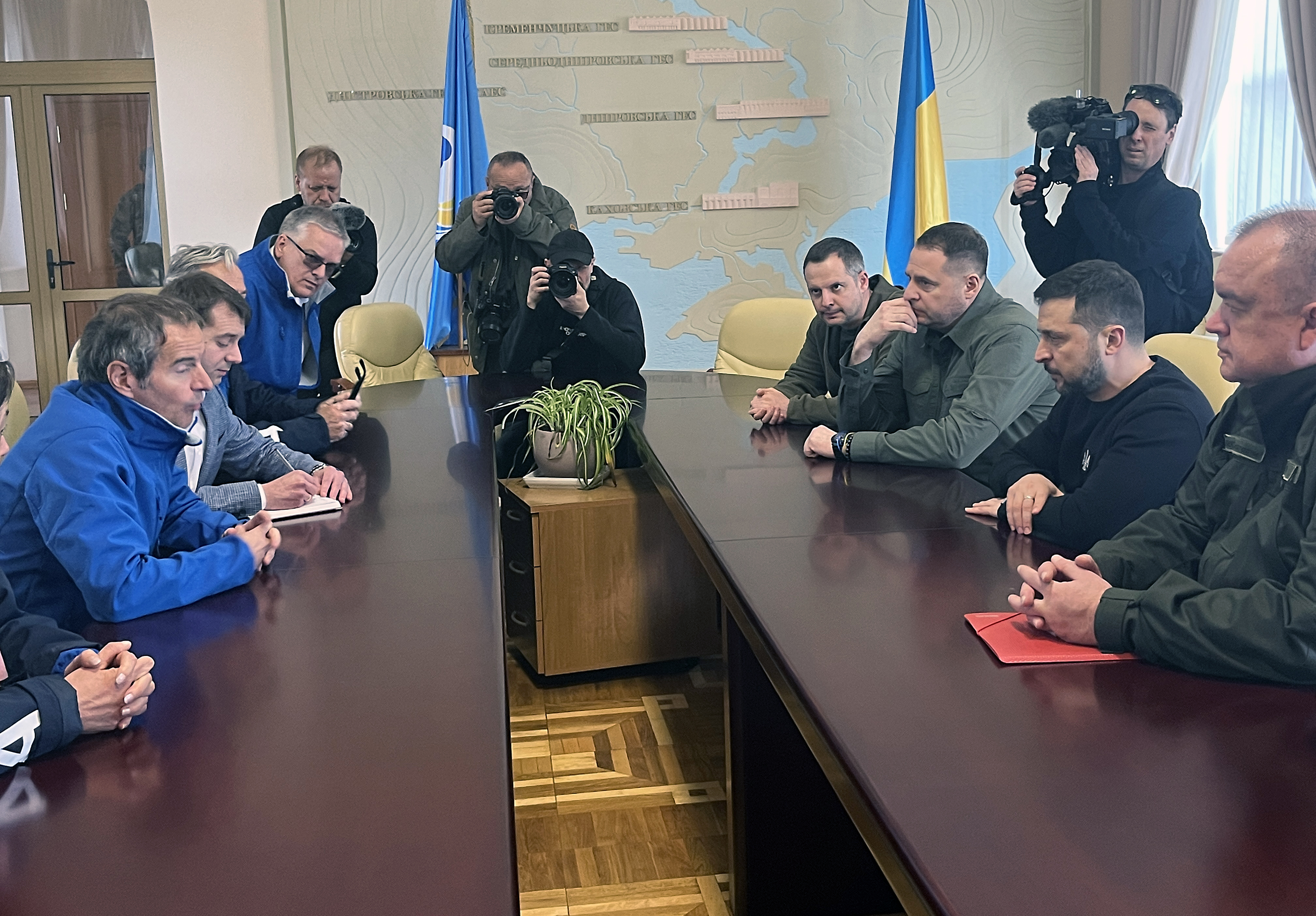
Grossi with Ukrainian President Volodymyr Zelenskyy in the city of Zaporizhzhia on 27 March 2023

==== UNSC May 2023 meeting ====
On 30 May 2023, Rafael Grossi, IAEA Director General, updated the United Nations Security Council on the situation. Military activities had continued with the loss of off-site power forcing the use of emergency diesel generators on seven occasions to operate essential spent fuel and reactor cooling, most recently a week previously. It had not been possible to get both sides to agree the details of a demilitarised safety and security zone around the plant. Instead Grossi asked both sides to agree to the principles:

1. no attack from or against the plant;
2. no use of the plant as storage nor as a base for heavy weapons or military personnel;
3. no placement of off-site power at risk;
4. the protection of all essential structures, systems and components from attacks or sabotage;
5. no action which undermines these principles.

Grossi requested and received UNSC support these principles. IAEA onsite experts, currently on their eighth rotation, will broaden their remit to report on breaches of these principles, which he would publicly report. There was increasing talk of more military action in the area, and he believed this was the bare minimum appropriate response to the threat. Grossi said that to date the IAEA team had not seen heavy military equipment onsite.

The Ukrainian representative accused Russia of intimidating plant personnel, shelling the plant and mining its perimeter; and that 50 heavy weapons were in the turbine buildings of units 1, 2 and 4 of the plant. He said that Grossi's five principles should have included the requirement for the withdrawal of Russian troops and other personnel at the plant. The Russian representative said they had supported the demilitarised safety and security zone plan, but that the unwillingness of Ukraine to negotiate had thwarted the initiative. He said there had never been any heavy weapons at the plant.

==== 2023 Kakhovka Dam breach ====
On 6 June 2023, the Kakhovka Dam was breached causing the depletion of the plant's main water source, the Kakhovka Reservoir, which is expected to be too low to use within a few days, though there are several alternative sources adequate for essential cooling water while the reactors are in the current shutdown state. The IAEA Director General said "Our current assessment is that there is no immediate risk to the safety of the plant".

In July 2023, the cooling pond level was decreasing by 1–2 cm per day, which leaves sufficient water for several months. The IAEA reported plans to construct additional wells at the site to provide essential cooling water. In October 2023, the IAEA reported that 11 recently completed underground wells were in operation, sufficient for all 12 sprinkler cooling ponds.

==== 2023 shutdown ====
It was reported that the sixth reactor was being kept in hot shutdown at 200 °C, to make it easier to restart if necessary and to provide winter heating to Enerhodar. Two days later, on 8 June, the sixth reactor was put into cold shutdown as a safety precaution due to nearby flooding and shelling. As of 4 July the 750 kV electric grid has been reconnected, which ensures routine operations of all plants safety systems in addition to the existing backup sources.

As of mid July 2023, unit 5 was in hot shutdown, which the IAEA reported was necessary to produce steam for nuclear safety purposes, including the processing of liquid radioactive waste in storage tanks. It is planned to move unit 4 from cold to hot shutdown, to allow unit 5 to be placed in cold shutdown for regular preventative maintenance activities. The IAEA is urging the investigation of whether an external boiler can be installed as an alternative to keeping one unit in hot shutdown.

In October 2023, a second reactor, unit 5 again after maintenance, was being brought into hot shutdown to provide additional warm water and district heating for the upcoming winter season. The procurement of an alternative external steam generator has started, but installation is not expected until early 2024. The IAEA team reported they had heard four explosive blasts near the site in mid October.

==== 2023 Sabotage threats ====
In June and July 2023 Ukraine and Russia frequently blamed each other of preparing a sabotage or false flag operation at the plant. On 21 June IAEA confirmed "previous placement of mines outside the plant perimeter" and also "at particular places inside", but assessed these as not having a significant impact on the plant's operational safety. On 5 July IAEA monitoring mission in the plant did not confirm presence of land mines or explosives on the territory of the plant but highlighted it does not have full access to all areas. IAEA specifically requested access to the rooftops of reactor blocks 3 and 4, turbine halls and specific parts of the cooling system, which were previously described as locations of Russian military presence. On 4 August the IAEA reported their team had unimpeded access to the rooftops of units 3 and 4, with views of the turbine hall rooftops, and no military presence was found.

On 6 July American Nuclear Society analysis indicated that even the worst case scenario, including shelling and deliberate sabotage to the reactors or spent fuel storage, radiation leaks that would have health impacts for population are very unlikely due to numerous redundant safety features of the plant and the fact it's in cold shutdown.

=== 2024 ===
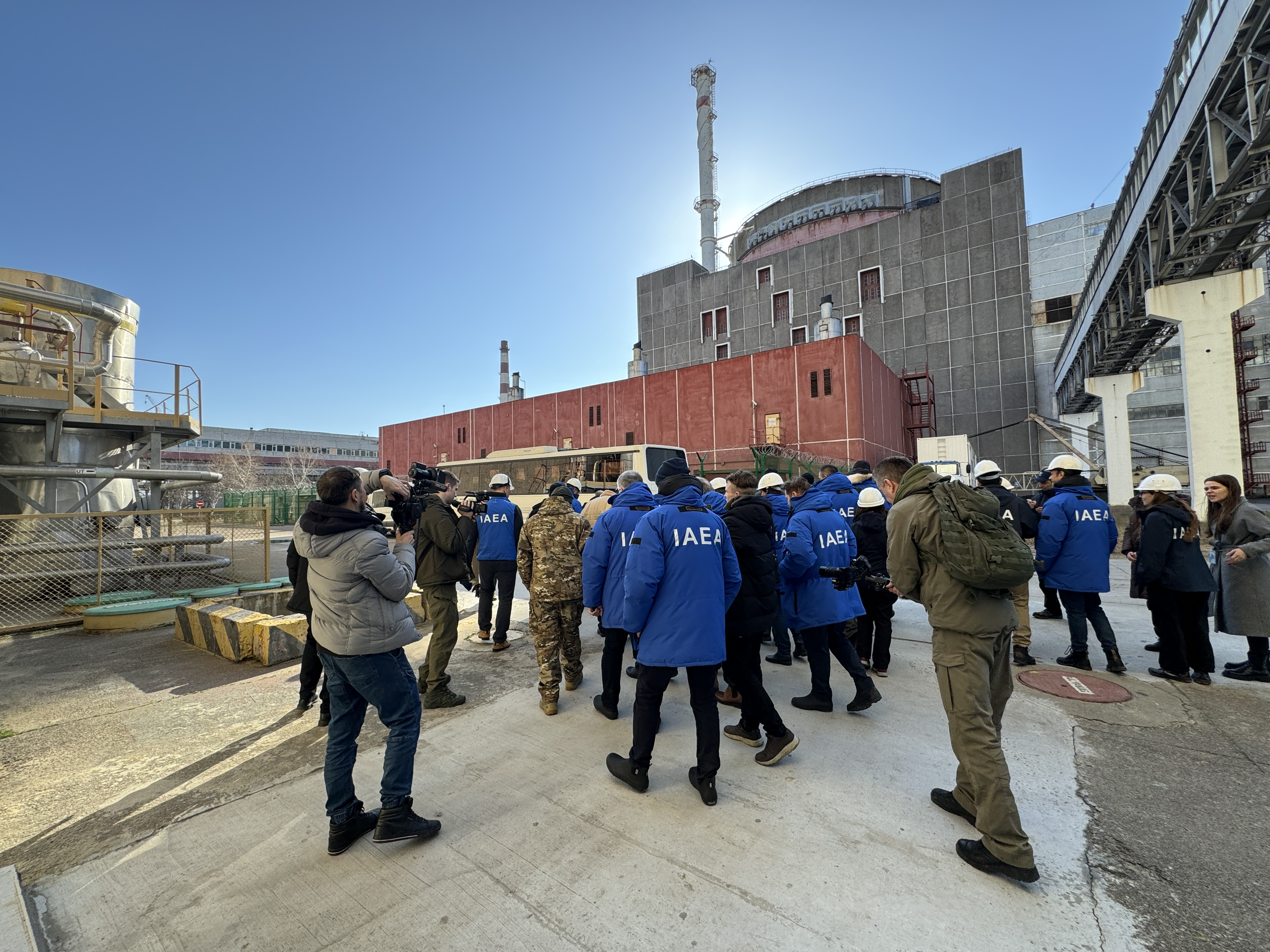
Grossi and his team of experts at the plant on 7 February 2024

In 2024, Russian forces continued to control the facility while IAEA teams maintained a monitoring presence. Russia has repeatedly accused Ukraine of attacking the facility. These accusations include drone strikes and shelling, with Russia claiming that Ukraine is endangering nuclear safety. Ukraine denies these claims, asserting that Russia is conducting a disinformation campaign and is itself responsible for attacks on the plant.

On 7 April 2024, there were confirmed drone strikes on the Zaporizhzhia plant. The IAEA Director-General Rafael Mariano Grossi reported on the incident, stating that the drones struck several buildings, including a "direct hit on the reactor dome of Unit 6". This was the first direct targeting of the Zaporizhzhia plant since November 2022. The responsibility for these attacks remains unclear.

In a June 2024 update, the IAEA team reported continuing to hear fighting in the area and that a land mine at the site had recently detonated for undisclosed reasons. As of the 13 June 2024 update, all six units were in cold shutdown.

On 3 July 2024, Zaporizhzhia plant's Russian management reported additional drone strikes, resulting in injuries to eight employees. The IAEA's report on the incident did not attribute the attack to any specific drone operator. Ukraine did not comment on the matter.

On 11 August 2024, the IAEA team reported that the Russian operators informed it that "an alleged drone attack on one of the plant’s cooling towers took place". The agency noted that "strong dark smoke" was observed, but confirmed there was no immediate threat to nuclear safety. Ukrainian and Russian authorities exchanged blame for the incident, each accusing the other of attacking the plant. On 12 August IAEA observers inspected the base of the cooling tower and concluded the fire started at the cold water sprinklers level at 10 metres from the ground. The team said the Russian operators did not allow it to inspect this level for safety reasons. The observers secured the remains of burnt plastic but did not observe any remains of tyres or the drone. The director of the facility, Yuri Chernichuk, said a Ukrainian drone that was attacking the Zaporizhzhia plant may have carried flammable liquid. As of 5 September, IAEA observers have not been granted access to the damaged cooling tower in full.

On 4 October 2024, the Ukrainian Main Directorate of Intelligence assassinated the head of security at ZNPP, Ukrainian national Andrei Korotkiy, in a car bomb attack in Russian-controlled Enerhodar.

On 10 December 2024 an IAEA vehicle was hit by a Russian drone while driving IAEA observers team to ZNPP for rotation. The attack happened on the Ukrainian side, 8 km from the front line. The vehicle was clearly marked as IAEA. Nobody from the crew was wounded as the vehicle was armoured and took most of the hit.

=== 2025 ===
In early April 2025, ZNPP director Yuriy Chernichuk stated the plant would aim to be compliant with Russian Rostekhnadzor regulations and licensing by 2028. He suggested a restart, beginning with two units, under the prerequisites of an end to hostilities and a new supply of water for cooling, previously supplied by the Kakhovka Dam, destroyed in June 2023 while under Russian control. Ukraine rejected discussion of a restart as a violation of nuclear and radiation safety standards.

In late April 2025, both the United States and Ukraine submitted peace proposals to European officials in Paris, each with provisions for returning Ukrainian control of the plant, with US involvement. The US proposal called for the plant to also supply power to Russian-controlled territory. Later US proposals included provisions for joint control of the plant.

In late 2025, the plant was without external power for a month. Russia and Ukraine blamed each other for attacks on power lines.

On 28 December, a temporary, local ceasefire between Russian and Ukrainian forces at ZNPP was mediated by the IAEA. Repairs on power transmission lines between the ZNPP switchyards and the Zaporizhzhia thermal power station started and were expected to last several days.

=== 2026 ===
On 30 May 2026 Russian side accused Ukraine of deliberate drone attack on the building of reactor 6. IAEA inspectors present on site confirmed remains of an unidentified drone and damaged metal hatch. No radiation increase or any other damage was observed.

== See also ==
- Russian strikes against Ukrainian infrastructure (2022–present)
- Nuclear risk during the Russian invasion of Ukraine
