= Massimo Aparo =

Italian diplomat (born 1953)

Massimo Aparo Massimo Aparo
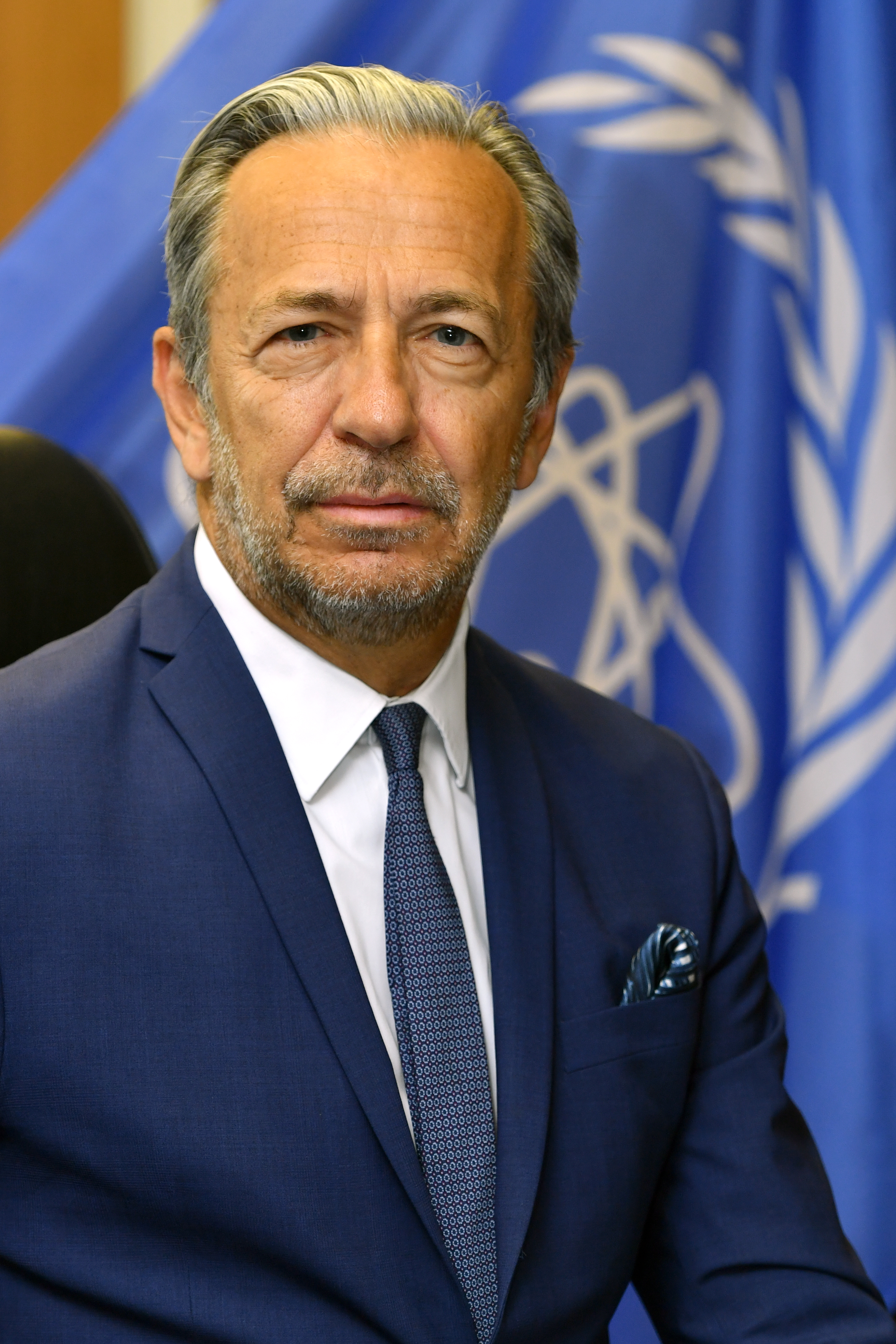
- Official portrait, 2018

Deputy Director General of International Atomic Energy Agency
- Incumbent
- Assumed office 11 May 2018
- Preceded by: Tero Varjoranta

Personal details
- Born: 31 July 1953 (age 73) Pistoia, Italy
- Education: A nuclear engineer, graduated from Sapienza University of Rome

Massimo Aparo (born 31 July 1953) is an Italian nuclear engineer, who started working as acting deputy director general and head of the Department of Safeguards, after Tero Varjoranta has resigned effective 11 May 2018.

== Biography ==
Massimo Aparo was born in Pistoia. He is a nuclear engineer and was graduated from Sapienza University of Rome.

Aparo, before joining the International Atomic Energy Agency (IAEA) worked as Director General of an Italian company in the area of radiation detection and monitoring, in the European Space Agency and at Italy’s former National Committee for Nuclear Energy.

== Career ==
He was appointed Acting Deputy Director General and Head of the Department of Safeguards in the IAEA on 11 May 2018 by the Yukiya Amano Director General of IAEA. Before this date, he occupied the position of Acting Director of the Office for Verification in Iran.

Aparo started working in the IAEA Safeguards Department since 1997. He served in the following positions:

- Section Head of the Division of Technical and Scientific Services,
- Head of the Tokyo Regional Office in the Division of Operations A, and
- Head of the Iran Task Force

Before joining the IAEA, Aparo worked as director general of an Italian firm specialized in radiation detection and monitoring. He also has the experience of working in the European Space Agency and at the Italian Nuclear Energy Commission.

== Iran Task Force ==
Aparo, is the leader of an elite unit of the International Atomic Energy Agency known as Iran Task Force. It was created three years ago by IAEA’s director-general, Japanese diplomat Yukiya Amano. The task force consists of around 50 members, including nuclear engineers, chemists, physicists, intelligence data analysts and communication experts.

According to the Jerusalem Post, “The Iran Task Force is part of the IAEA’s Department of Safeguards and Verification, which is in charge of making sure that all its state members properly use nuclear technology and know-how for the declared civilian and peaceful purposes: scientific research,”

== Zaporizhzhia Nuclear Power Plant ==
On 29 August 2022, an IAEA team flew out sent to investigate the Zaporizhzhia Nuclear Power Plant in Ukraine which was in the middle of conflict. The overall IAEA team was led by Rafael Grossi, Lydie Evrard and Aparo. No leaks had been reported at the plant before their arrival but shelling had occurred days before.

== See also ==
- Radiation and Nuclear Safety Authority
- IAEA safeguards
- International Commission on Radiological Protection
- International Atomic Energy Agency
- Yukiya Amano
- Tero Varjoranta
