= Lydie Evrard =

French engineer

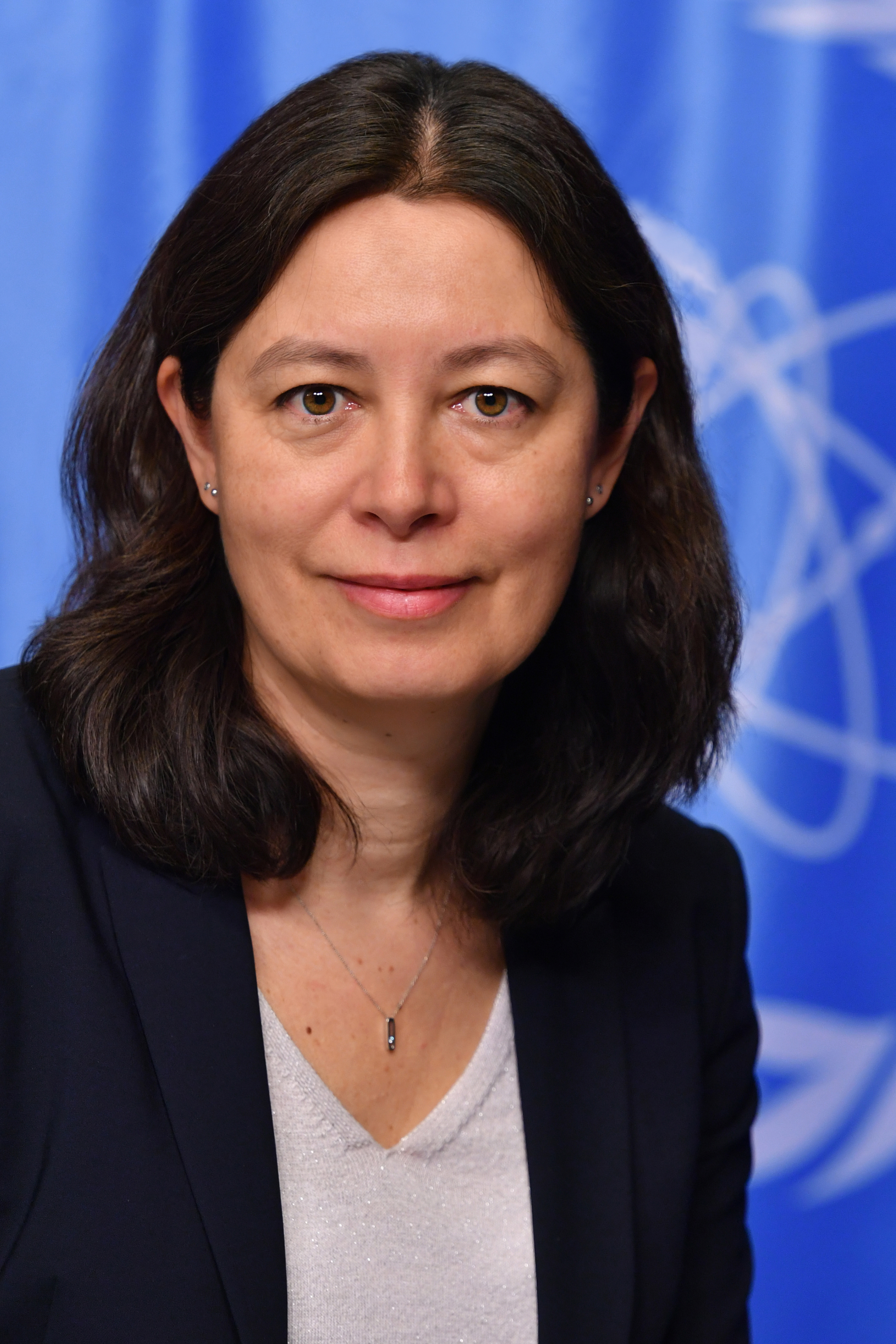
- Official portrait, 2021
- Born: Lydie Xuân Thuy Nguyen
- Occupation: Engineer
- Employer: International Atomic Energy Agency (IAEA)
- Known for: Head of the Department of. Nuclear Safety and Security at the IAEA

Lydie Evrard, born Lydie Xuân Thuy Nguyen, is a French engineer and Head of the Department of Nuclear Safety and Security at the IAEA since 2021. She is also the Deputy Director General of the International Atomic Energy Agency (IAEA).

== Life ==
Evrard's first degree is in engineering, she has earned master's degrees in Oil and Gas Operations and Public Administration.

Evrard became an engineer in 1995 when she started work at the French Ministry of Energy. Throughout her career she was involved in regulation.

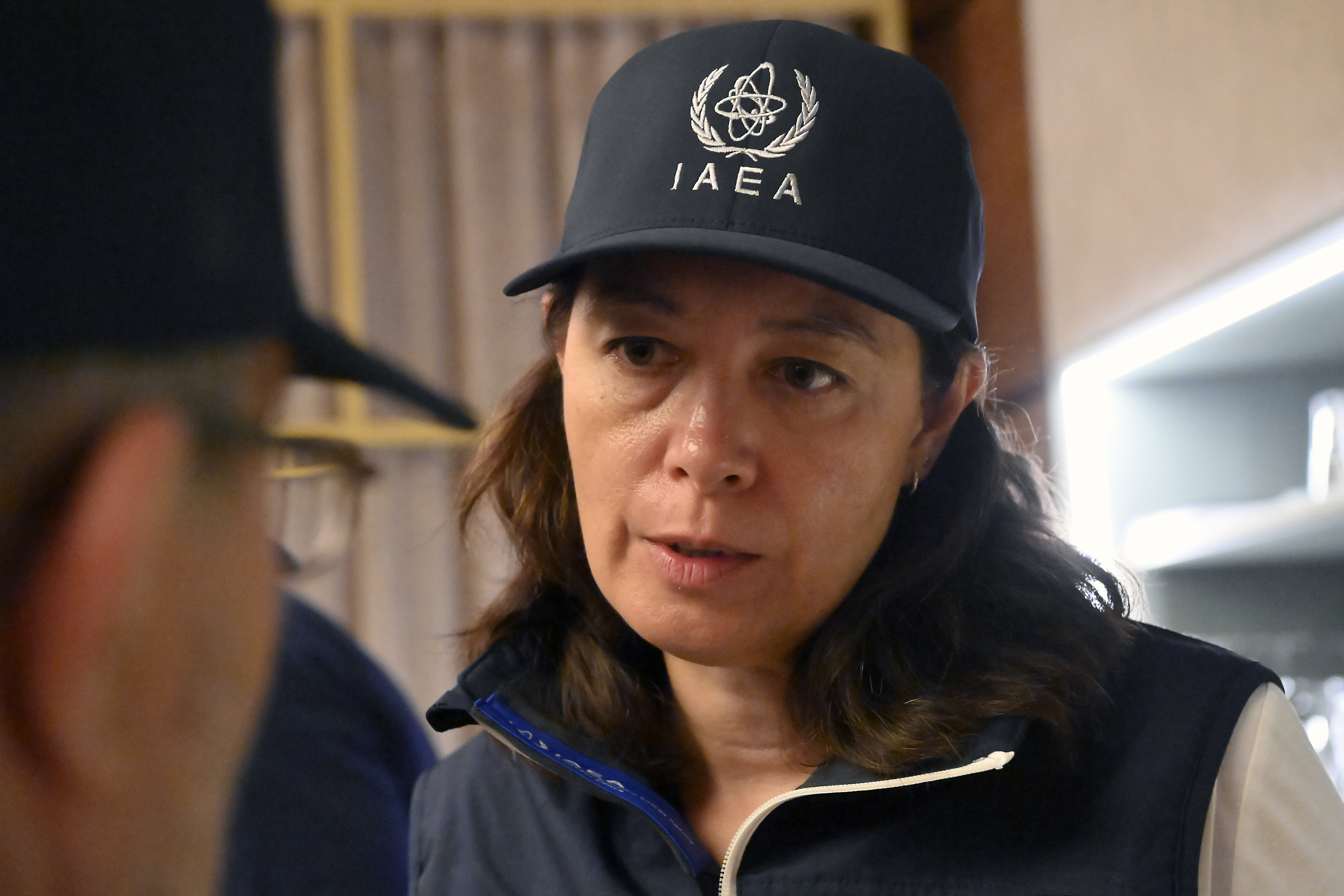
Lydie Evrard en route to the Zaporizhzhia Nuclear Power Plant in 2022

In April 2021 she became the Head of the Department of Nuclear Safety and Security at the IAEA. She was also the Deputy Director General of the IAEA. At the end of that year she was knighted when joining the French Legion of Honor. Her department of Nuclear Safety was created in 1996 as a response to the Chernobyl nuclear accident.

In September 2021 she was conducting inspections at the Fukushima Daiichi Nuclear Power Station following the nuclear accident there to ensure that corrective measures had been made. In February 2022, she assesses the plans of the Japanese government to release contaminated water in the sea. In October 2023, she confirmed the release of the waste water of the power station met safety standards.

In April 2022 she led an IAEA team delivering additional equipment to the Chornobyl Nuclear Power Plant.

On 29 August 2022 she was leading the safety team sent to investigate the Zaporizhzhya Nuclear Power Plant in Ukraine. The overall IAEA team was led by Rafael Grossi, IAEA's Director General, and the other Deputy Director Massimo Aparo from the IAEA' safeguards department was also on the leadership team. No leaks had been reported at the plant before their arrival but shelling had occurred days before.
