= Tero Varjoranta =

Finnish diplomat

Tero Varjoranta Tero Varjoranta
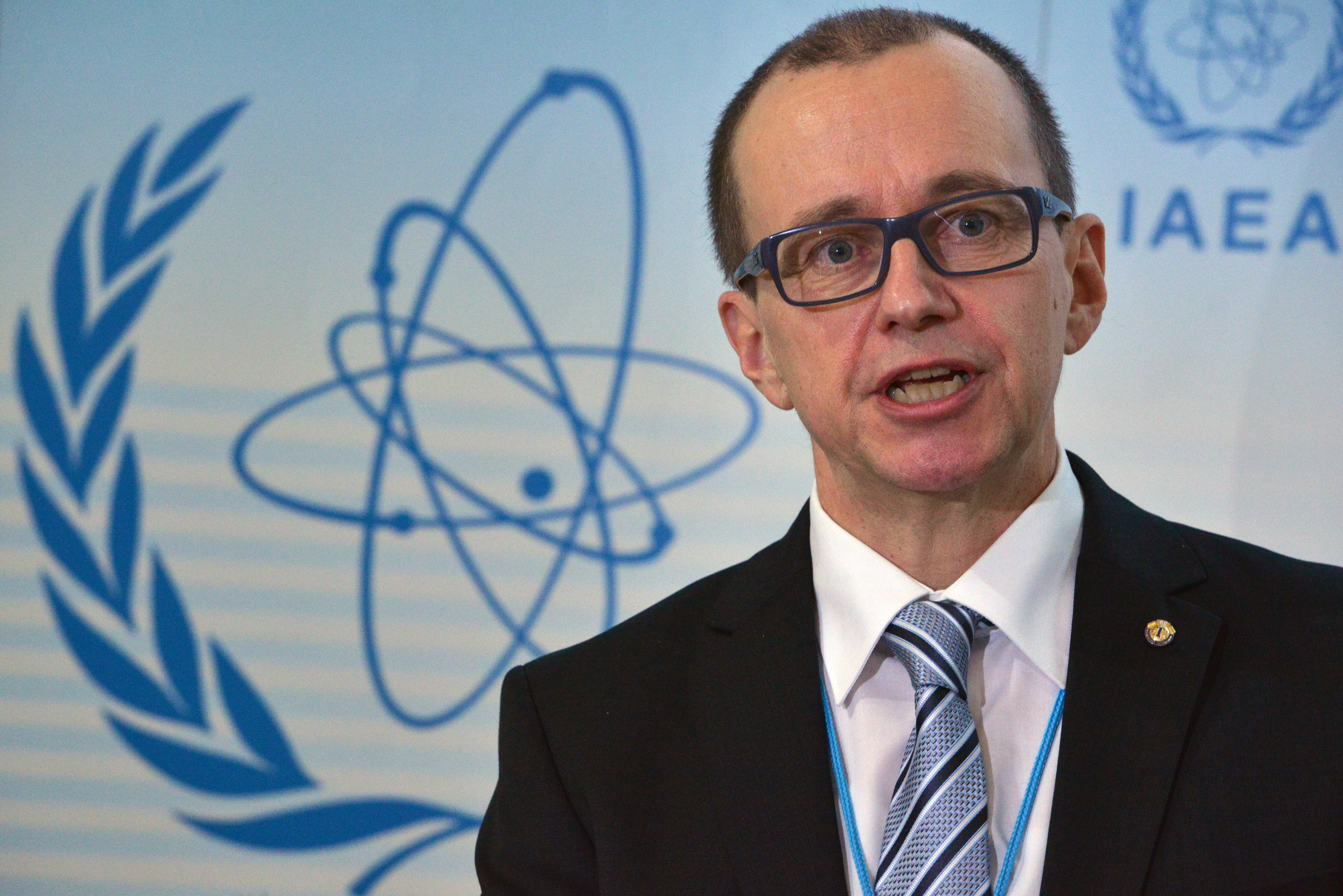

Deputy Director General of International Atomic Energy Agency
- In office 1 October 2013 – 11 May 2018
- Preceded by: Herman Nackaerts, Belgium

Personal details
- Born: 15 January 1957 (age 69) Finland
- Education: Helsinki University, BSc in Physics

Tero Varjoranta (born January 15, 1957) is a Finnish diplomat who started working as Deputy Director General of the IAEA and Head of the agency's Inspection and Supervision Department.

He suddenly resigned from his position on May 11, 2018.

== Biography ==
Tero Varjoranta was born on January 15, 1957, in Finland. He graduated in physics from Helsinki University.

== Career ==
Tero Varjoranta is a Finnish with 30 years of experience in nuclear energy. He has served as Director of Nuclear Recycle and Safety in Finland for many years.

Tero Varjoranta since 1 October 2013, served as Deputy Director General of IAEA, Head of the Department of Safeguards and Director of IAEA Inspectors who verify countries’ compliance with the prohibition of the proliferation of nuclear weapons.

He was the Director General of the Radiation and Nuclear Safety Authority, STUK, in Finland. Between 2010 and 2012, Varjoranta served as a Director in the IAEA Department of Nuclear Energy, having previously worked as Division Manager in the International Science and Technology Centre in Moscow. Tero has served as President of ESARDA, President of the European Nuclear Security Regulators Group (ENSREG) and as a member of SAGSI for seven years.

As Director of IAEA inspectors, Tero Varjoranta traveled to Iran in recent years on several occasions. Two months after the JCPOA was signed, he accompanied Yukiya Amano Director General of IAEA during his visit to Parchin Area in Tehran in September 2015. During the visit, the inspectors took samples from Parchin Area to announce the results later on.

== Resignation ==
The IAEA spokesman said: “Mr. Tero Varjoranta resigned as of May 11.” The IAEA Director General has not commented on Mr. Tero Varjoranta's resignation and considered it confidential, said the spokesman.

Reuters News Agency wrote: “The departure of Tero Varjoranta comes at a sensitive time, three days after the United States announced it was quitting world powers’ nuclear accord with Iran.”

== Replacement ==
Following the resignation of Tero Varjoranta on May 11, 2018, the IAEA Director General assigned Massimo Aparo temporary director and supervisor of the department for monitoring Iran as his successor. Aparo has served as head of Iran team in the above department since 2016.

The IAEA spokesman said the IAEA Director General Yukiya Amano intends to assign a permanent successor for this position.

== See also ==
- Radiation and Nuclear Safety Authority
- Nuclear power in Finland
- International Commission on Radiological Protection
- International Atomic Energy Agency
