= Yukiya Amano =

Japanese diplomat (1947–2019)

- 天野 之弥
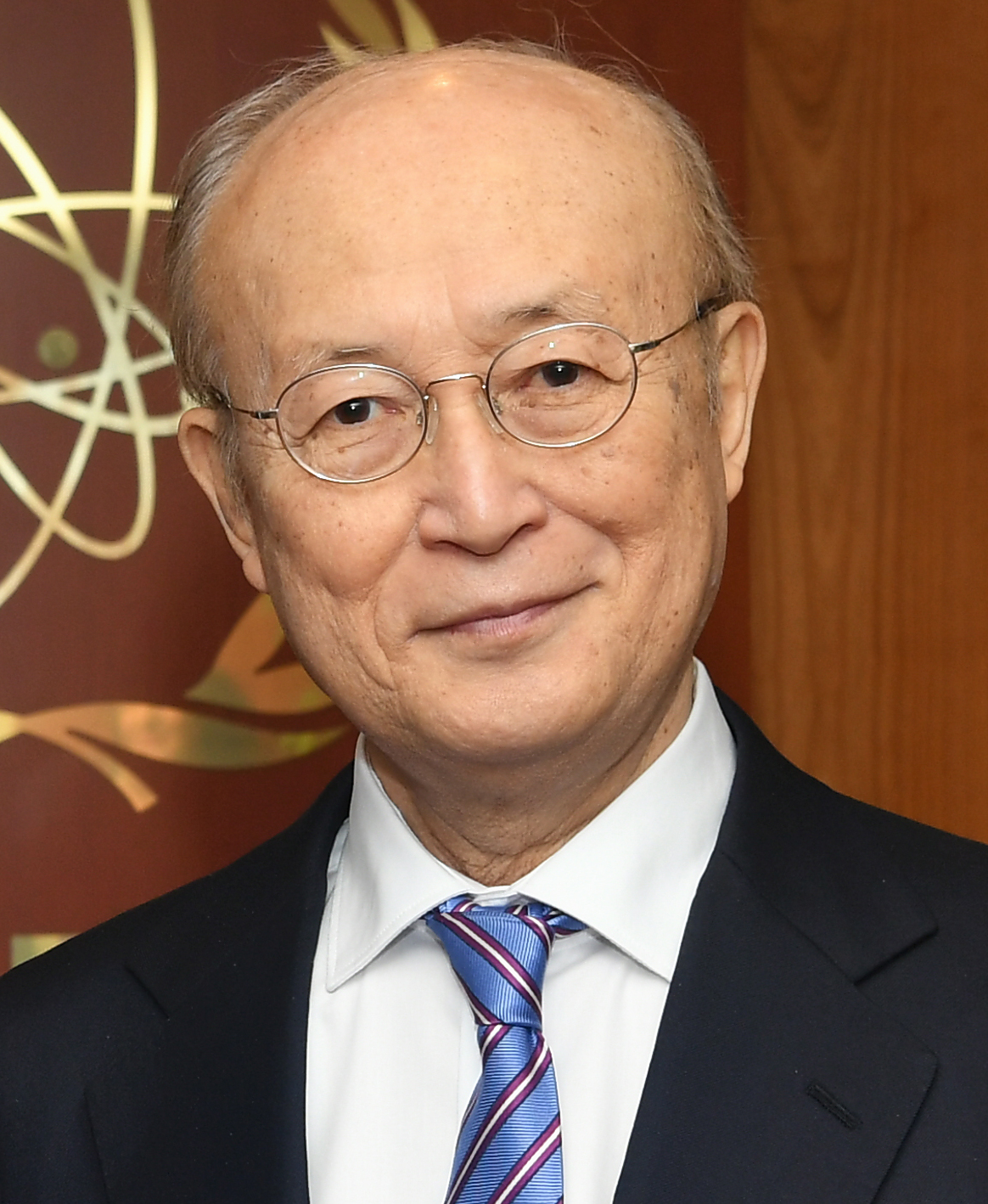
- Amano in 2019

5th Director General of the International Atomic Energy Agency
- In office 1 December 2009 – 18 July 2019
- Preceded by: Mohamed ElBaradei
- Succeeded by: Rafael Grossi

Personal details
- Born: 9 May 1947 Yugawara, Allied-occupied Japan
- Died: 18 July 2019 (aged 72) Vienna, Austria
- Cause of death: Cancer
- Spouse: Yukika Amano
- Education: University of Tokyo; University of Franche-Comté; University of Nice Sophia Antipolis

Yukiya Amano (Japanese: 天野 之弥, Hepburn: Amano Yukiya; 9 May 1947 – 18 July 2019) was a Japanese diplomat, who served as the Director-general of the International Atomic Energy Agency (IAEA) from 1 December 2009 until his death on 18 July 2019. Previously, Amano served as an international civil servant for the United Nations and its subdivisions.

== Early life ==
Amano was born on 9 May 1947 in Yugawara, a town in Kanagawa near the Tokyo metropolitan area. He started his studies at the University of Tokyo in 1968. After graduating from the Faculty of Law, he joined the Ministry of Foreign Affairs in April 1972. He specialized in the international disarmament issue and nuclear nonproliferation efforts. In France, from 1973 to 1975, Amano studied at the University of Franche-Comté, and as well as at the University of Nice.

== Career ==
=== Japanese Ministry of Foreign Affairs ===
Amano held different posts in the foreign ministry such as the Director of the Science Division and Director of the Nuclear Energy Division in 1993. As a member of the Diplomatic service, he was posted in the Embassies of Japan in Vientiane, Washington, D.C., and Brussels, in the Delegation of Japan to the Conference on Disarmament in Geneva and was Consul General of Japan in Marseille, France.

In August 2002, he was appointed Director-General for Arms Control and Scientific Affairs, and in August 2004, he was appointed Director-General of the Disarmament, Nonproliferation, and Science Department. In these positions, he was involved in international negotiations such as the Nuclear Non-Proliferation Treaty extension; the Comprehensive Nuclear-Test-Ban Treaty; the Biological Weapons Convention verification protocol; amendment of the Convention on Certain Conventional Weapons and the International Code of Conduct against Ballistic Missile Proliferation. He represented Japan as a governmental expert on the UN Panel on Missiles in April 2001 and in the UN Expert Group on Disarmament and Nonproliferation Education in July 2001.

=== International Atomic Energy Agency ===
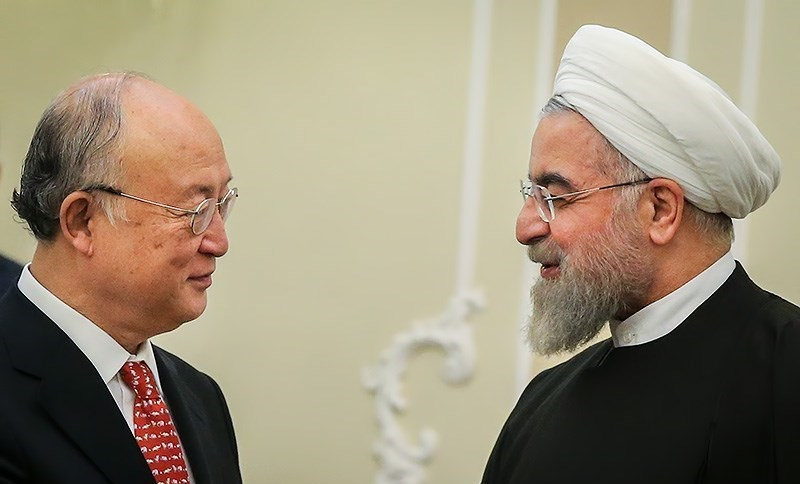
Amano meeting with Iranian President Hassan Rouhani in Sa'dabad Complex

In 2005, Amano served as the ambassador from Japan to the IAEA. From September 2005 to September 2006, Amano served as the Chairman of the IAEA Board of Governors. The IAEA and its Director General Mohamed ElBaradei jointly received the 2005 Nobel Peace Prize. Amano represented the IAEA at the Nobel Prize award ceremony.

In September 2008, Japanese government announced that it had nominated Yukiya Amano to be the next Director General of the IAEA. On 2 July 2009, he was elected by the Board of Governors as Director General for the IAEA in the sixth round of voting. He defeated South African representative Abdul Samad Minty, his primary rival. On 3 July 2009 all 145 IAEA member states formally appointed Yukiya Amano "by acclamation".

On 1 December 2009, Amano began his first term as Director General of the International Atomic Energy Agency.

In November 2010, British newspaper The Guardian reported on a leaked U.S. diplomatic cable originating a year earlier in Vienna, detailing a meeting between Amano and an American ambassador. The author of the cable summarized a statement by Amano in which the latter offered that he "was solidly in the U.S. court on every key strategic decision from high-level personnel appointments to the handling of Iran's alleged nuclear weapons program." In March 2012, Amano was accused by several former senior IAEA officials of pro-western bias, over-reliance on unverified intelligence, and of sidelining sceptics.

==== Views on nuclear proliferation ====
In an interview mid-2009 with the Austrian newspaper Die Presse, Yukiya Amano said he was "resolute in opposing the spread of nuclear arms because I am from a country that experienced Hiroshima and Nagasaki".

==== Views on nuclear power ====
Yukiya Amano said at the Center for Energy Sustainability and Economics' Nuclear Power Forum, "it is vital that concerns regarding safety and security are addressed. Safety and security are primarily the responsibility of each sovereign state. However, the IAEA has a strong role to play because an accident or malicious act may have far-reaching and cross-border consequences."

According to Amano, "(t)here has been a very significant improvement in the efficient and safe performance of the nuclear industry in the past two decades. This reflects factors including improved design, better operating procedures, a strengthened and more effective regulatory environment, and the emergence of a strong safety culture. The IAEA promotes an integrated approach to nuclear safety, focusing on management systems, effective leadership, and safety culture. It is important that countries' safety and security infrastructures keep pace with developments in all areas of nuclear science and technology. We must never be complacent."

==== Official visit to the Philippines ====
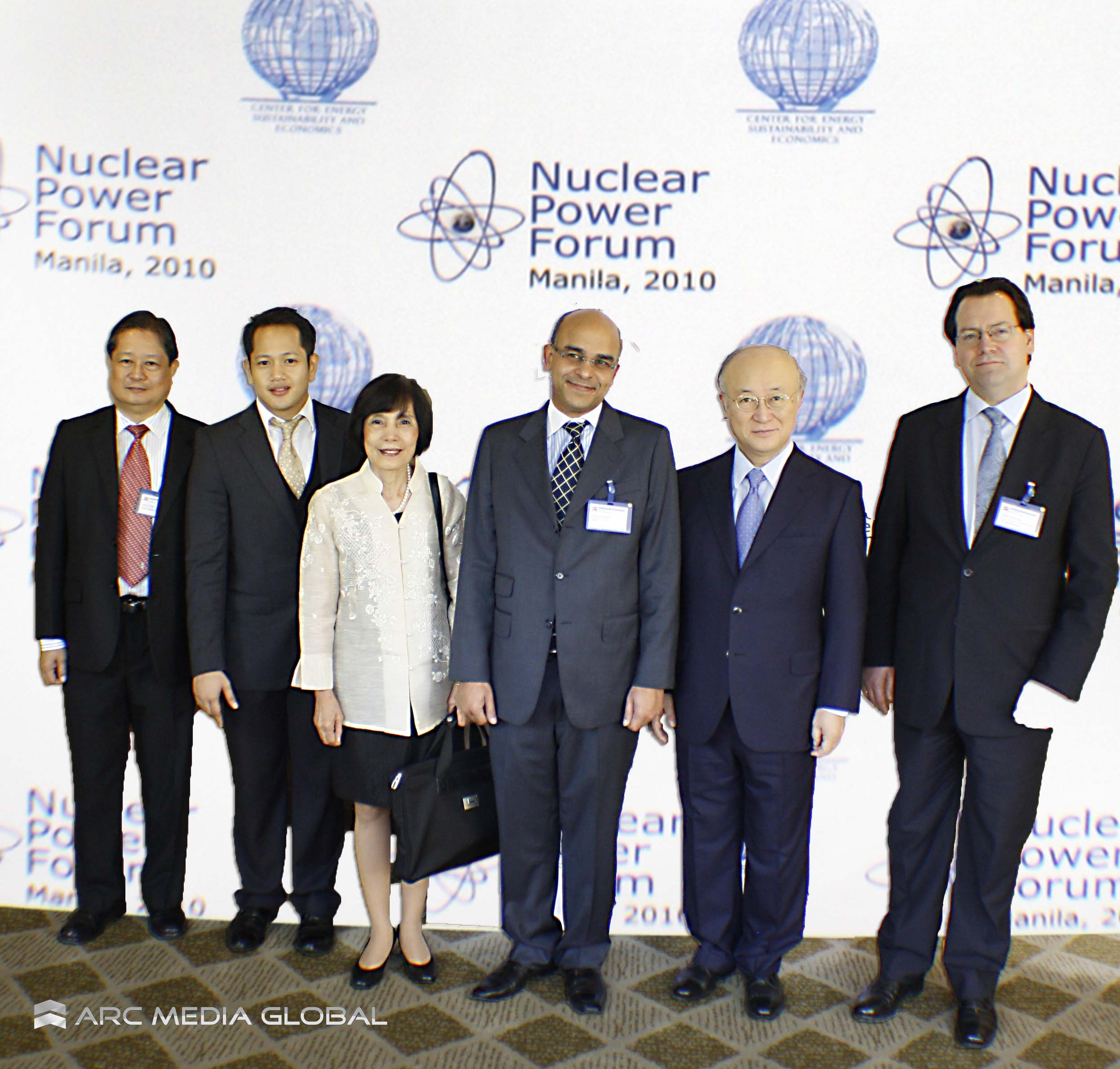

On 10 December 2010, at the opening session of the Nuclear Power Forum organised by Center for Energy Sustainability and Economics and Arc Media Global, Amano said that the IAEA has "provided assistance in strengthening the country´s capabilities in nuclear science and technology and energy planning" as well as "advice on developing a Human Resource Development Plan for Nuclear Energy." At the Forum, Amano said the Philippines "plays an important role at the global level, for example by chairing the Review Conference of the Treaty on the Non-Proliferation of Nuclear Weapons."

The Philippines assumed presidency of the Nuclear Non-Proliferation Treaty Review Conference in May 2010, which discussed peaceful use of nuclear energy, non-proliferation, and disarmament of nations developing nuclear weapons. Amano also visited the Bataan Nuclear Power Plant on 11 December 2010, during the Forum's second day. According to the Philippine Department of Foreign Affairs, the IAEA can assess the possible rehabilitation of the plant. During Amano's official visit, he held meetings with Foreign Affairs Secretary Alberto Romulo, Science and Technology Secretary Mario Montejo and Energy Secretary Jose Rene Almendras. The Philippine government is also looking at expanding its cooperation with the IAEA in training health professionals in the use of cancer radiotherapy.

==== Involvement in Japanese nuclear emergency after earthquake and tsunami ====
Following the Fukushima Daiichi nuclear accidents caused by earthquake and tsunami on 11 March 2011, Amano held a meeting with then-Japanese Prime Minister Naoto Kan in Tokyo on 18 March. Amano, who had just arrived from the agency's headquarters...said he would dispatch a team 'within days' to monitor radiation near the damaged plant." At the meeting, Amano said in his statement that he agreed on the necessity to disclose as much information as possible on the unfolding nuclear crisis in Fukushima. 'What's important is coordination with international society and better transparency,' Mr. Amano told reporters before the meeting."

== Personal life ==
Amano was married to Yukika Amano. He spoke French and English in addition to his native Japanese. The couple have no children.

== Death ==
Amano died of "unspecified illness" in Tokyo, Japan, on 18 July 2019, at the age of 72.

IAEA said its flag over its headquarters in Vienna has been lowered to half-mast. IAEA has said in a statement when he died: "The Secretariat of the International Atomic Energy Agency regrets to inform with deepest sadness of the passing of Director-General Yukiya Amano. Director-General is in contact with members of the board of governors regarding his future plans. He will make a formal communication to the board at an appropriate time. We cannot but imagine Director-General Amano's sorrow in his passing amid his third term. We extend our condolences to his bereaved families over his death."

== Awards and honors ==
- Japan: Grand Cordon of Order of the Rising Sun (2019, posthumous)
- Kazakhstan: Medal "25 Years of Independence of the Republic of Kazakhstan" (2017)
- Portugal: Grand Cross of the Order of Merit (2018)

=== Other honors ===
On 5 June 2020, IAEA opened the Yukiya Amano Laboratories in honor of him. Located at the outskirts of Vienna, the building houses three of the five laboratories run jointly by the IAEA and the UN's Food and Agriculture Organization (FAO).

== Publications ==
- "A Japanese View on Nuclear Disarmament", The Non-Proliferation Review, 2002
- "The Significance of the NPT Extension", Future Restraints on Arms Proliferation, 1996
- "La Non-Prolifération Nucléaire en Extrême-Orient", Proliferation et Non-Proliferation Nucleaire, 1995
- "Sea Dumping of Liquid Radioactive Waste by Russia", Gaiko Jiho, 1994

== See also ==
- Nuclear Security Summit (2010) (attended)

Diplomatic posts
| Preceded by Mohamed ElBaradei | Director General of the International Atomic Energy Agency; 2009–2019 | Succeeded by Rafael Grossi |
