= Rafael Grossi =

Argentine diplomat (born 1961)

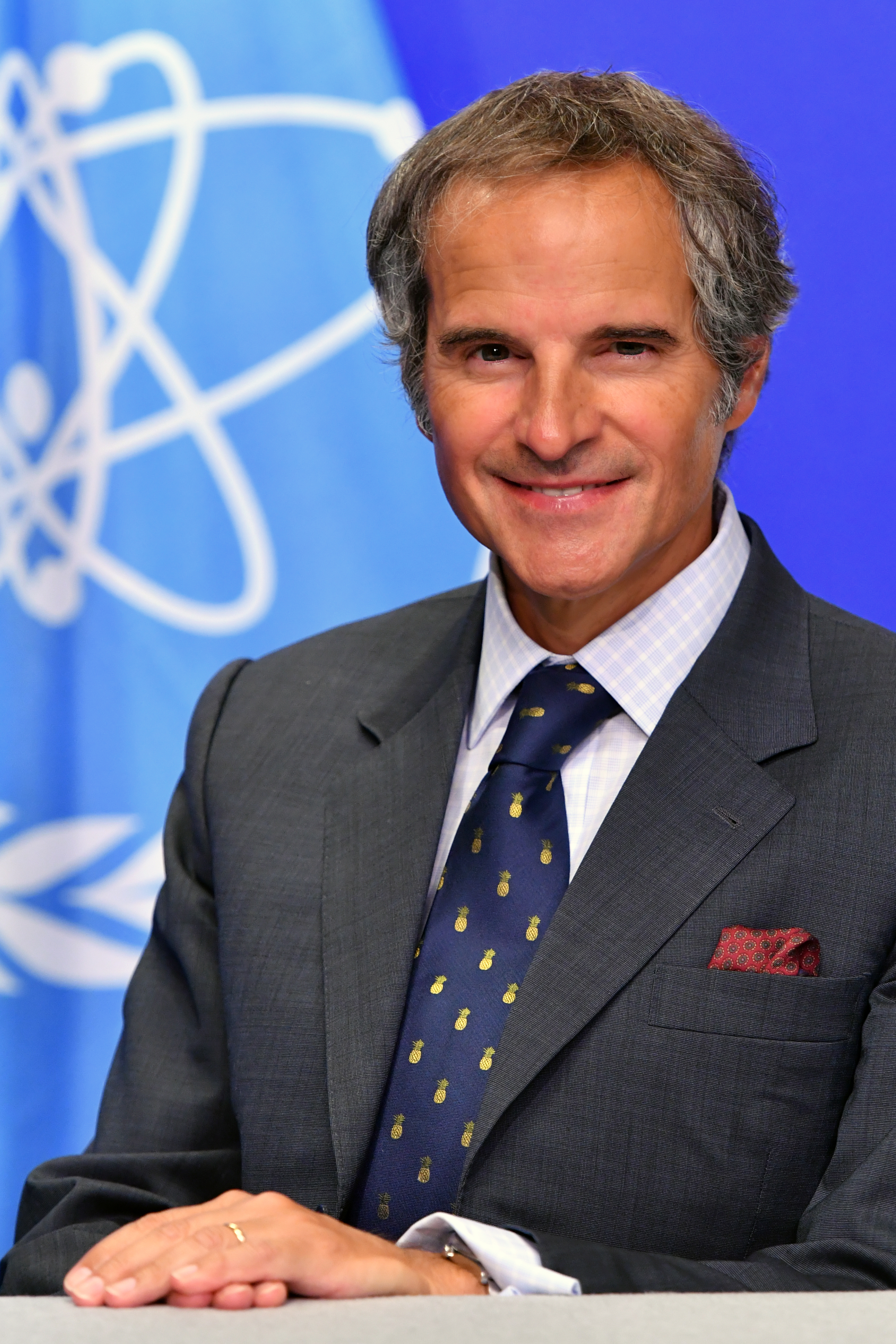
- Official portrait, 2020

6th Director General of the International Atomic Energy Agency
- Incumbent
- Assumed office 3 December 2019
- Preceded by: Yukiya Amano

Argentine Ambassador to Austria
- In office 10 June 2013 – 29 November 2019
- President: Cristina Fernández de Kirchner; Mauricio Macri
- Preceded by: Eugenio María Curia
- Succeeded by: Gustavo Eduardo Ainchil

Deputy Director General of the International Atomic Energy Agency
- In office January 2010 – 9 June 2013
- President: Yukiya Amano

Personal details
- Born: Rafael Mariano Grossi; 29 January 1961 (age 65) Buenos Aires, Argentina
- Citizenship: Argentina; Italy
- Children: 8
- Education: Pontifical Catholic University of Argentina (BA); Graduate Institute of International Studies (MA, PhD)

Rafael Mariano Grossi (born 29 January 1961) is an Argentine diplomat. He has been Director General of the International Atomic Energy Agency (IAEA) since 3 December 2019. He was formerly the Argentine ambassador to Austria.

== Early life and studies ==
Rafael Grossi was born in Buenos Aires in 1961 to Italian immigrants.

In 1983, he graduated from the Pontifical Catholic University of Argentina with a B.A. in political science, and in 1985 he joined the Argentine foreign service. In 1997, he graduated from the University of Geneva and the Graduate Institute of International Studies with an M.A. and Ph.D. in history, international relations, and international politics.

== Career ==
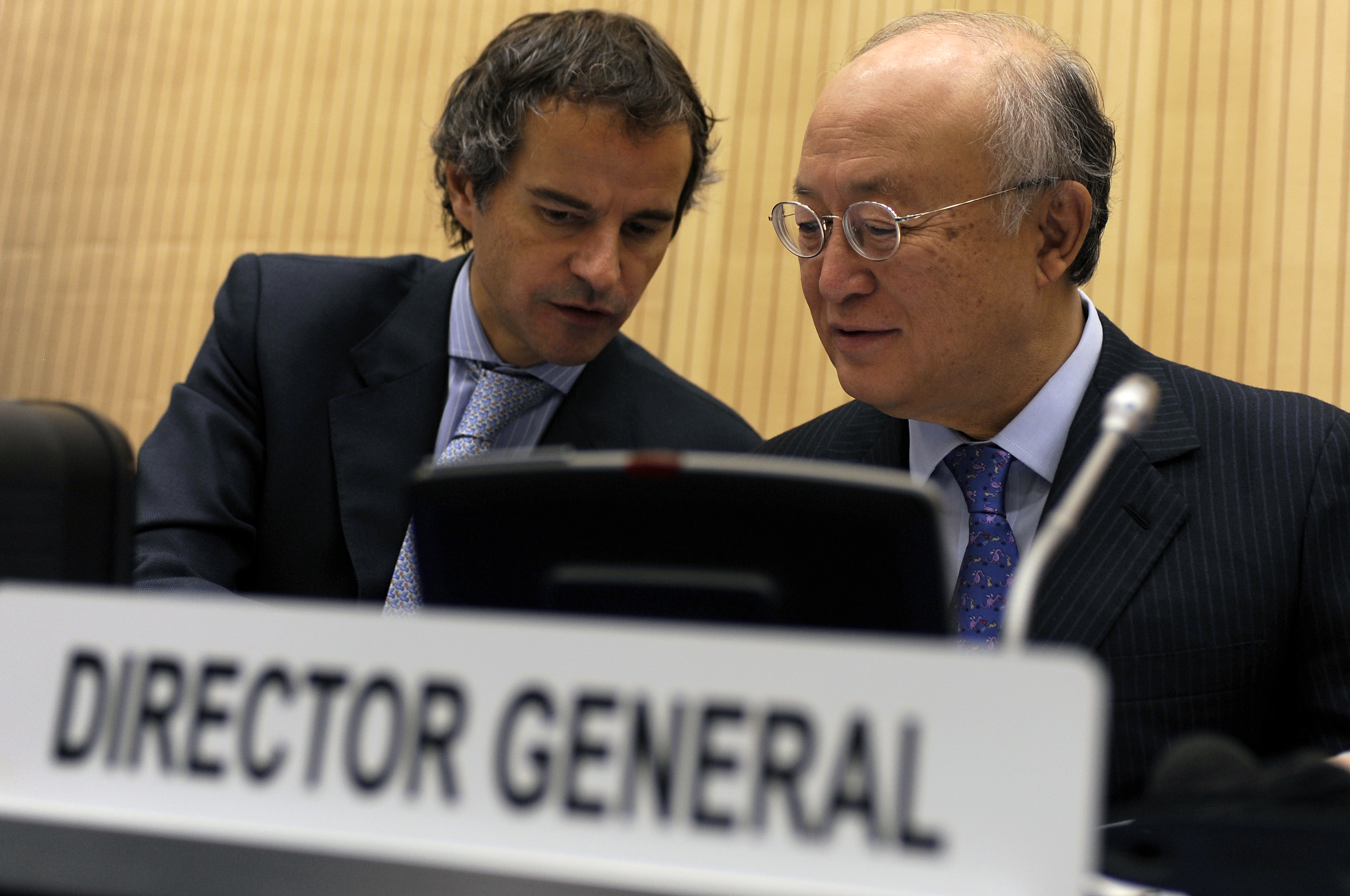
Grossi alongside Yukiya Amano in 2011.

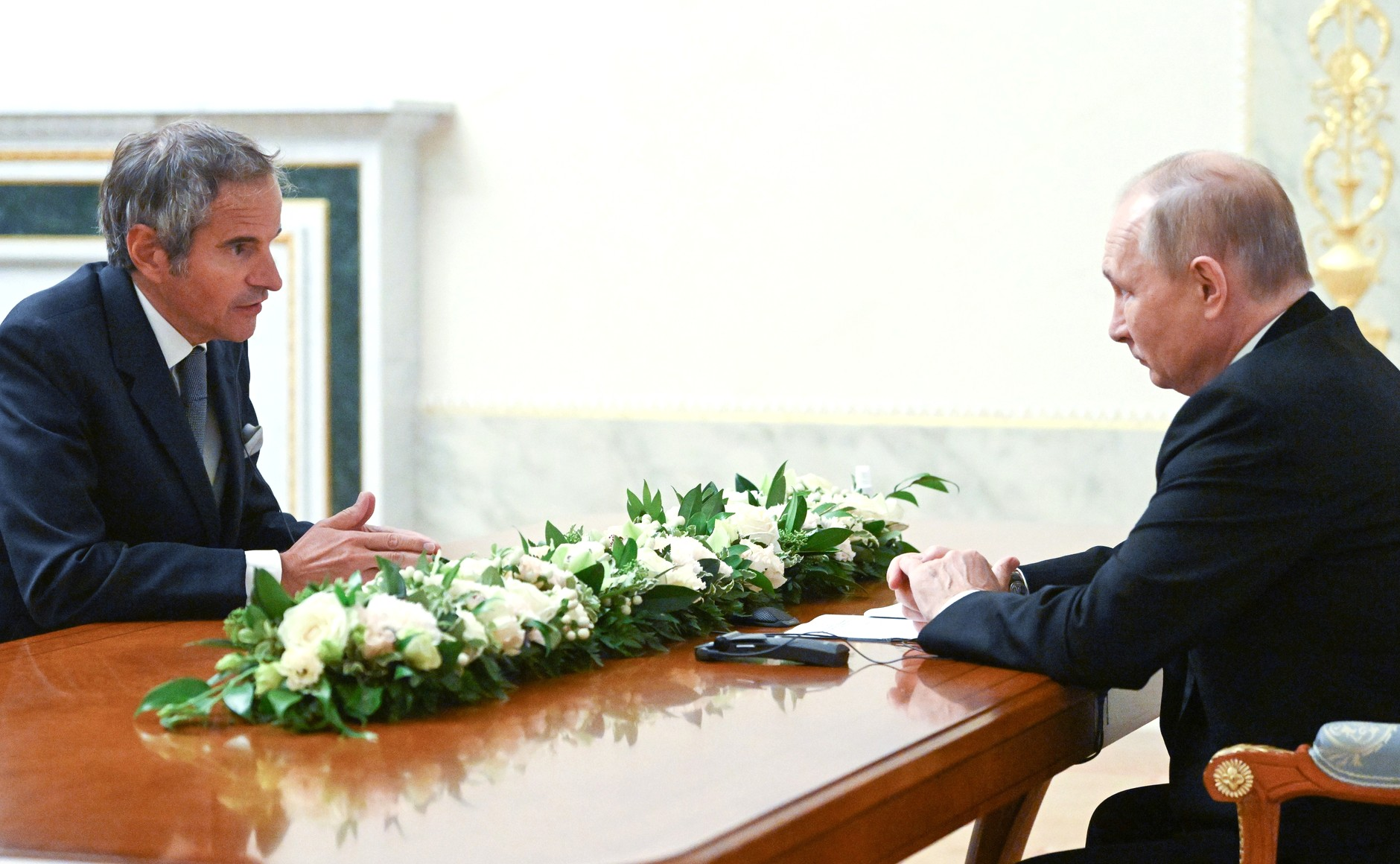
Grossi with Russian President Vladimir Putin on 11 October 2022.

Grossi began working in nuclear policy during a collaboration between the Argentine foreign service and INVAP. Between 1997 and 2000, he was the president of the United Nations Group of Government Experts on the International Weapons Registry, and later became adviser to the Under-Secretary-General of the United Nations on disarmament.

From 2002 to 2007, he was chief of staff to Director General Mohamed ElBaradei the International Atomic Energy Agency and the Organisation for the Prohibition of Chemical Weapons. While working for the United Nations, Grossi visited North Korea's nuclear facilities and participated in several meetings with representatives of Iran to reach an agreement to freeze its nuclear program.

During his work for the Argentine foreign service, Grossi was the General Director of Political Coordination of the Ministry of Foreign Affairs and Worship, ambassador to Belgium and Argentina's permanent representative to the United Nations Office at Geneva. Between 2010 and 2013, he served as Deputy Director General of the International Atomic Energy Agency, and that last year, President Cristina Fernández de Kirchner assigned him as ambassador to Austria and International Organisations based in Vienna, concurrent also in Slovakia and Slovenia.

In September 2015, the Argentine government announced the nomination of Grossi as a candidate for Director General of the IAEA, with support from other countries in Latin America and the Caribbean. In 2016, however, the government of Mauricio Macri withdrew its support to promote Susana Malcorra's candidacy as UN Secretary-General. In 2016, he was the President of the Nuclear Suppliers Group.

In 2017, President Macri announced that he would nominate Grossi for the presidency of the Review Conference of the Treaty on the Non-Proliferation of Nuclear Weapons to be held in 2020.

=== Contribution to the search of ARA San Juan ===
In November 2017, after the disappearance of ARA San Juan, Grossi had the idea of reviewing the records of the hydro-acoustic stations of the Comprehensive Nuclear-Test-Ban Treaty Organization (CTBTO) as an alternative to obtain clues about what happened with the submarine. He contacted Lassina Zerbo, the Executive Secretary of the CTBTO, and convinced him of doing such reviews. His efforts paid off: the agency subsequently reported on "an underwater impulse event" occurred near the last known position of the submarine by the listening posts on Ascension Island and Crozet Islands at 46.12°S 59.69°W. The remains of the ill-fated ship were found a year later, about twenty kilometers from the estimated position based on the cited records.

=== Director General of IAEA ===
On 2 August 2019, Grossi was presented as the Argentine candidate to become the Director General of IAEA. On 28 October 2019, the IAEA Board of Governors held its first vote to elect the new director general, but none of the candidates secured the two-thirds majority in the 35-member IAEA Board of Governors needed to be elected. The next day, 29 October, the second voting round was held, and Grossi won 24 votes, one more than the 23 required, and became the first Latin American to head the organisation. He assumed office on 3 December 2019. In August 2022, Grossi led a team of IAEA inspectors to the Zaporizhzhia Nuclear Power Plant in Russian-occupied southern Ukraine. Since 2022, Grossi had been in the spotlight to obtain information on nuclear materials from Iran to re-negotiate the JCPOA. In September 2022, he continued to express concerns about traces of uranium found at three Iranian nuclear sites. Grossi told a press conference in Vienna that he is "under political pressure". Iran has long denied that it seeks nuclear weapons for defense purposes.

Following the outcome of the Twelve-Day War, Iran's leadership spoke against him, some were even quoted saying he should be “arrested and executed”, and Ali Larijani, senior aide to Iranian Supreme Leader Ayatollah Ali Khamenei and the head of Iran’s Supreme National Security Council posted on X (Twitter), “When the war ends, we are going to deal with Grossi”. On the other hand, he received support from Argentina and European Union foreign policy chief Kaja Kallas, who posted on "X" (Twitter): “Full support to the IAEA and DG Grossi in his task to continue to monitor impartially Iran’s nuclear program. This will be key for a diplomatic settlement of the issue.” According to the Wall Street Journal, Grossi was receiving round-the-clock protection, provided by Austria’s EKO Cobra special services unit, after the country’s intelligence agency received information of a specific Iranian threat targeting him.

In 2025 he was awarded the title of Doctor honoris causa by EPFL.

In March 2026, Grossi reported that while Iran maintained a significant stockpile of near-weapons-grade uranium, there was no evidence of a structured program to build a nuclear bomb. On 17 March 2026, Grossi confirmed that a projectile struck the premises of the Bushehr Nuclear Power Plant in Iran. The incident occurred during ongoing U.S.–Israeli military strikes against Iranian infrastructure. While the IAEA reported no damage to the reactor or injuries to personnel, Grossi reiterated calls for maximum restraint to prevent a nuclear accident.

Amid the Iran-Israel conflict, Rafael Grossi stated in an interview that war could not entirely dismantle Iran's nuclear program, even if the country's primary facilities were severely damaged.

=== Candidacy for United Nations Secretary-General ===
In 2025, Grossi publicly confirmed his interest in being a candidate in the 2026 United Nations Secretary-General selection after being nominated by Argentina.

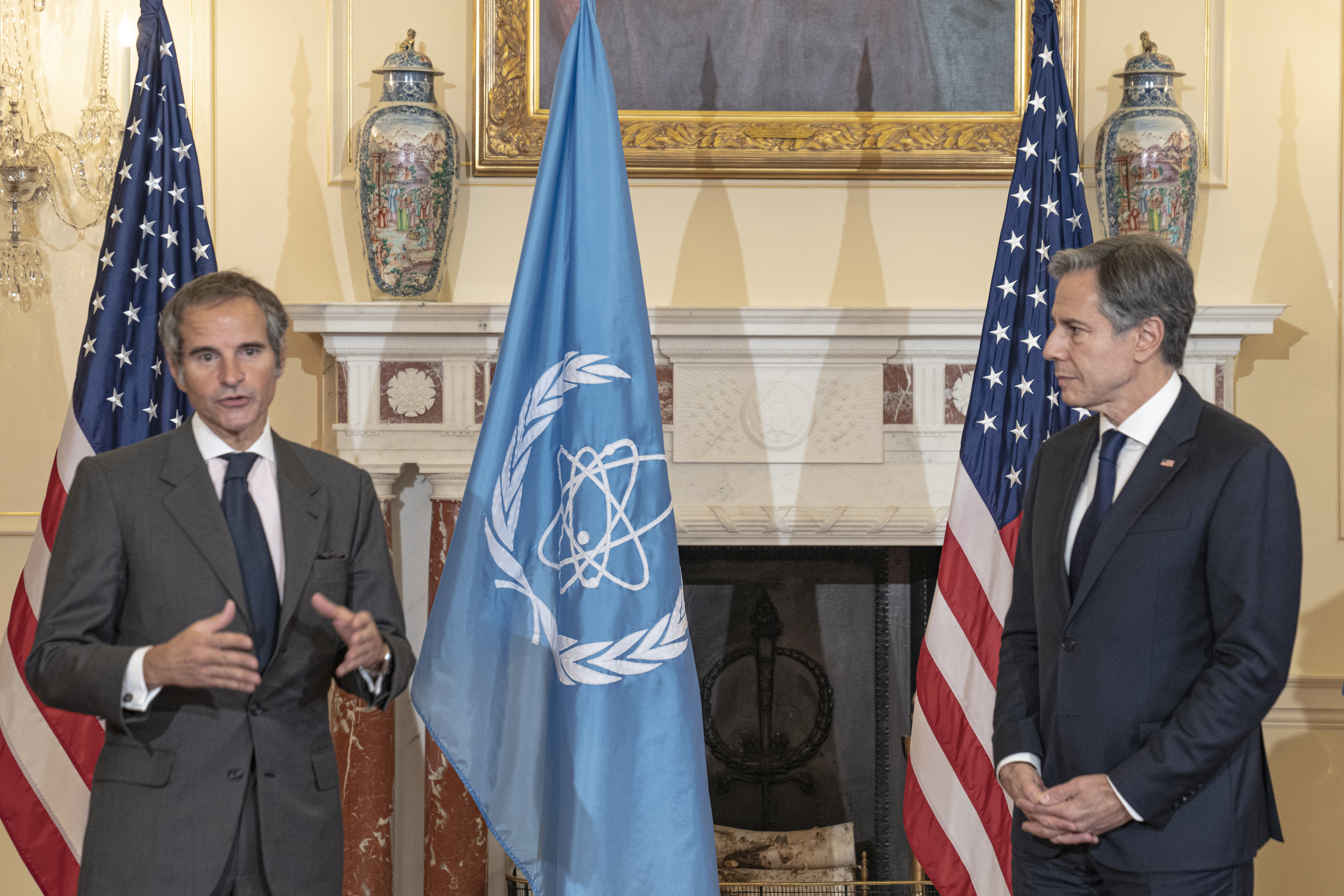
Grossi with U.S. Secretary of State Antony Blinken in October 2021

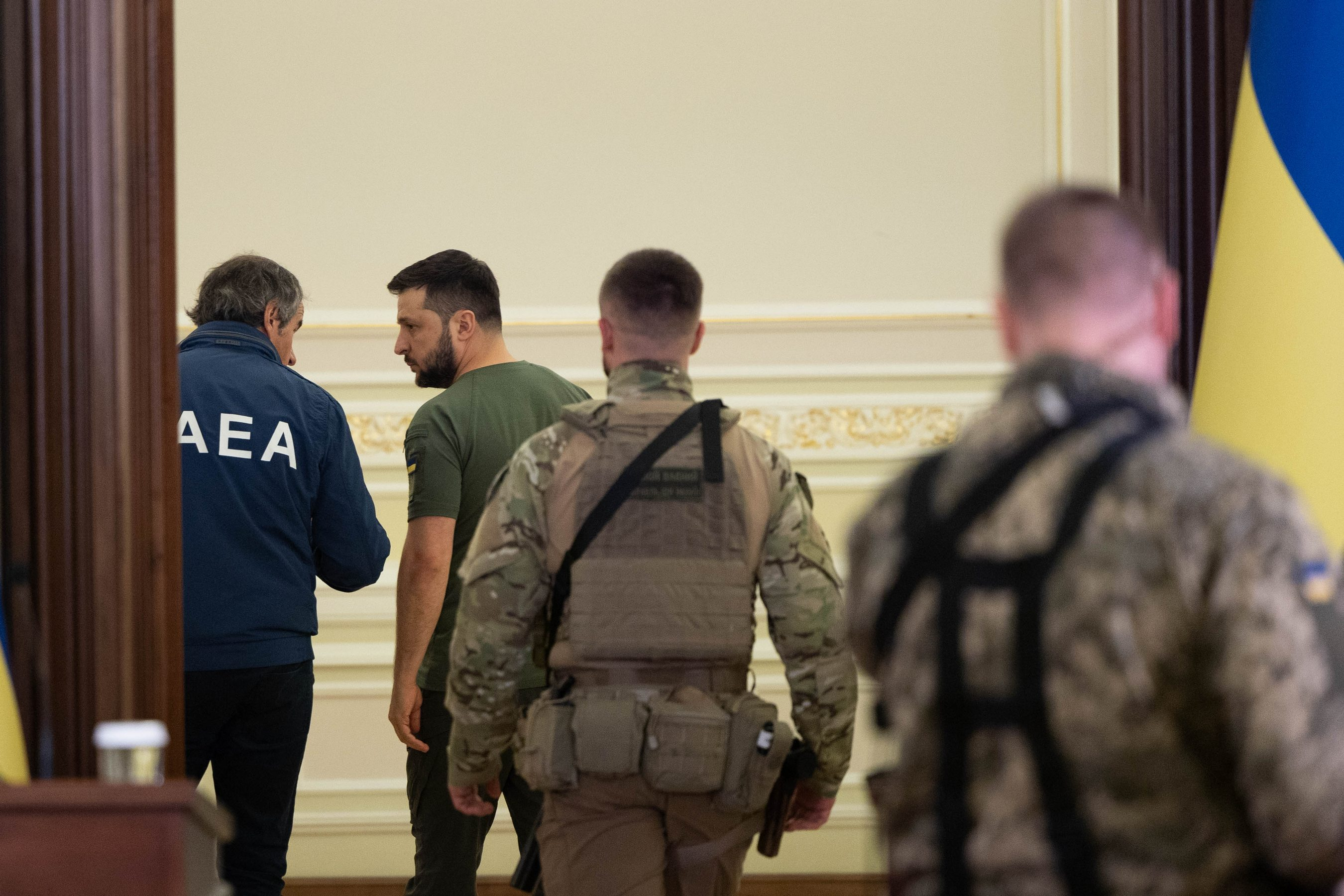
Grossi with Ukrainian President Volodymyr Zelenskyy on 26 April 2022

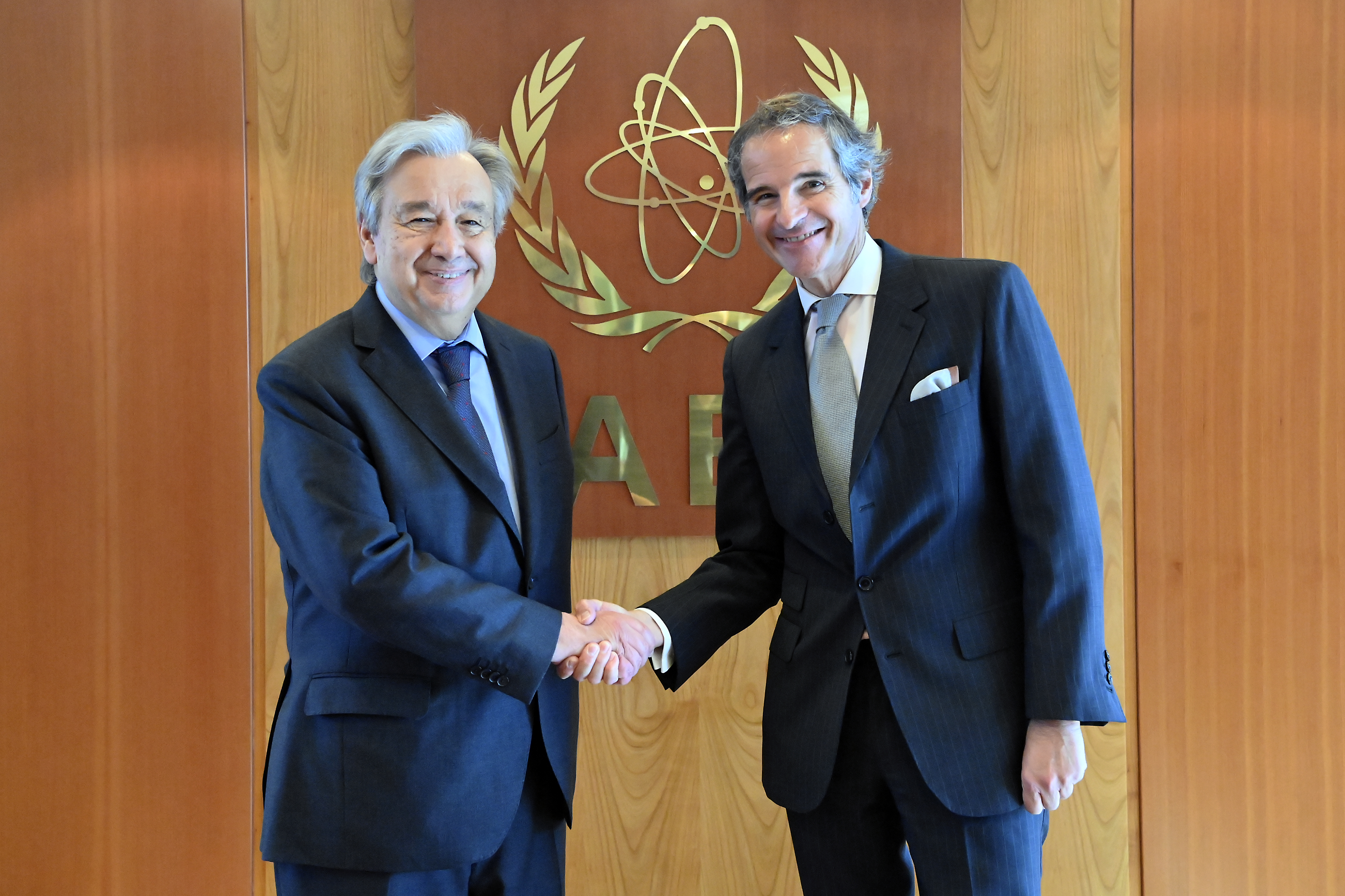
Grossi with UN Secretary-General António Guterres in May 2022

== Personal life ==
Rafael Grossi has eight children.

== Publications ==
- Penúltima alianza: el proceso de expansión de la OTAN y el nuevo mapa de la seguridad internacional. Buenos Aires: Grupo Editor Latinoamericano (1999).
- Kosovo, los límites del intervencionismo humanitario. Buenos Aires: Editorial Nuevohacer (2000).

Diplomatic posts
Preceded by Yukiya Amano	Director General of the International Atomic Energy Agency; 2020–present	Incumbent
