= Musa Bin Jaafar Bin Hassan =

United Nations official

Musa Bin Jaafar Bin Hassan was a career diplomat and academic from the Sultanate of Oman., and one of the longest-serving diplomats to UNESCO as ambassador, Permanent Delegate of Oman from 1984 to 2009. He was promoted to Adviser with Special Grade at the Permanent Delegation in 2009 and continued in this capacity until 2016. From 2016 until his retirement in 2018 he served at the Embassy of Oman in Paris. He was decorated with 1 UNESCO Gold Medal, 3 UNESCO Silver Medals as well as the honorary title of "Ambassador for Peace". Dr. Musa Bin Jaafar Bin Hassan died in Paris, France on 26 September 2020.

== Early life and education ==
Hassan was born in 1950 to a merchant family in the commercial centre of Oman, Mutrah. As a young man, he studied geography at Beirut University in Lebanon, before returning to Oman in 1976.

He was appointed the Director of the Department of Cultural Relations at the Ministry of Education. In the same year, he was named for the second time as President of the Al-Alhy Club and in 1983 was elected as the first Secretary-General of the University Club in Muscat, which later became known as the 'Cultural Club'.

== Diplomatic work ==
In 1982, Hassan's position at the Ministry of Education was extended to Director General of Missions and External Relations. In this capacity, he attended the conferences of UNESCO, the Office of International Education, and The Arab Organisation for Education, Culture, and Science. In 1984, He was appointed as Ambassador, Permanent Delegate of the Sultanate of Oman to UNESCO, in Paris, France.

Hassan worked as a permanent delegate of Oman from 1984 to 2009, during which time he served as President of the General Conference. He was awarded a UNESCO gold medal and three UNESCO silver medals.

In 2009, Hassan was promoted by Royal Decree to the position of Adviser with Special Grade as the Permanent Delegate of Oman to UNESCO from 2009 to 2016. From 2016 until his retirement at the end of 2018, he continued his diplomatic work as Adviser with Special Grade at the Embassy of the Sultanate of Oman in Paris.

== Awards and accolades ==
In 2007 Hassan was awarded the title of 'Ambassador for peace' by the International Federation for World Peace and the International Federation of Religions for Peace. He also held the Order of Cultural Merit in the Arts and Literature of the rank of commander of the French Republic, and the Presidential Medal of Honor from the Republic of Bulgaria, both awarded in 2008.

In January 2016, he was awarded the Oman Civil Order, Third Class, by Sultan Qaboos Bin Said.

== Other works ==
Hassan worked with the Arab League's Educational, Cultural and Scientific Organization (ALECSO) as a member of Oman's delegation to the general conferences of ALECSO, and as member of the organization's executive board (1976–1981). He also founded Oman-based business development consultancy Al-Ghafa in 1983, where he later took on an executive board position, as his son Salem Moosa Jaffar Hassan became managing director.

He was also professor lecturer on North Africa and the Middle East at the American Graduate School of International Relations and Diplomacy (Paris) and published a number of scholarly and literary works: "The Development of Omani Administrative Law", "Audat Shanjoub" (The Return of Shanjoub), "Wain Zamanak Ya Bahr" (The Lost Glory of Seafaring Days), "Min al Hayat" (From the Life), "Kalam al Nas Youji al Ras" (Gossip Source of Headache), "Al Darawish Sketches". Hassan had also been an actor and theatre director, and wrote several plays on social and cultural subjects.

== Efforts for rights ==
Hassan was elected president of the 33rd session of the General Conference, UNESCO's supreme governing body, in October 2005 with the unanimous support of the Arab-Group and other electoral groups, the executive board, and served until the end of his mandate in November 2007.
