= International Atomic Energy Agency =

International organisation

Coordinates: 48°14′2″N 16°24′58″E

- Abbreviation: IAEA
- Formation: 29 July 1957; 69 years ago
- Type: International organization
- Legal status: Active
- Headquarters: Vienna, Austria
- Members: 182 member states
- Head: Director General; Rafael Grossi
- Staff: 2556 (professional and general service staff) (2022)
- Website: iaea.org

IAEA's worldwide sites:

In Europe:

- Vienna – Headquarters
- Geneva – Liaison Office
- Monaco – Laboratory/Research Centre
- Seibersdorf – Laboratory/Research Centre
- Trieste – Laboratory/Research Centre

In North America:

- New York City – Liaison Office
- Toronto – Regional Safeguard Office

In Asia:

- Tokyo – Regional Safeguard Office

The International Atomic Energy Agency (IAEA) is an intergovernmental organization that seeks to promote the peaceful use of nuclear energy and to inhibit its use for any military purpose, including nuclear weapons. It was established in 1957 as an autonomous organization within the United Nations System; though governed by its own founding treaty, the organization reports to both the General Assembly and the Security Council of the United Nations, and is headquartered at the UN Office at Vienna, Austria.

The IAEA was created in response to growing international concern toward nuclear weapons, especially amid rising tensions between the foremost nuclear powers, the United States and the Soviet Union. U.S. president Dwight D. Eisenhower's "Atoms for Peace" speech, which called for the creation of an international organization to monitor the global proliferation of nuclear resources and technology, is credited with catalyzing the formation of the IAEA, whose treaty came into force on 29 July 1957 upon U.S. ratification.

The IAEA serves as an intergovernmental forum for scientific and technical cooperation on the peaceful use of nuclear technology and nuclear power worldwide. It maintains several programs that encourage the development of peaceful applications of nuclear energy, science, and technology; provide international safeguards against misuse of nuclear technology and nuclear materials; and promote and implement nuclear safety (including radiation protection) and nuclear security standards. The organization also conducts research in nuclear science and provides technical support and training in nuclear technology to countries worldwide, particularly in the developing world.

Following the ratification of the Treaty on the Non-Proliferation of Nuclear Weapons in 1968, all non-nuclear powers are required to negotiate a safeguards agreement with the IAEA, which is given the authority to monitor nuclear programs and to inspect nuclear facilities. In 2005, the IAEA and its administrative head, Director General Mohamed ElBaradei, were awarded the Nobel Peace Prize "for their efforts to prevent nuclear energy from being used for military purposes and to ensure that nuclear energy for peaceful purposes is used in the safest possible way".

== Missions ==
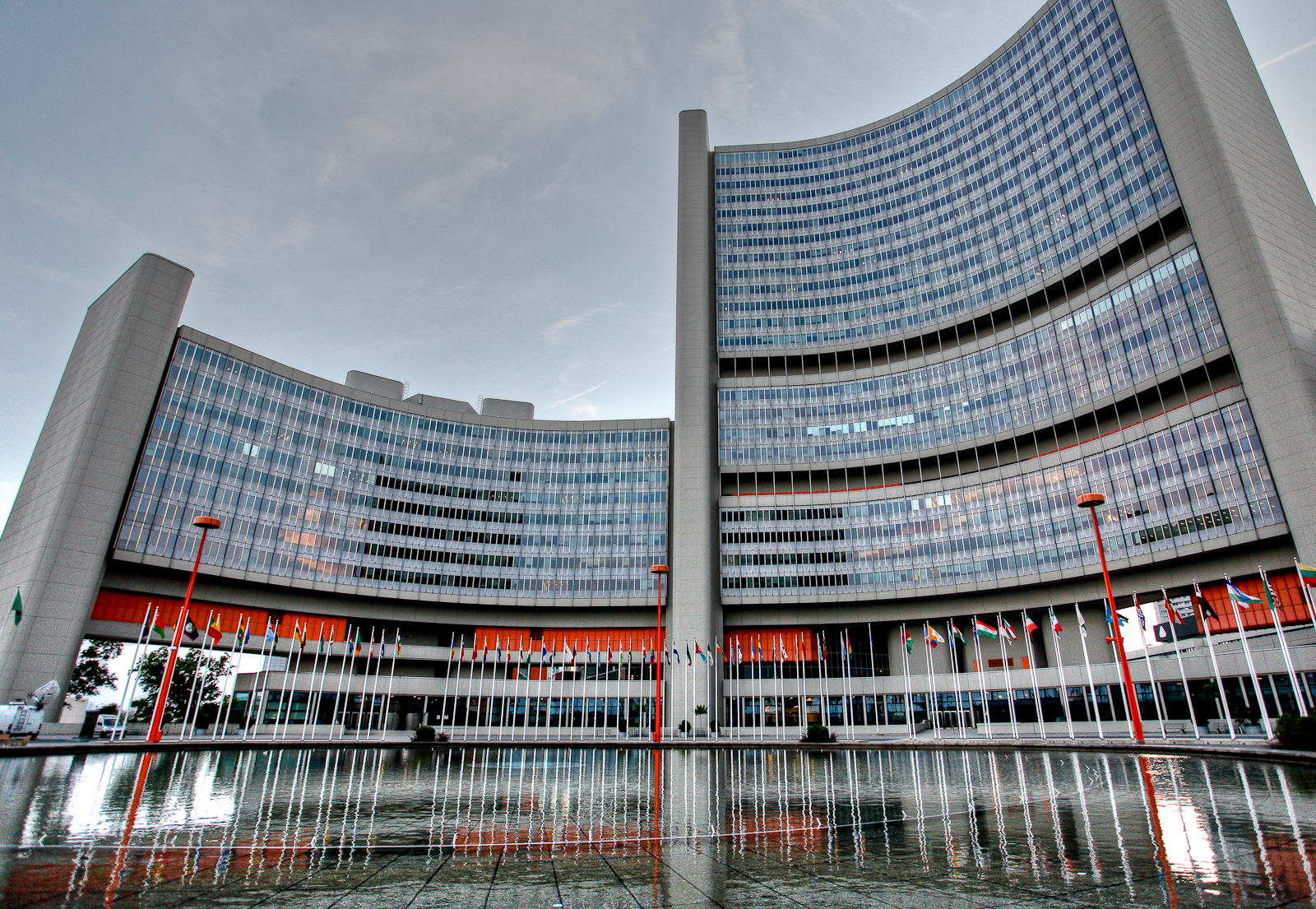
Vienna International Center, location of IAEA Headquarters

The IAEA is generally described as having three main missions:

- Peaceful uses: Promoting the peaceful uses of nuclear energy by its member states,
- Safeguards: Implementing safeguards to verify that nuclear energy is not used for military purposes, and
- Nuclear safety: Promoting high standards for nuclear safety.

=== Peaceful uses ===
According to Article II of the IAEA Statute, the objectives of the IAEA are "to accelerate and enlarge the contribution of atomic energy to peace, health and prosperity throughout the world" and to "ensure ... that assistance provided by it or at its request or under its supervision or control is not used in such a way as to further any military purpose." Its primary functions in this area, according to Article III, are to encourage research and development, to secure or provide materials, services, equipment, and facilities for Member States, and to foster the exchange of scientific and technical information and training.

Three of the IAEA's six departments are principally charged with promoting the peaceful uses of nuclear energy. The Department of Nuclear Energy focuses on providing advice and services to Member States on nuclear power and the nuclear fuel cycle. The Department of Nuclear Sciences and Applications focuses on the use of non-power nuclear and isotope techniques to help IAEA Member States in the areas of water, energy, health, biodiversity, and agriculture. The Department of Technical Cooperation provides direct assistance to IAEA Member States, through national, regional, and inter-regional projects through training, expert missions, scientific exchanges, and provision of equipment.

=== Safeguards ===
Article II of the IAEA Statute defines the Agency's twin objectives as promoting peaceful uses of atomic energy and "ensur[ing], so far as it is able, that assistance provided by it or at its request or under its supervision or control is not used in such a way as to further any military purpose." To do this, the IAEA is authorized in Article III.A.5 of the Statute "to establish and administer safeguards designed to ensure that special fissionable and other materials, services, equipment, facilities, and information made available by the Agency or at its request or under its supervision or control are not used in such a way as to further any military purpose; and to apply safeguards, at the request of the parties, to any bilateral or multilateral arrangement, or at the request of a State, to any of that State's activities in the field of atomic energy."

The Department of Safeguards is responsible for carrying out this mission, through technical measures designed to verify the correctness and completeness of states' nuclear declarations.

=== Nuclear safety ===
The IAEA classifies safety as one of its top three priorities. It spends 8.9 percent of its 352 million-euro ($469 million) regular budget in 2011 on making plants secure from accidents. Its resources are used on the other two priorities: technical co-operation and preventing nuclear weapons proliferation.

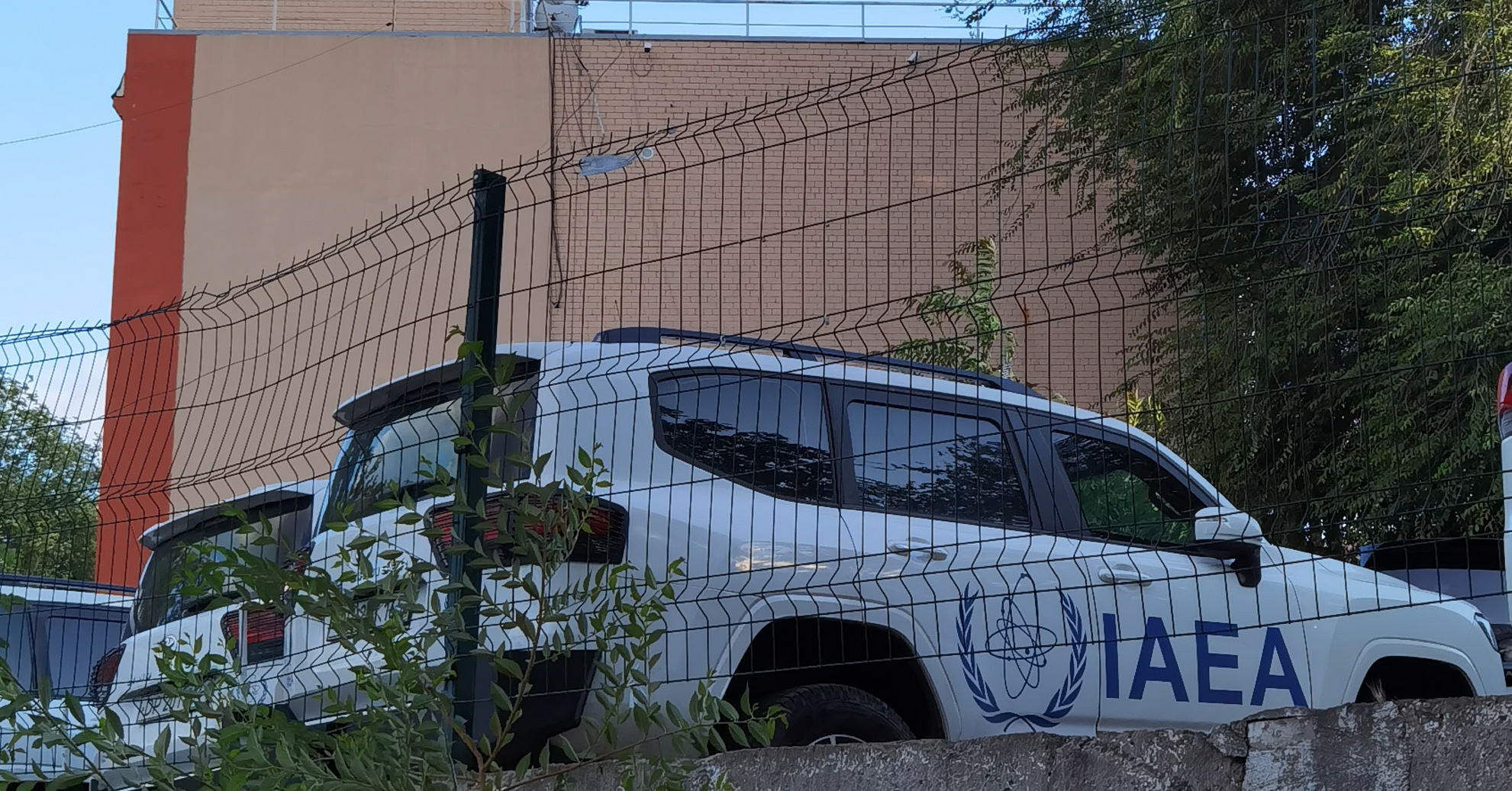
IAEA car in Dnipro, Ukraine

The IAEA itself says that, beginning in 1986, in response to the nuclear reactor explosion and disaster near Chernobyl, Ukraine, the IAEA redoubled its efforts in the field of nuclear safety. The IAEA says that the same happened after the Fukushima disaster in Fukushima, Japan.

In June 2011, IAEA Director General Yukiya Amano said he had "broad support for his plan to strengthen international safety checks on nuclear power plants to help avoid any repeat of Japan's Fukushima crisis" and proposed peer-reviewed safety checks on reactors worldwide, organized by the IAEA.

== History ==
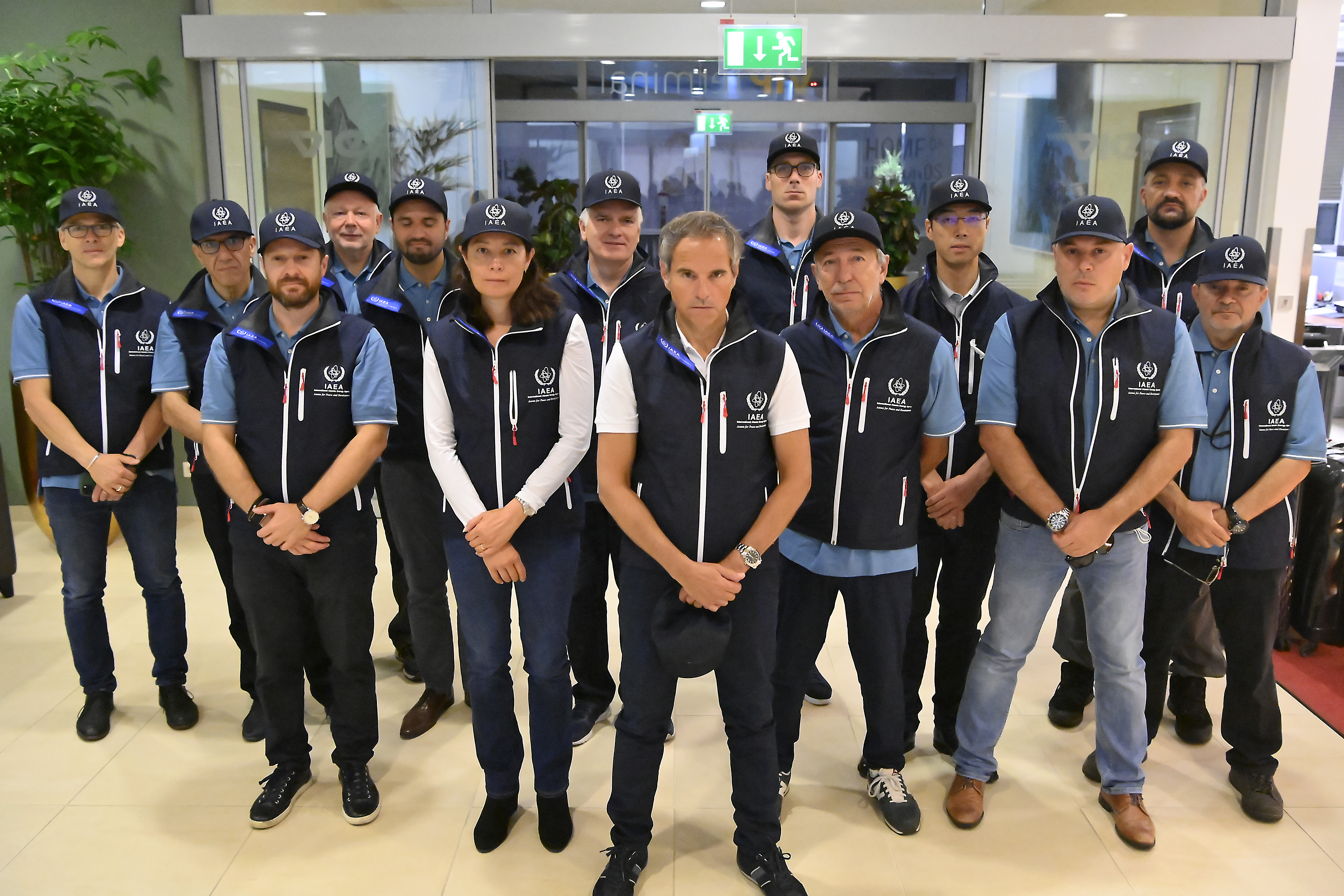
The inspection team, led by Director-General Rafael Grossi, Head of the Department of Nuclear Safety and Security Lydie Evrard and Head of the Department of Safeguards Massimo Aparo, that on 1 September 2022 started IAEA's first inspection of a nuclear plant in a war zone, at Zaporizhzhia Nuclear Power Plant in Ukraine

In 1946 United Nations Atomic Energy Commission was founded, but stopped working in 1949 and was disbanded in 1952. In 1953, U.S. President Dwight D. Eisenhower proposed the creation of an international body to both regulate and promote the peaceful use of atomic power (nuclear power), in his Atoms for Peace address to the UN General Assembly. In September 1954, the United States proposed to the General Assembly the creation of an international agency to take control of fissile material, which could be used either for nuclear power or for nuclear weapons. This agency would establish a kind of "nuclear bank".

The United States also called for an international scientific conference on all of the peaceful aspects of nuclear power. By November 1954, it had become clear that the Soviet Union would reject any international custody of fissile material if the United States did not agree to disarmament first, but that a clearinghouse for nuclear transactions might be possible. From 8 to 20 August 1955, the United Nations held the International Conference on the Peaceful Uses of Atomic Energy in Geneva, Switzerland. In October 1957, a Conference on the IAEA Statute was held at the Headquarters of the United Nations to approve the founding document for the IAEA, which was negotiated in 1955–1957 by a group of twelve countries. The Statute of the IAEA was approved on 23 October 1956 and came into force on 29 July 1957.

Former US Congressman W. Sterling Cole served as the IAEA's first Director-General from 1957 to 1961. Cole served only one term, after which the IAEA was headed by two Swedes for nearly four decades: the scientist Sigvard Eklund held the job from 1961 to 1981, followed by former Swedish Foreign Minister Hans Blix, who served from 1981 to 1997. Blix was succeeded as Director General by Mohamed ElBaradei of Egypt, who served until November 2009.

Beginning in 1986, in response to the nuclear reactor explosion and disaster near Chernobyl, Ukraine, the IAEA increased its efforts in the field of nuclear safety. The same happened after the 2011 Fukushima disaster in Fukushima, Japan.

Both the IAEA and its then Director General, ElBaradei, were awarded the Nobel Peace Prize in 2005. In his acceptance speech in Oslo, ElBaradei stated that only one percent of the money spent on developing new weapons would be enough to feed the entire world, and that, if we hope to escape self-destruction, then nuclear weapons should have no place in our collective conscience, and no role in our security.

On 2 July 2009, Yukiya Amano of Japan was elected as the Director General for the IAEA, defeating Abdul Samad Minty of South Africa and Luis E. Echávarri of Spain. On 3 July 2009, the Board of Governors voted to appoint Yukiya Amano "by acclamation", and IAEA General Conference in September 2009 approved. He took office on 1 December 2009. After Amano's death, his Chief of Coordination Cornel Feruta of Romania was named Acting Director General.

On 2 August 2019, Rafael Grossi was presented as the Argentine candidate to become the Director General of IAEA. On 28 October 2019, the IAEA Board of Governors held its first vote to elect the new Director General, but none of the candidates secured the two-thirds majority (23 votes) in the 35-member IAEA Board of Governors that was needed to be elected. The next day, 29 October, the second voting round was held, and Grossi won 24 votes. He assumed office on 3 December 2019. Following a special meeting of the IAEA General Conference to approve his appointment, on 3 December Grossi became the first Latin American to head the Agency.

During the Russian invasion of Ukraine, Grossi visited Ukraine multiple times as part of the ongoing efforts to help prevent a nuclear accident during the war. He warned against any complacency towards the dangers that the Zaporizhzhia Nuclear Power Plant, Europe's largest nuclear power plant, was facing. The plant has come under fire multiple times during the war.

== Function and structure ==
=== General ===
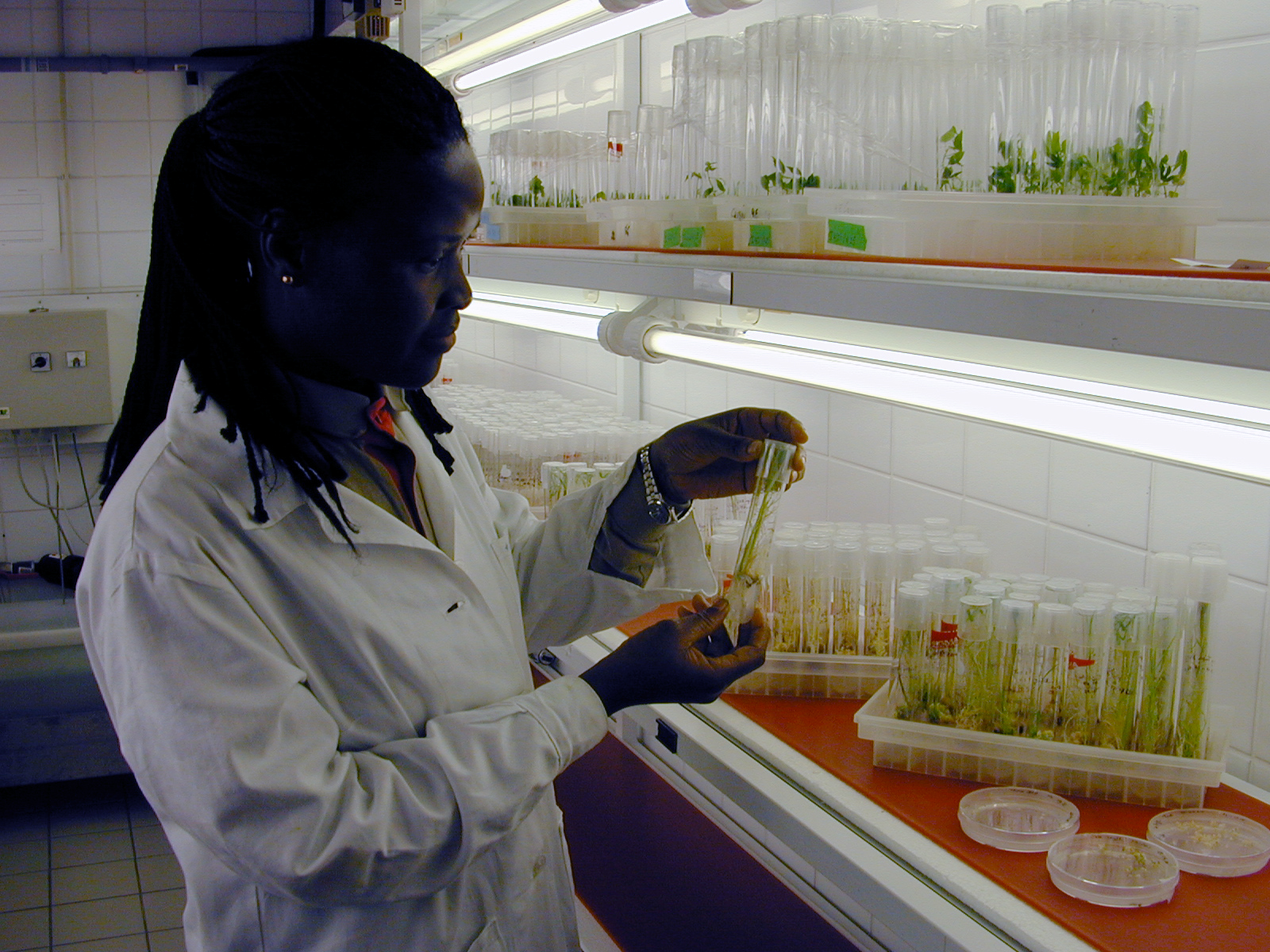
A laboratory technician at the IAEA's Plant Breeding Unit in Seibersdorf checking on a phial containing a young banana plant

The IAEA's mission is guided by the interests and needs of Member States, strategic plans, and the vision embodied in the IAEA Statute (see below). Three main pillars – or areas of work – underpin the IAEA's mission: Safety and Security; Science and Technology; and Safeguards and Verification.

The IAEA as an autonomous organization is not under the direct control of the UN, but the IAEA does report to both the UN General Assembly and Security Council. Unlike most other specialized international agencies, the IAEA does much of its work with the Security Council, and not with the United Nations Economic and Social Council. The structure and functions of the IAEA are defined by its founding document, the IAEA Statute (see below). The IAEA has three main bodies: the Board of Governors, the General Conference, and the Secretariat.

The IAEA exists to pursue the "safe, secure and peaceful uses of nuclear sciences and technology" (Pillars 2005). The IAEA executes this mission with three main functions: the inspection of existing nuclear facilities to ensure their peaceful use, providing information and developing standards to ensure the safety and security of nuclear facilities, and as a hub for the various fields of science involved in the peaceful applications of nuclear technology.

The IAEA recognizes knowledge as the nuclear energy industry's most valuable asset and resource, without which the industry cannot operate safely and economically. Following the IAEA General Conference since 2002 resolutions the Nuclear Knowledge Management, a formal program was established to address Member States' priorities in the 21st century.

In 2004, the IAEA developed a Programme of Action for Cancer Therapy (PACT). PACT responds to the needs of developing countries to establish, to improve, or to expand radiotherapy treatment programs. The IAEA is raising money to help efforts by its Member States to save lives and reduce the suffering of cancer victims.

The IAEA has established programs to help developing countries in planning to build systematically the capability to manage a nuclear power program, including the Integrated Nuclear Infrastructure Group, which has carried out Integrated Nuclear Infrastructure Review missions in Indonesia, Jordan, Thailand and Vietnam. The IAEA reports that roughly 60 countries are considering how to include nuclear power in their energy plans.

To enhance the sharing of information and experience among IAEA Member States concerning the seismic safety of nuclear facilities, in 2008 the IAEA established the International Seismic Safety Centre. This centre is establishing safety standards and providing for their application in relation to site selection, site evaluation and seismic design.

The IAEA has its headquarters since its founding in Vienna, Austria. The IAEA has two "Regional Safeguards Offices" which are located in Toronto, Canada, and in Tokyo, Japan. The IAEA also has two liaison offices which are located in New York City, United States, and in Geneva, Switzerland. In addition, the IAEA has laboratories and research centers located in Seibersdorf, Austria, in Monaco and in Trieste, Italy.

=== Board of Governors ===
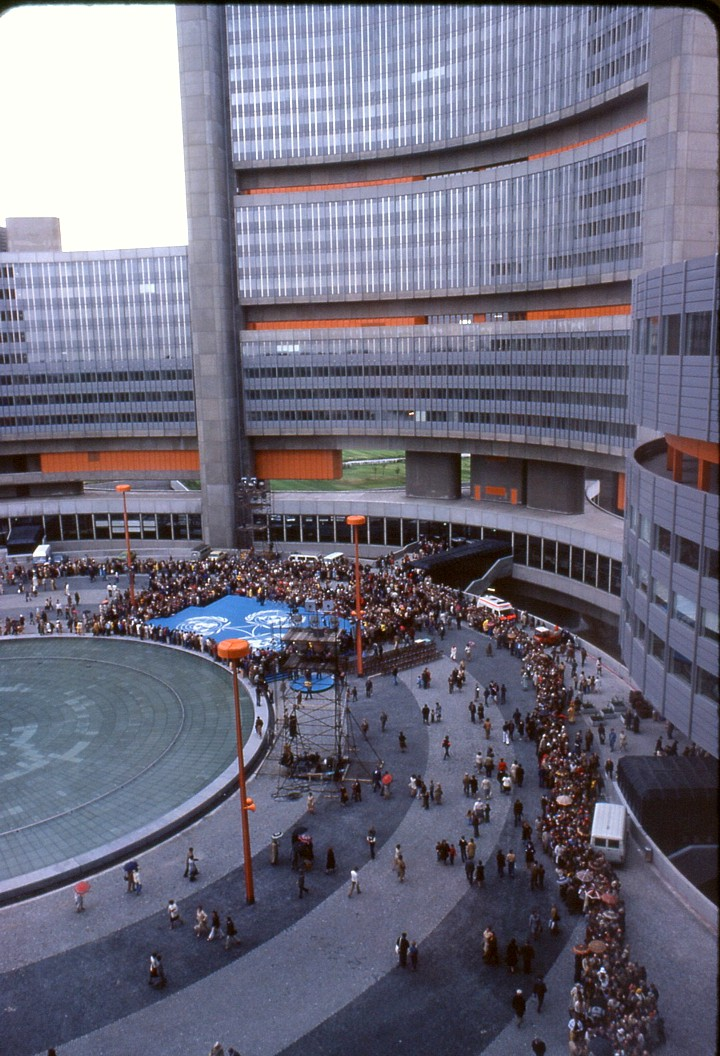
"UNO City" another name for the Vienna office complex in which is located IAEA Headquarters

The Board of Governors is one of two policy-making bodies of the IAEA. The Board consists of 22 member states elected by the General Conference, and at least 10 member states nominated by the outgoing Board. The outgoing Board designates the ten members who are the most advanced in atomic energy technology, plus the most advanced members from any of the following areas that are not represented by the first ten: North America, Latin America, Western Europe, Eastern Europe, Africa, Middle East, and South Asia, South East Asia, the Pacific, and the Far East. These members are designated for one year terms. The General Conference elects 22 members from the remaining nations to two-year terms. Eleven are elected each year. The 22 elected members must also represent a stipulated geographic diversity.

The Board generally meets five times per year: in March and June, twice in September (before and after the General Conference) and in November. In its meetings, it is responsible for making most of the policies of the IAEA. The Board makes recommendations to the General Conference on IAEA activities and budget, is responsible for publishing IAEA standards and appoints the Director-General subject to General Conference approval. Board members each receive one vote. Budget matters require a two-thirds majority. All other matters require only a simple majority. The simple majority also has the power to stipulate issues that will thereafter require a two-thirds majority. Two-thirds of all Board members must be present to call a vote. The Board elects its own chairman.

List of chairs
Name	Nationality	Term
HE Mr Ian Biggs	Australia	2025 – 2026
HE Ms Matilda Aku Alomatu Osei-Agyeman	Ghana	2025 – 2025
HE Ambassador Philbert Abaka Johnson	Ghana	2024 – 2025
HE Mr Holger Federico Martinsen	Argentina	2023 – 2024
HE Mr Ivo Sramek	Czech Republic	2022 – 2023

List of vice-chairs
Name	Nationality	Term
HE Ms Emilia Kraleva	Bulgaria	2023 – 2024
HE Mr Peter Potman	Netherlands	2023 – 2024
HE Mr Eoin O'Leary	(Republic of Ireland) Ireland	2022 – 2023
HE Mr Carlos Sérgio Sobral Duarte	Brazil	2022 – 2023

=== General Conference ===
The General Conference is made up of all 182 member states. It meets once a year, typically in September, to approve the actions and budgets passed on from the Board of Governors. The General Conference also approves the nominee for Director General and requests reports from the Board on issues in question (Statute). Each member receives one vote. Issues of budget, Statute amendment and suspension of a member's privileges require a two-thirds majority and all other issues require a simple majority. Similar to the Board, the General Conference can, by simple majority, designate issues to require a two-thirds majority. The General Conference elects a President at each annual meeting to facilitate an effective meeting. The President only serves for the duration of the session (Statute).

The main function of the General Conference is to serve as a forum for debate on current issues and policies. Any of the other IAEA organs, the Director-General, the Board and member states can table issues to be discussed by the General Conference (IAEA Primer). This function of the General Conference is almost identical to the General Assembly of the United Nations.

=== Secretariat ===
The Secretariat is the professional and general service staff of the IAEA. The Secretariat is headed by the Director General. The Director General is responsible for enforcement of the actions passed by the Board of Governors and the General Conference. The Director General is selected by the Board and approved by the General Conference for renewable four-year terms. The Director General oversees six departments that do the actual work in carrying out the policies of the IAEA: Nuclear Energy, Nuclear Safety and Security, Nuclear Sciences and Applications, Safeguards, Technical Cooperation, and Management.

The IAEA budget is in two parts. The regular budget funds most activities of the IAEA and is assessed to each member nation (€344 million in 2014). The Technical Cooperation Fund is funded by voluntary contributions with a general target in the US$90 million range.

==== Directors General ====
Name	Nationality	Duration	Duration (years)
W. Sterling Cole	(United States) American	1 December 1957 – 30 November 1961	4
Sigvard Eklund	(Sweden) Swedish	1 December 1961 – 30 November 1981	20
Hans Blix	(Sweden) Swedish	1 December 1981 – 30 November 1997	16
Mohamed ElBaradei	(Egypt) Egyptian	1 December 1997 – 30 November 2009	12
Yukiya Amano	(Japan) Japanese	1 December 2009 – 18 July 2019	9
Cornel Feruță (Acting)	(Romania) Romanian	25 July 2019 – 2 December 2019	0.33
Rafael Grossi	(Argentina) Argentine	3 December 2019 – present	6

== Membership ==
Member states Observer states Membership withdrawn Non-members

The process of joining the IAEA is fairly simple. Normally, a State would notify the Director General of its desire to join, and the Director would submit the application to the Board for consideration. If the Board recommends approval, and the General Conference approves the application for membership, the State must then submit its instrument of acceptance of the IAEA Statute to the United States, which functions as the depositary Government for the IAEA Statute. The State is considered a member when its acceptance letter is deposited. The United States then informs the IAEA, which notifies other IAEA Member States. Signature and ratification of the Nuclear Non-Proliferation Treaty (NPT) are not preconditions for membership in the IAEA.

The IAEA has 182 member states. Most UN members and the Holy See are Member States of the IAEA.

Four states have withdrawn from the IAEA. North Korea was a Member State from 1974 to 1994, but withdrew after the Board of Governors found it in non-compliance with its safeguards agreement and suspended most technical co-operation. Nicaragua became a member in 1957, withdrew its membership in 1970, and rejoined in 1977, Honduras joined in 1957, withdrew in 1967, and rejoined in 2003, while Cambodia joined in 1958, withdrew in 2003, and rejoined in 2009.

=== Regional Cooperative Agreements ===
There are four regional cooperative areas within IAEA, that share information, and organize conferences within their regions:

==== AFRA ====
The African Regional Cooperative Agreement for Research, Development and Training Related to Nuclear Science and Technology (AFRA):

- Algeria
- Chad
- Kenya
- Morocco
- South Africa
- Angola
- Ivory Coast
- Lesotho
- Mozambique
- Sudan
- Benin
- Democratic Republic of the Congo
- Libya
- Namibia
- Tanzania
- Botswana
- Egypt
- Madagascar
- Niger
- Tunisia
- Burkina Faso
- Eritrea
- Malawi
- Nigeria
- Uganda
- Burundi
- Ethiopia
- Mali
- Senegal
- Zambia
- Cameroon
- Gabon
- Mauritania
- Seychelles
- Zimbabwe
- Central African Republic
- Ghana
- Mauritius
- Sierra Leone

==== ARASIA ====
Cooperative Agreement for Arab States in Asia for Research, Development and Training related to Nuclear Science and Technology (ARASIA):

- Iraq
- Jordan
- Lebanon
- Saudi Arabia
- Oman
- Qatar
- Syria
- United Arab Emirates
- Yemen

==== RCA ====
Regional Cooperative Agreement for Research, Development and Training Related to Nuclear Science and Technology for Asia and the Pacific (RCA):

- Australia
- Bangladesh
- Cambodia
- China
- Fiji
- India
- Indonesia
- Japan
- South Korea
- Laos
- Malaysia
- Mongolia
- Myanmar
- Nepal
- New Zealand
- Pakistan
- Palau
- Philippines
- Singapore
- Sri Lanka
- Thailand
- Vietnam

==== ARCAL ====
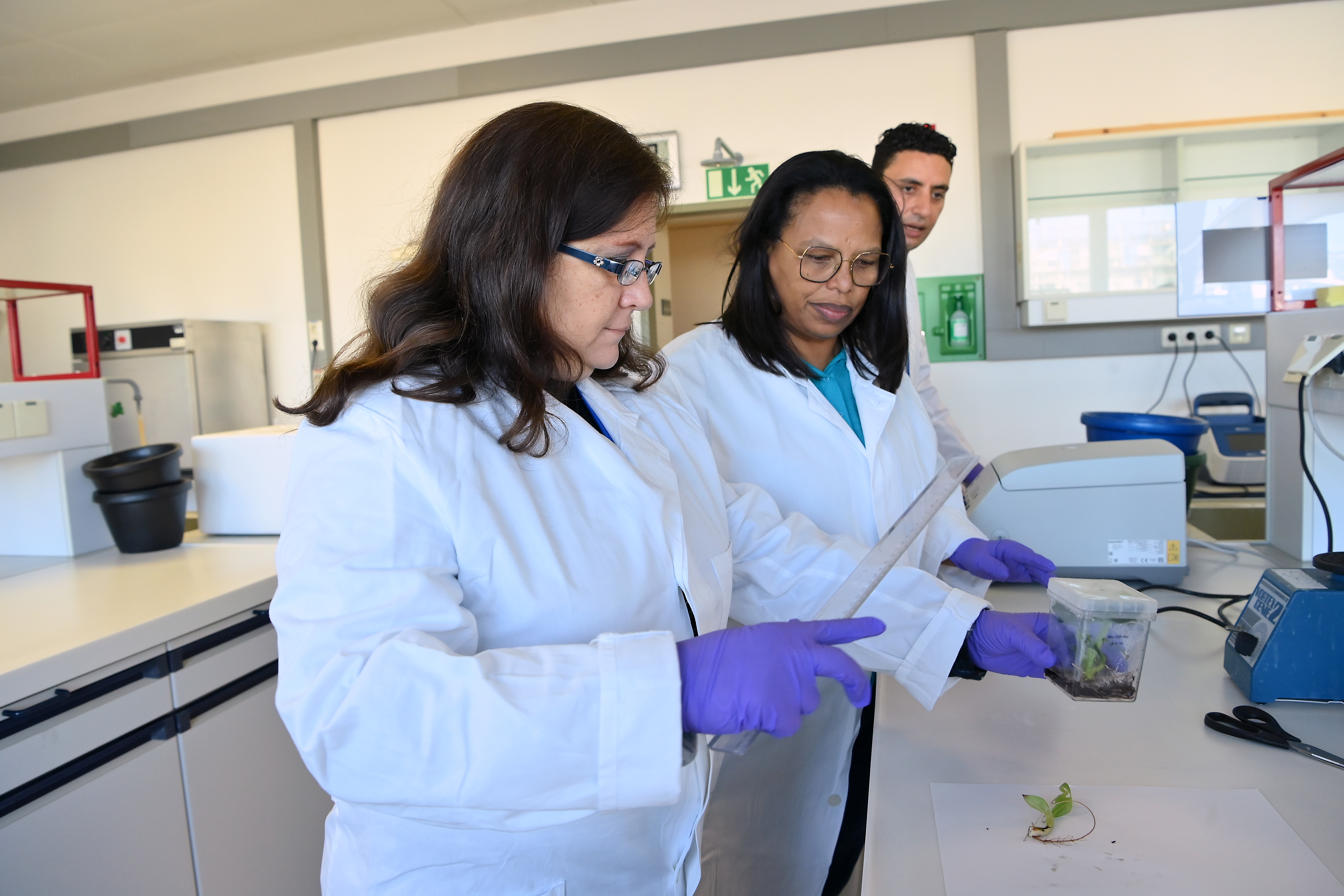
Latin American IAEA Fellows at the Regional Training Course on Mutation Breeding and Efficiency Enhancing Techniques for Resistance to Banana Fusarium Wilt TR4, 2022

Cooperation Agreement for the Promotion of Nuclear Science and Technology in Latin America and the Caribbean (ARCAL):

- Argentina
- Bolivia
- Brazil
- Chile
- Colombia
- Costa Rica
- Cuba
- Ecuador
- El Salvador
- Guatemala
- Haiti
- Honduras
- Jamaica
- Mexico
- Nicaragua
- Panama
- Paraguay
- Peru
- Dominican Republic
- Uruguay
- Venezuela

== Criticism ==
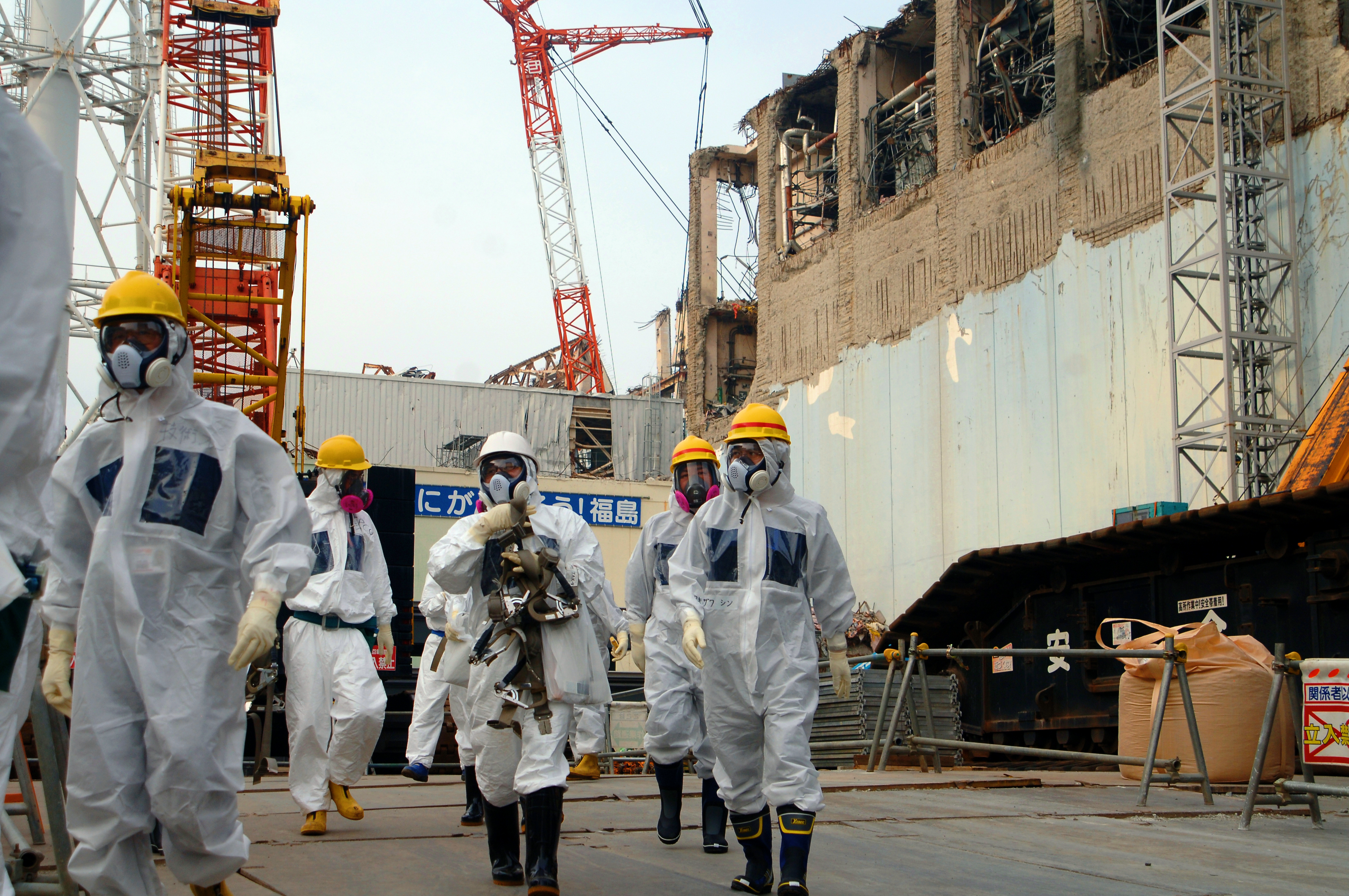
IAEA experts at Fukushima Daiichi Nuclear Power Plant Unit 4

In 2011, Russian nuclear accident specialist Yuliy Andreev was critical of the response to Fukushima, and says that the IAEA did not learn from the 1986 Chernobyl disaster. He has accused the IAEA and corporations of "wilfully ignoring lessons from the world's worst nuclear accident 25 years ago to protect the industry's expansion". The IAEA's role "as an advocate for nuclear power has made it a target for protests".

The journal Nature has reported that the IAEA response to the 2011 Fukushima Daiichi nuclear disaster in Japan was "sluggish and sometimes confusing", drawing calls for the agency to "take a more proactive role in nuclear safety". But nuclear experts say that the agency's complicated mandate and the constraints imposed by its member states mean that reforms will not happen quickly or easily, although its INES "emergency scale is very likely to be revisited" given the confusing way in which it was used in Japan.

Some scientists say that the Fukushima nuclear accidents have revealed that the nuclear industry lacks sufficient oversight, leading to renewed calls to redefine the mandate of the IAEA so that it can better police nuclear power plants worldwide. There are several problems with the IAEA says Najmedin Meshkati of University of Southern California:

It recommends safety standards, but member states are not required to comply; it promotes nuclear energy, but it also monitors nuclear use; it is the sole global organisation overseeing the nuclear energy industry, yet it is also weighed down by checking compliance with the Nuclear Non-Proliferation Treaty (NPT).

In 2011, the journal Nature reported that the International Atomic Energy Agency should be strengthened to make independent assessments of nuclear safety and that "the public would be better served by an IAEA more able to deliver frank and independent assessments of nuclear crises as they unfold".

== Publications ==
Typically issued in July each year, the IAEA Annual Report summarizes and highlights developments over the past year in major areas of the Agency's work. It includes a summary of major issues, activities, and achievements, and status tables and graphs related to safeguards, safety, and science and technology. Alongside the Annual Report, the IAEA also issues Topical Reviews which detail specific sectors of its work, comprising the Nuclear Safety Review, Nuclear Security Review, Safeguards Implementation Report, Nuclear Technology Review, and Technical Cooperation Report.

== See also ==
- European Organization for Nuclear Research
- Global Initiative to Combat Nuclear Terrorism
- IAEA Areas
- Institute of Nuclear Materials Management
- International Energy Agency
- International Renewable Energy Agency
- International Radiation Protection Association
- International reactions to the Fukushima Daiichi nuclear disaster
- Lists of nuclear disasters and radioactive incidents
- List of states with nuclear weapons
- Nuclear ambiguity
- Nuclear Energy Agency
- OPANAL
- Proliferation Security Initiative
- United Nations Atomic Energy Commission (UNAEC)
- World Association of Nuclear Operators
- World Nuclear Association

Awards and achievements
Preceded by Wangari Muta Maathai	Nobel Peace Prize Laureate with Mohamed ElBaradei; 2005	Succeeded by Grameen Bank and Muhammad Yunus
