= Hans Blix =

Swedish politician (born 1928)

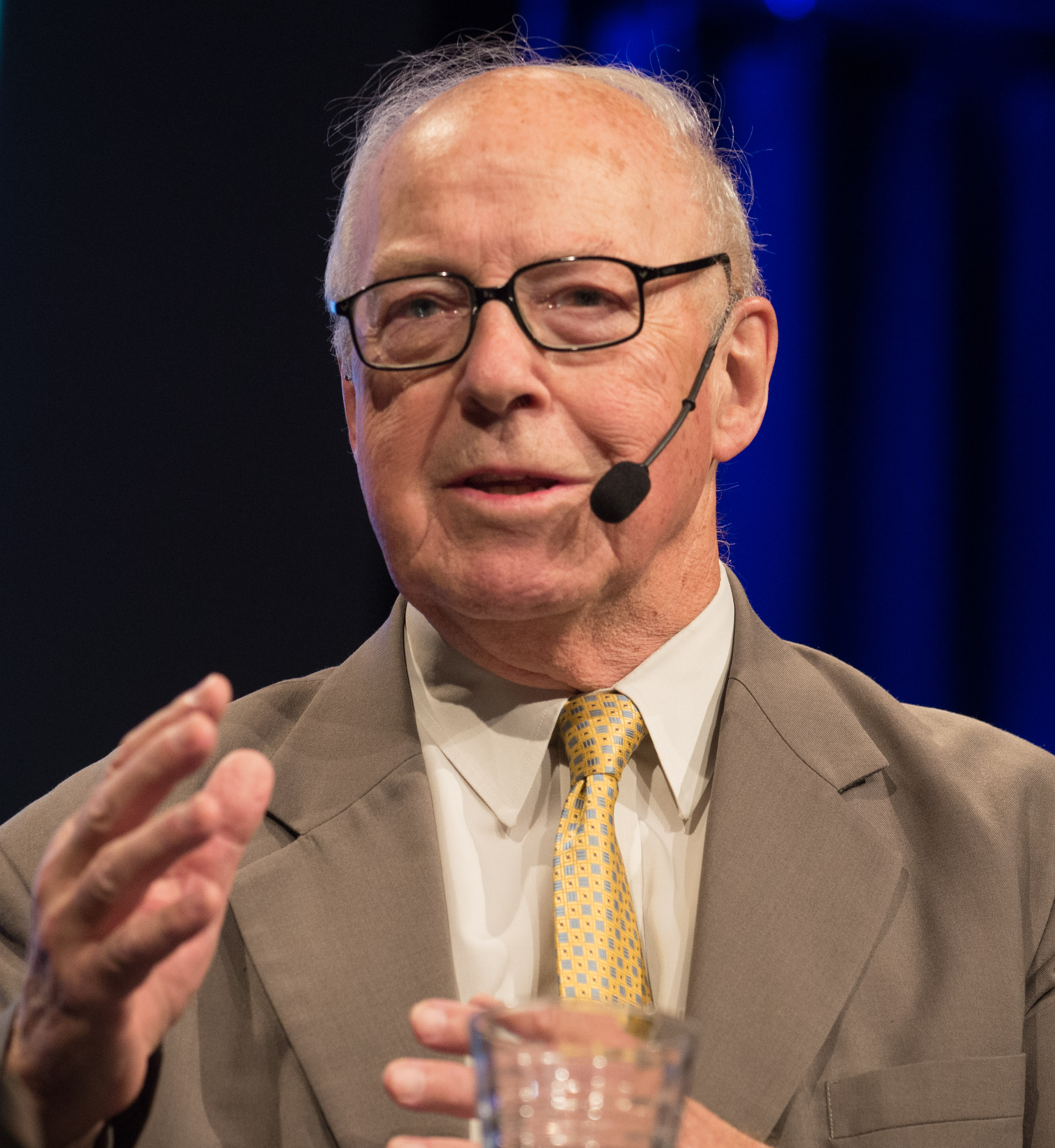
- Blix during a debate about NATO in Stockholm, 2015

1st Executive Chairman of the United Nations Monitoring, Verification and Inspection Commission
- In office 1 March 2000 – 30 June 2003
- Preceded by: None
- Succeeded by: Dimitris Perrikos

3rd Director General of the International Atomic Energy Agency
- In office 1981 – 1 December 1997
- Preceded by: Sigvard Eklund
- Succeeded by: Mohamed ElBaradei

Minister for Foreign Affairs
- In office 18 October 1978 – 12 October 1979
- Monarch: Carl XVI Gustaf
- Prime Minister: Ola Ullsten
- Preceded by: Karin Söder
- Succeeded by: Ola Ullsten

President, World Federation of United Nations Associations
- In office 2006 – 11 August 2009
- Preceded by: Rhyl Jansen
- Succeeded by: Park Soo-gil

Personal details
- Born: Hans Martin Blix; 28 June 1928 (age 98) Uppsala, Sweden
- Party: Liberal People's Party
- Spouse: Eva Kettis (m. 1962)
- Parent(s): Gunnar Blix; Hertha Wiberg

Hans Martin Blix (Swedish: [hɑːns ˈblɪks]; born 28 June 1928) is a Swedish diplomat and politician for the Liberal People's Party. He was Swedish Minister for Foreign Affairs (1978–1979) and later became the head of the International Atomic Energy Agency. Blix was the first Western representative to inspect the consequences of the Chernobyl disaster in the Soviet Union on-site and led the agency's response to them. Blix was also the head of the United Nations Monitoring, Verification and Inspection Commission from March 2000 to June 2003, when he was succeeded by Dimitris Perrikos. In 2002, the commission began searching Iraq for weapons of mass destruction, ultimately finding none. On 17 March 2003, U.S. President George W. Bush delivered an address from the White House announcing that within 48 hours, the United States would invade Iraq unless Saddam Hussein would leave. Bush then ordered all of the weapons inspectors, including Blix's team, to leave Iraq so that America and its allies could invade Iraq on 20 March. In February 2010, Blix became head of the United Arab Emirates' advisory board for its nuclear power program. He is the former president of the World Federation of United Nations Associations.

== Life and career ==
Blix was born in Uppsala, Sweden. He is the son of professor Gunnar Blix and Hertha Wiberg, and grandson of professor Magnus Blix. He comes from a family of Jamtlandic origin. Blix studied at Uppsala University and Columbia University, earning his PhD from the University of Cambridge (Trinity Hall). In 1959, he earned a Juris Doctor in international law at Stockholm University, where he was appointed associate professor in international law the next year. Hans Blix has two sons, Mårten and Göran, who both hold doctoral degrees.

Between 1962 and 1978 Blix was a member of the Swedish delegation at the Disarmament Conference in Geneva. He held several other positions in the Swedish administration between 1963 and 1976, and from 1961 to 1981, he served on the Swedish delegation to the United Nations. From 1978 to 1979, Blix was the Swedish Foreign Minister.

Blix chaired the Swedish Liberal Party's campaign during the 1980 referendum on nuclear power, campaigning in favour of the retention of the Swedish nuclear energy program.

== Head of the International Atomic Energy Agency (1981–1997) ==
Blix became Director General of the International Atomic Energy Agency between 1981 and 1997 after Sigvard Eklund.

Blix personally made repeated inspection visits to the Iraqi nuclear reactor Osiraq before its attempted destruction by the Iranians, in 1980, and its eventual destruction by the Israeli Air Force in 1981 during Operation Opera. Although most agreed that Iraq was years away from being able to build a nuclear weapon, the Iranians and the Israelis felt any raid must occur well before nuclear fuel was loaded to prevent nuclear fallout. The attack was regarded as being in breach of the United Nations Charter (S/RES/487) and was widely condemned. Iraq was alternately praised and admonished by the IAEA for its cooperation and lack thereof. It was only after the first Gulf War that the full extent of Iraq's nuclear programs, which had switched from a plutonium-based weapon design to a highly enriched uranium design after the destruction of Osiraq, became known.

Another significant event during his time as head of the IAEA was the Chernobyl disaster on 26 April 1986, a nuclear accident rated at the highest level 7 on the IAEA's International Nuclear Event Scale. He was "accused of minimising the dangers following the catastrophe– released a statement that settlements around Chernobyl would “be safe for residents” before long."

== Iraq disarmament crisis (2002–2003) ==
During the Iraq disarmament crisis before the 2003 invasion of Iraq, Blix was called back from retirement by UN Secretary-General Kofi Annan to lead the United Nations Monitoring, Verification and Inspection Commission in charge of monitoring Iraq. Kofi Annan originally recommended Rolf Ekéus, who worked with UNSCOM in the past, but Russia and France vetoed his appointment.

Blix personally admonished Saddam for "cat and mouse" games and warned Iraq of "serious consequences" if it attempted to hinder or delay his mission.

In his report to the UN Security Council on 14 February 2003, Blix claimed that "so far, UNMOVIC has not found any such weapons [of mass destruction], only a small number of empty chemical munitions."

In 2004, Blix stated that "there were about 700 inspections, and in no case did we find weapons of mass destruction."

Blix's statements about the Iraq WMD program contradicted the claims of the George W. Bush administration and attracted a great deal of criticism from supporters of the invasion of Iraq. In an interview on BBC 1 on 8 February 2004, Blix accused the US and British governments of dramatizing the threat of weapons of mass destruction in Iraq to strengthen the case for the 2003 war against the government of Saddam Hussein. Ultimately, Blix was largely vindicated; the invasion failed to turn up any active WMD programs.

In an interview with The Guardian newspaper, Blix said, "I have my detractors in Washington. There are bastards who spread things around, of course, who planted nasty things in the media."

In 2004, Blix published a book, Disarming Iraq, where he gives his account of the events and inspections before the coalition began its invasion.

=== CIA investigation ===
Senior American officials ordered the Central Intelligence Agency (CIA) to investigate Blix to gather "sufficient ammunition to undermine" him so that the US could start the invasion of Iraq. The American officials were upset that the CIA did not uncover such information.

Blix said he suspected his home and office were bugged by the United States while he led teams searching for Saddam Hussein's supposed weapons of mass destruction. Although these suspicions were never directly substantiated, evidence of a request for bugging of UN Security Council representatives around the time the US was seeking approval from the council came to light after a British government translator leaked a document "allegedly from an American National Security Agency" requesting that British intelligence put wiretaps on delegates to the UN Security Council.

== Weapons of Mass Destruction Commission ==
Since 2003, Blix has been chairman of the Weapons of Mass Destruction Commission (WMDC), an independent body funded by the Swedish government and based in Stockholm.

In December 2006, the Weapons of Mass Destruction Commission said in a report that Pakistan's nuclear scientist Abdul Qadeer Khan could not have acted alone when passing on nuclear data and designs "without the awareness of the Pakistan government."

== President of WFUNA ==
In 2006, Hans Blix was elected president of the World Federation of United Nations Associations at its 38th Plenary Assembly.

== Humanitarian initiatives ==
In 2009, Blix joined the project Soldiers of Peace, an anti-war film.

== Head of Advisory Board for United Arab Emirates Nuclear Program ==
Blix chairs a panel of advisors who oversee the establishment of the UAE's Dh150 billion atomic energy programme. He leads the nine-person board, which meets twice a year. The International Advisory Board (IAB) oversees the progress of the nation's nuclear energy plan and issues reports on potential improvements to the scheme.

== Awards and honours ==
=== Awards ===
- (Sweden) H. M. The King's Medal, 12th size gold (silver-gilt) medal worn around the neck on the Order of the Seraphim ribbon (1998)
- (Sweden) Illis quorum (2018)
- Grand Decoration of Honour in Gold with Sash for Services to the Republic of Austria (1997)
- (France) Commander of the Legion of Honour (2004)
- (Sweden) Seraphim Medal (2004)
- Recipient of the Henry DeWolf Smyth Nuclear Statesman Award (1988)
- Gold Medal for distinguished service in the field of nuclear affairs by the Uranium Institute (now World Nuclear Association) (1997)
- Otto Hahn Prize of the City of Frankfurt/Main (1998)
- Awarded the Golden Doves for Peace Journalistic prize issued by the Italian Research Institute Archivio Disarmo (2004)
- Sydney Peace Prize (2007)
- Awarded the Fulbright Prize (2014)

=== Honours ===
- Doctorate Honoris causa of the University of Moscow in 1987.
- Honorary membership in the Cambridge Union Society.
- Doctorate Honoris causa of the Vrije Universiteit Brussel in 2003.
- Doctorate Honoris causa of the University of Padova in 2004.
- Doctorate Honoris causa of the University of Cambridge in 2007.
- Elected as Honorary President of the World Federation of United Nations Associations in 2009. Elected as President of the World Federation of United Nations Associations in Buenos Aires in 2006 and served until 2009.

== In media ==
- Blix appeared in the documentaries The World According to Bush, and Europe & USA: Behind the Scenes of a Political Rupture.
- A marionette version of Blix appears in Team America: World Police. In the film, Blix demands to inspect Kim Jong-il's palace; Kim's response is to feed Blix to a shark.
- Blix is the unnamed main character in the Swedish novel The Diplomat (Diplomaten 2009) by Alexander Ahndoril published by Albert Bonnier publishing house.
- Blix is a protagonist of a documentary film Blix Not Bombs (2023) by Greta Stocklassa
- Blix's conversation with Gabriel Elkeiy on a global "public mind" and selecting the next United Nations Secretary-General (2026).

== Bibliography ==
- Disarming Iraq: The Search for Weapons of Mass Destruction. Hans Blix, Pantheon (9 March 2004). ISBN 0-375-42302-8.
- Why Nuclear Disarmament Matters. Hans Blix, The MIT Press (30 April 2008). ISBN 0-262-02644-9.
- A Farewell to Wars:The Growing Restraints on the Interstate Use of Force. Hans Blix, Cambridge University Press (23 November 2023). ISBN 9781009392532.
- The Hans Blix Iraq War Diaries: 2000-2003. Hans Blix, Cambridge University Press (26 July 2025). ISBN 9781009650151.

== See also ==
- International Conference on Nuclear Disarmament
- Iraq and weapons of mass destruction
- Iraq disarmament crisis
- Hans Corell
- Operation Rockingham
- Dag Hammarskjöld
- Mohamed ElBaradei
- V. R. Raghavan, Commissioner on the Independent Commission on Weapons of Mass Destruction

Government offices
Preceded by Karin Söder	Swedish Minister for Foreign Affairs; 1978–1979	Succeeded by Ola Ullsten
Preceded by Sigvard Eklund	Director General of the IAEA; 1981–1997	Succeeded by Mohamed ElBaradei
Preceded by None	Executive Chairman of the UNMOVIC; 2000–2003	Succeeded by Demetrius Perricos
