= Dimitris Perrikos =

Greek chemist (born 1935)

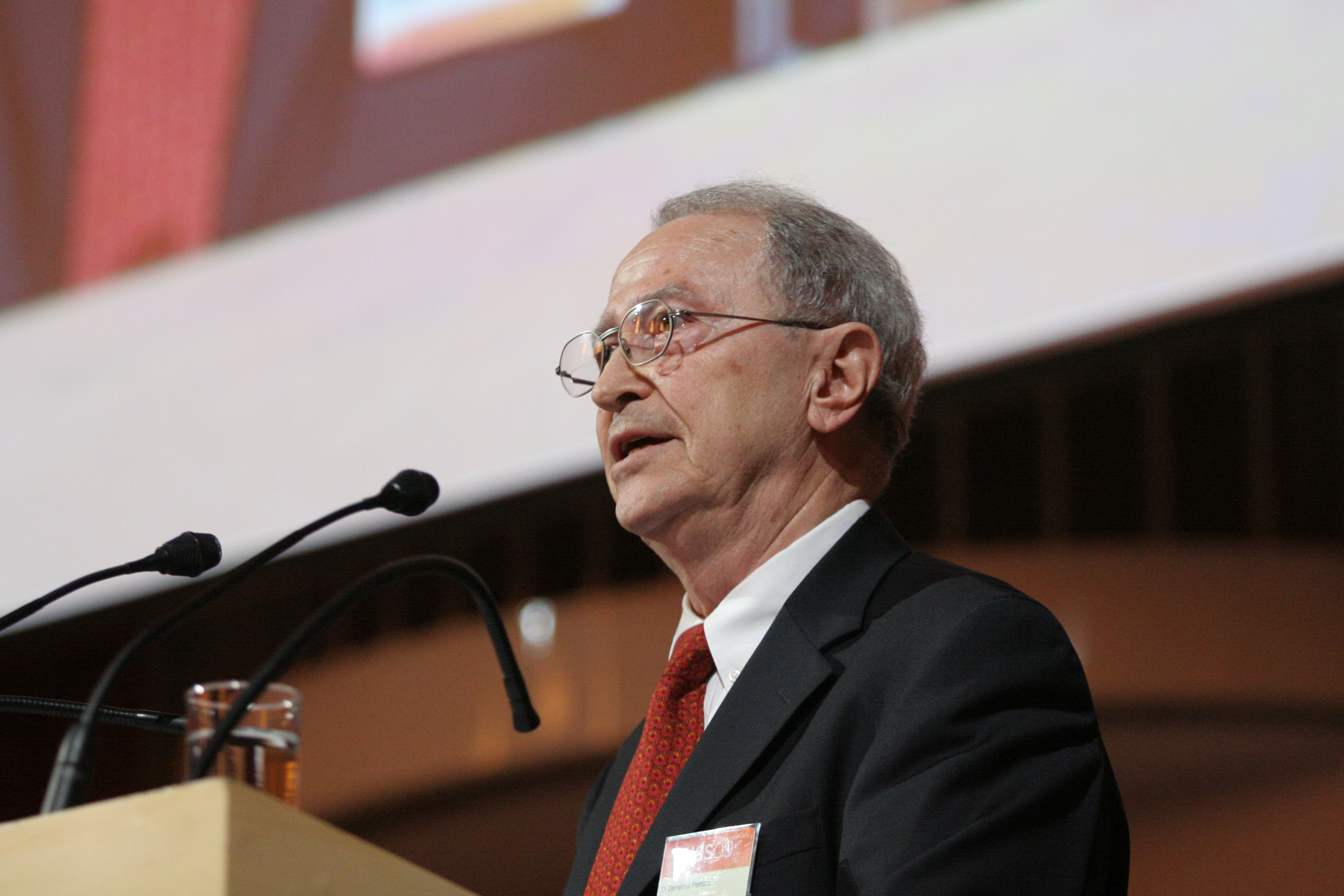
- Dimitris Perrikos

2nd Executive Chairman of the United Nations Monitoring, Verification and Inspection Commission
- In office June 2003 – 2007
- Preceded by: Hans Blix

Personal details
- Born: December 1935; Piraeus, Greece

Dimitris Perrikos (Greek: Δημήτρης Περρίκος, born December 1935 in Piraeus, Greece) is a Greek chemist working for the United Nations since 1975. He was the second Chairman of the United Nations Monitoring, Verification and Inspection Commission (UNMOVIC), succeeding Dr. Hans Blix in June 2003, and serving until UNMOVIC's dissolution in 2007. He is the son of the Greek Air Force officer and Resistance fighter Kostas Perrikos, founder of PEAN.

Preceded by Hans Blix	Executive Chairman of the UNMOVIC; 2003 – 2007	Succeeded by -
