= Magnus Blix =

Swedish physiologist

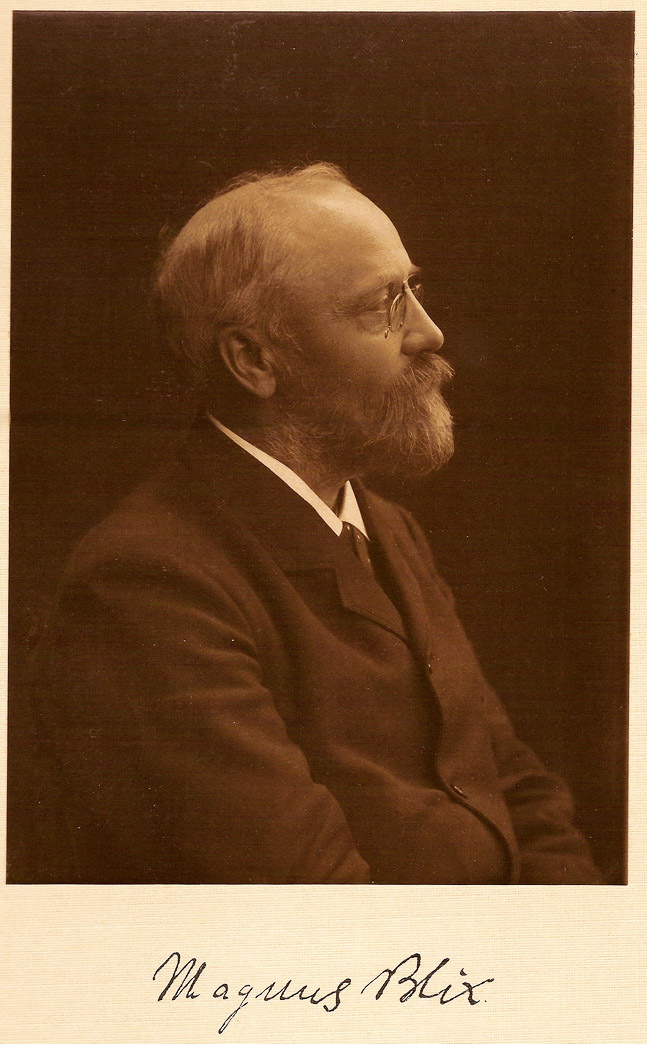
Magnus Gustaf Blix (1849–1904) with signature.

Magnus Gustaf Blix (25 December 1849 – 14 February 1904) was a Swedish physiologist born in the parish Säbrå, presently located in Härnösand Municipality. He is the father of biochemist and early glycobiologist Gunnar Blix and the grandfather of UN weapons inspector Hans Blix. During his career he was a professor at the Universities of Uppsala and Lund. Blix was elected a member of the Royal Swedish Academy of Sciences in 1892.

Blix is best known for his work in the 1880s involving somatic sensation. He discovered that electrical stimulation on different points on the surface of the skin caused distinct warm or cool sensations. Subsequently he built a "temperature stimulator" which showed that a decreased skin temperature produced cool sensations from localized spots at separate skin locations. He also discovered that increased temperature induced warm sensations from different cutaneous locations. In addition he performed tests that involved localized tactile sensitivity.

In 1881–82 Blix published his findings in two important documents. During this time frame, German neurologist Alfred Goldscheider (1858–1935), and American physician Henry Herbert Donaldson (1857–1938) of Johns Hopkins University were performing similar experiments, independent of Blix.

Blix is also credited for conducting extensive research on the physiology of muscles.

He died in Lund.

== See also ==
Hematocrit
