= Gunnar Blix =

Swedish chemist

Fritiof Gunnar Blix (7 September 1894 in Lund – 10 June 1981 in Uppsala) was a Swedish chemist and Professor of Medical and Physiological chemistry at the University of Uppsala. He was the son of physiologist Magnus Blix, and the father of Swedish politician and diplomat Hans Blix.

== Early life and education ==
Blix graduated from the Cathedral School in central Lund in 1912. He began his medical studies at Lund University in 1912 and became a medical student in 1916, received a license to practice medicine in 1922, and earned his PhD in 1925. He started working in the laboratory of Physical Chemistry at Uppsala University in 1925 and served as a Professor of Medical and Physiological Chemistry there from 1930 to 1961.

== Scientific Career ==
Blix was a member of several boards of inquiry (similar to a Royal Commission) including the 1958 investigation at the Medical College in Umeå. Blix was also a member of the Royal Society of Sciences in Uppsala. In 1950 he became an honorary member of the Austrian Society for Analytical Chemistry (ASAC). Blix also served as Prorector at the University of Uppsala from 1956-1961. His research focused on physiological chemistry and nutrition research. Much of his early work involved fats chemistry. His thesis concerned the blood lipids in diabetics. In 1933 he discovered that sulfatide in the brain contained amide-bound fatty acid and 4-sphingenine. Along with Arne Tiselius and Harold Svensson he discovered lipoproteins in 1941, a fundamental discovery for research on atherosclerosis. He also conducted extensive studies of hyaluronan (hyaluronic acid). He discovered sialic acids in 1936 and subsequently named them in 1952.

Blix was elected in 1956 as Member of the Royal Swedish Academy of Sciences.

He is buried in Uppsala Old Cemetery.
