= Sigvard Eklund =

Swedish politician (1911–2000)

Sigvard Arne Eklund
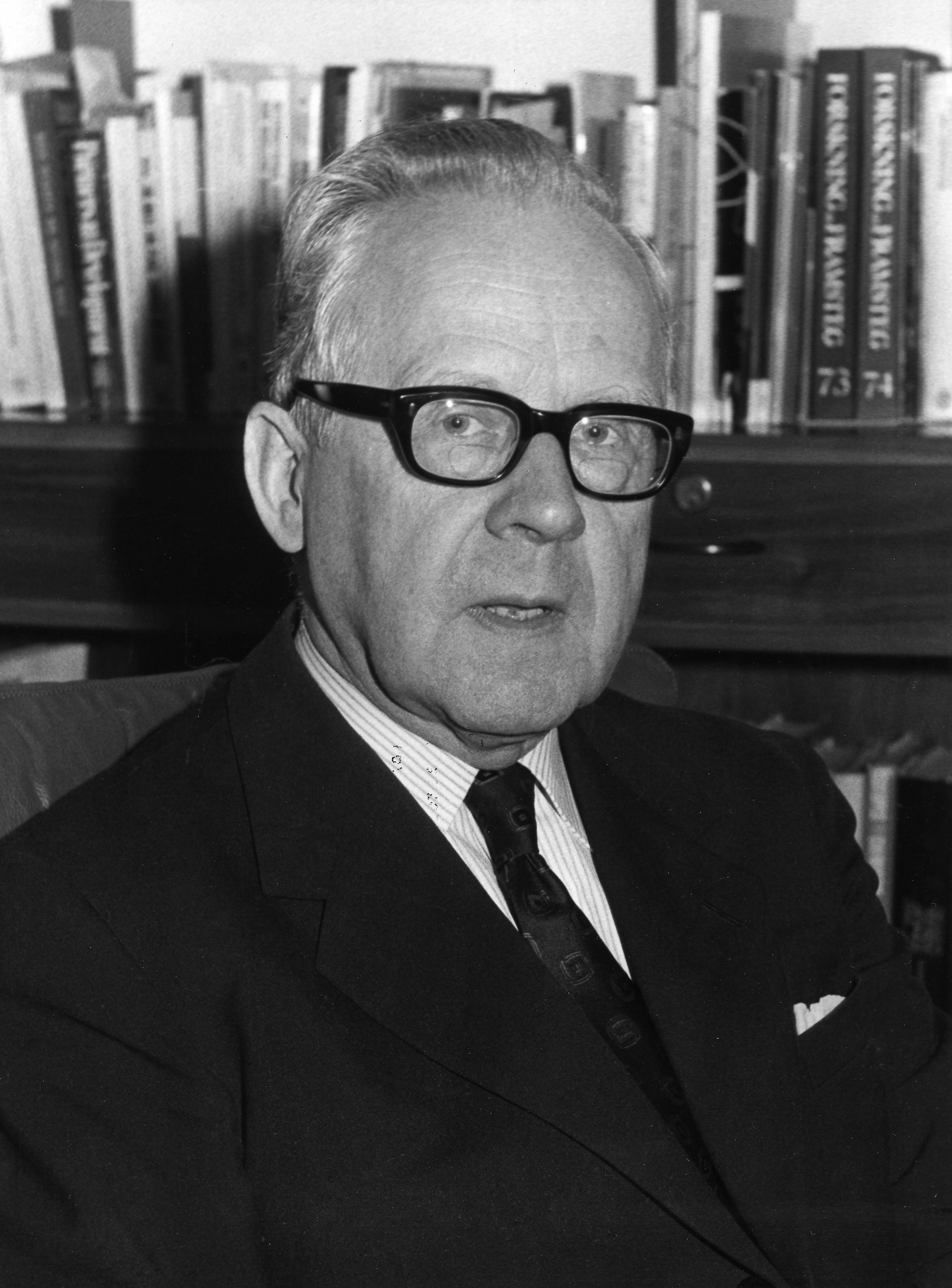

2nd Director General of the International Atomic Energy Agency
- In office 1 December 1961 – 30 November 1981
- Preceded by: W. Sterling Cole
- Succeeded by: Hans Blix

Personal details
- Born: 19 June 1911 Kiruna, Sweden
- Died: 30 January 2000 (aged 88) Vienna, Austria

Sigvard Arne Eklund (19 June 1911 – 30 January 2000) was Director General of the International Atomic Energy Agency from 1961 to 1981.

== Early life ==
Eklund was born on 19 June 1911 in Kiruna, Norrbotten County, Sweden, the son of Severin Eklund, a train driver, and his wife Vilhelmina (née Pettersson). Eklund obtained his Master of Science degree in 1936, a Licentiate of Philosophy (fil.lic.) degree in 1941 and a Doctor of Philosophy (fil.dr.) degree from Uppsala University in 1946.

== Career ==
Eklund worked as a docent in nuclear physics at the Royal Institute of Technology in Stockholm and as an employee of the Royal Swedish Academy of Sciences Institute of Physics (Vetenskapsakademiens forskningsinstitut för fysik) from 1937 to 1945. Eklund was an associate professor ("laborator") at the Swedish National Defence Research Institute (FOA) from 1945 to 1950 and became a member of the Swedish National Commission for Physics (Svenska nationalkommissionen för fysik) in 1947. Eklund became director of research at the Swedish Atomic Energy Company (AB Atomenergi, Stockholm) in 1950. He became technical director there in 1957 and led the effort to build Sweden's first research reactor, R1.

In 1957, he was Secretary General for the Second International United Nations Conference on the Peaceful Uses of Atomic Energy. He was appointed as Director General of the International Atomic Energy Agency in 1961. Eklund was reappointed four more times in 1965, 1969, 1974 and 1977, holding the post for twenty consecutive years until he retired and was named Director General Emeritus.

== Personal life ==
In 1941 he married adjunct lecturer Anna-Greta Johansson (born 1915), the daughter of merchant Algot Johansson and his wife Ester (née Sundkvist). After retiring, Eklund resided in Vienna, Austria until he died in 2000.

== Awards and honours ==
=== Awards ===
- (Sweden) H. M. The King's Medal, 12th size gold (silver-gilt) medal worn around the neck on the Order of the Seraphim ribbon (1980)
- (Sweden) Commander 1st Class of the Order of the Polar Star (18 November 1971)
- Grand Decoration of Honour in Gold with Sash for Services to the Republic of Austria (1981)
- (United States) American Atoms for Peace Award (1968)
- (United States) Henry DeWolf Smyth Nuclear Statesman Award (NEI) (1976)

=== Honours ===
- Member of the Royal Swedish Academy of Engineering Sciences (1953)
- Member of the Royal Swedish Academy of Sciences (1972)
- Member of the National Academy of Engineering in United States (1979)
- Honorary Doctor of Philosophy at University of Graz (1968)
- Honorary doctor at Cracow University of Technology (1971)
- Honorary doctor at University of Bucharest (1971)
- Honorary doctor of technology at Chalmers University of Technology (1974)
- Honorary Doctor of Science at Columbia University (4 November 1977)
- Honorary doctor in Moscow (1977)
- Honorary doctor in Buenos Aires (1977)
- Honorary doctor of technology in Budapest (1977)
- Honorary senator at the University of Vienna (1977)
- Honorary doctor of technology in Dresden (1978)
- Honorary doctor at the Yonsei University (1978)
- Honorary doctor at the National Agrarian University (1979)
- Honorary doctor at the KTH Royal Institute of Technology (1980)

Non-profit organization positions
| Preceded by W. Sterling Cole | Director General of the International Atomic Energy Agency; 1961 – 1981 | Succeeded by Hans Blix |
