= General Conference (United Nations) =

UN meetings

In the United Nations system of specialized agencies such as UNESCO, General Conferences are the recurring meetings of Member States. General Conference sessions are usually held yearly or biennially (although other frequencies are possible) at the headquarters of the Agency. Special sessions of General Conferences may also be convened in other circumstances.

== Composition ==
A General Conference comprises an Agency's Member States, all having equal voting rights, although non-governmental organizations and intergovernmental organizations, regional or international, usually attend General Conference sessions as observers.

At General Conference sessions, each Member State is represented by one delegate (usually the Resident Representative to the Agency or, more rarely, a government minister) accompanied by alternates and advisers. In practice, however, General Conferences are not necessarily attended by all Member States; some might lack the financial means to send a delegation, while others purposely refrain from attending as a boycott measure.

== Functions ==
Functions of General Conferences are extensive. General Conferences determine their Agency's broad policy direction. General Conferences also elect the Agency's Director General and members of the Agency's standing executive board, while also approving States for membership or suspending a state therefrom.
